= Trump International Hotel and Tower (New York City) =

Residential skyscraper in Manhattan, New York

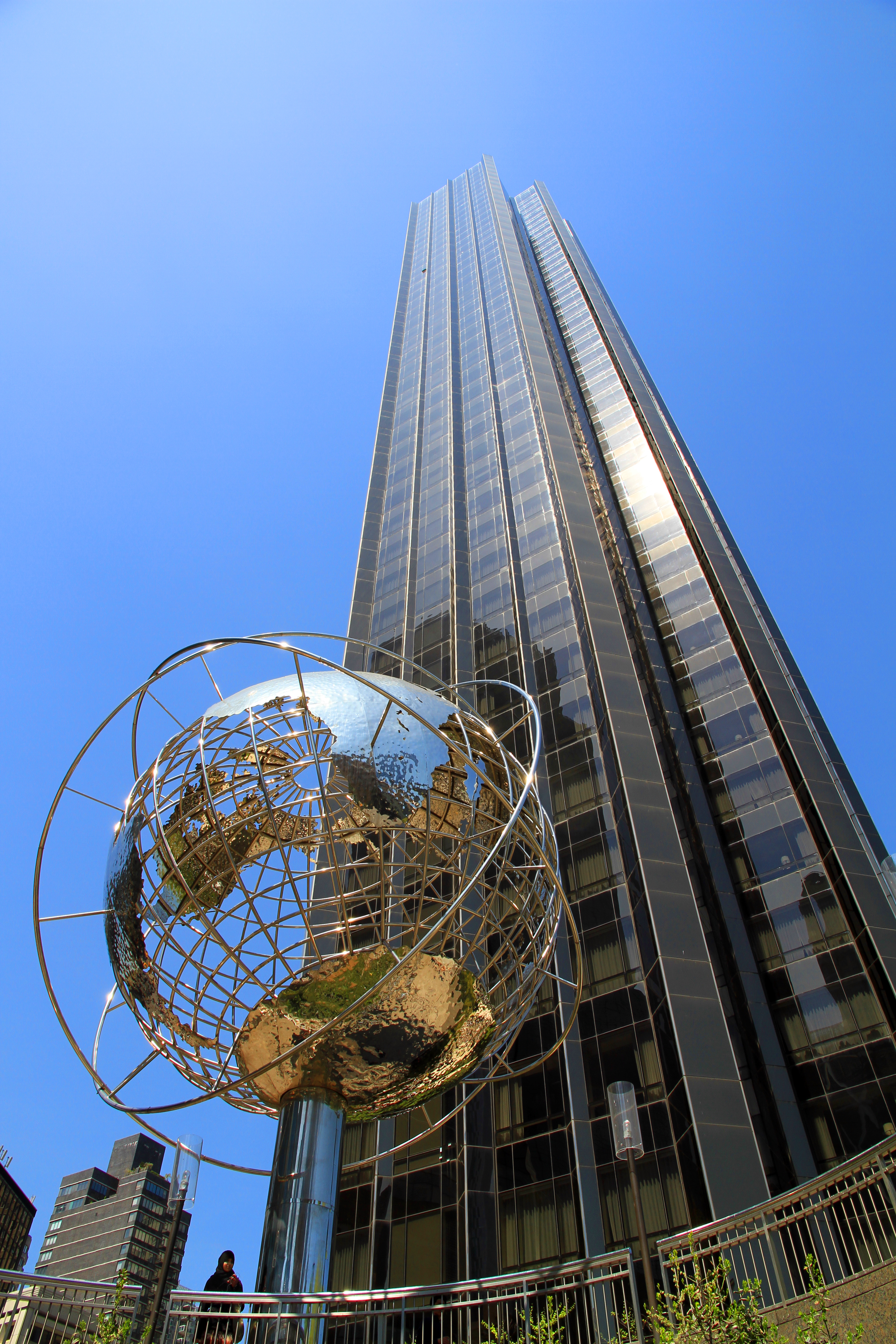
- The tower, with the Columbus Circle globe in front
- Former names: Gulf & Western Building

General information
- Status: Completed
- Type: Residential
- Location: 15 Columbus Circle; Manhattan, New York, U.S.
- Coordinates: 40°46′09″N 73°58′54″W
- Construction started: 1968
- Completed: 1970
- Renovated: 1995–1997

Height
- Roof: 583 ft (178 m)
- Top floor: 559 ft (170 m)

Technical details
- Floor count: 44

Design and construction
- Architect: Thomas E. Stanley

Renovating team
- Architects: Philip Johnson and Costas Kondylis

The Trump International Hotel and Tower, originally the Gulf and Western Building, is a high-rise building at 15 Columbus Circle and 1 Central Park West on the Upper West Side of Manhattan, New York City, United States. It was originally designed by Thomas E. Stanley as an office building and completed in 1970 as the headquarters of Gulf and Western Industries. In the mid-1990s, a joint venture composed of the General Electric Pension Fund, Galbreath Company, and developer Donald Trump renovated the building into a hotel and residential tower. The renovation was designed by Philip Johnson and Costas Kondylis.

The Trump International Hotel and Tower is 583 ft (178 m) tall and has contained 44 physical stories since it was built. The building originally had an aluminum-and-marble facade and was surrounded by a public plaza on Broadway and Central Park West. There was a movie theater and shops in the basement as well as a restaurant on the top floor. After the building was renovated, a glass facade was installed. The lower portion of the tower is used as a hotel, while the upper floors house residential condominiums.

Planning for an office skyscraper on the site dates to 1965, when developers Hyman R. and Irving J. Shapiro planned to replace an existing two- or three-story building there. After the Shapiros' firm made two failed proposals for the site, Realty Equities Corporation took over development in 1967. Upon its completion, the building served for more than two decades. By the early 1990s, the tower was bankrupt and the GE/Galbreath/Trump joint venture had taken over the structure. Gulf and Western successor Paramount Communications occupied the building until 1995, after which it was renovated; the residences opened in 1996 and the hotel rooms opened in 1997. The hotel was renovated in 2010.

== Site ==
The Trump International Hotel and Tower is at 1 Central Park West, along the northern side of Columbus Circle, on the Upper West Side of Manhattan in New York City, United States. It occupies a trapezoidal plot of land bounded by Broadway to the west, 61st Street to the north, and Central Park West to the east. The land lot covers 31,349 ft^{2} (2,912 m^{2}), with a frontage of 261.54 ft (79.72 m) on Central Park West and a depth of 195 ft (59 m). The building is abutted by 15 Central Park West to the north, Central Park to the east, and Deutsche Bank Center (formerly Time Warner Center) to the south. In addition, it is across Columbus Circle from 2 Columbus Circle and 240 Central Park South to the south. Entrances to the New York City Subway's 59th Street–Columbus Circle station, served by the 1, A, B, C, and D trains, are directly outside the building.

The block had contained Durland's Riding Academy in the early 20th century, as well as a ball field. The lot was purchased in 1911 by magazine magnate William Randolph Hearst. The plot was developed with the two-story American Circle Building, designed by Charles E. Birge, by 1914. The building, known as the American International Building, had a superstructure that could support the weight of a 30-story tower, though the additional stories were never built. Hearst had envisioned the creation of a large Midtown headquarters for his company near Columbus Circle, in the belief that the area would become the city's next large entertainment district. However, the proposal collapsed in the Great Depression and only the Hearst Magazine Building, three blocks south, was built. Hearst's low-rise building on the north side of Columbus Circle remained standing until the 1960s, with a prominent Coca-Cola sign displaying time and temperature.

== Architecture ==
The Trump International Hotel and Tower was originally the Gulf and Western Building, designed by Thomas E. Stanley and constructed in the late 1960s. It was built by HRH Construction. From 1995 to 1997, Philip Johnson and Costas Kondylis renovated the building into the current Trump International Hotel and Tower. Cantor Seinuk served as the structural engineers for the renovation. The 44-story building (Note: Sometimes cited as a 45-story building) is 583 ft (178 m) tall and is designed with 610,000 ft^{2} (57,000 m^{2}). This gives the building a floor area ratio (FAR) of 18. As apartment buildings were limited to a FAR of 12, Trump divided the tower into two separate structures for zoning purposes: a 17-story hotel at the base and a 28-story residential tower above.

The tower is managed by The Trump Organization, a company run by developer and later U.S. president Donald Trump. The hotel units are owned by the General Electric (GE) Pension Trust and Galbreath & Company, who partnered with Trump in the 1990s residential conversion. The Trump Organization owns one of the condominiums, the parking garage, the restaurant space, the room-service kitchens, and the bathrooms in the lobby. The building and hotel are managed by the Trump Organization. The building's board of directors is composed of six residential owners, two hotel owners, and the president of the Trump Organization (who as of 2022 is Donald Trump Jr.).

=== Plaza ===
The Gulf and Western Building was initially surrounded by a public plaza slightly above the sidewalk. The Central Park West frontage was raised two steps above the sidewalk there. Originally, the northwest corner of the plot had a seating area surrounding a staircase to a basement movie theater, the Paramount Theater. The only aboveground portion of the theater was a cylinder 30 ft (9.1 m) in diameter, which had an LED sign, a ticket booth, and an entrance to the theater. A stair and escalators led from ground level to the theater. The stairs were illuminated by theatrical lighting and were somewhat similar to the staircases designed by Wallace Harrison for the Metropolitan Opera House.

The portion of the plaza at the southern tip of the plot, facing Columbus Circle, is sunken below ground level. The circular plaza includes a large staircase leading to the New York City Subway's 59th Street–Columbus Circle station. There was also a building entrance in the sunken portion of the plaza. The sunken plaza had been added at the suggestion of by the Urban Design Group, which believed Broadway would be redeveloped significantly following the development of Lincoln Center several blocks north.

The Columbus Circle globe, a 30-foot-wide silver globe of the Earth by artist Kim Brandell, was installed in front of the building during its conversion into the Trump International Hotel and Tower. The globe is inspired by the Unisphere in Queens, the New York City borough where Trump had grown up. According to Trump, the globe had been installed at the suggestion of a feng shui consultant he had hired. The globe was to include the words "Trump International" in 3 ft-high (0.91 m) letters, but the letters were not installed because city officials objected to the idea. When the globe was installed in 1997, nearby office workers complained that it was causing too much glare. The original plan had been to coat the globe in a golden surface, which would have reduced the glare, but Trump's feng shui consultants had recommended against it.

=== Facade ===
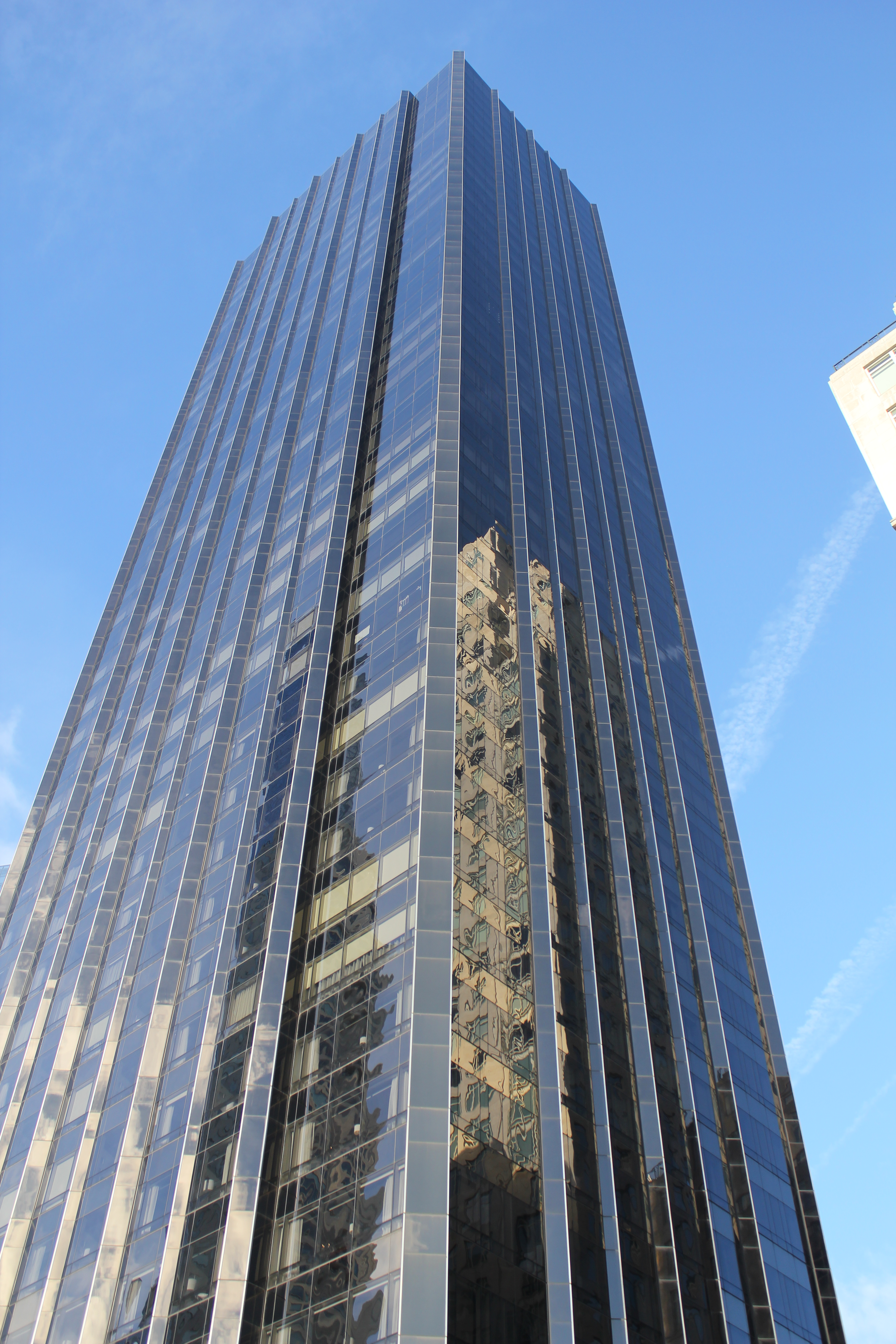
The facade seen from 61st Street

Thomas Stanley had intended the Gulf and Western Building to "provide a nice transition from Central Park", though the design was widely criticized upon the building's completion. The Gulf and Western Building's facade originally had steel columns, which were clad in marble from the plaza to the fourth story. Black granite was used in the spandrels above the second-story and third-story windows, while a marble belt course ran above the fourth floor. The marble was meant to complement the New York Coliseum (later demolished for the Deutsche Bank Center) and 2 Columbus Circle. On the fifth story and above, the facade was composed of prefabricated gray-glass windows with aluminum frames, as well as extruded vertical aluminum mullions that were painted white. A red sign reading "G&W" was originally mounted atop the building. The facade panels had become misaligned by the early 1990s, which necessitated the caulking of loose facade panels, as well as the installation of mullions and large pins to secure the panels.

When the building was renovated in the mid-1990s, the facade was re-clad in dark glass and steel. Trump had requested that glass be used, despite the fact that some of Johnson's more contemporary projects like 550 Madison Avenue used stone. Johnson had initially intended to model the new design on the Seagram Building, which he had helped design in the 1950s. As such, the windows between the columns were originally designed as flat windows, before Johnson considered designing the openings with projecting two-sided windows instead. The final design was similar to Johnson's One PPG Place in Pittsburgh. The redesigned facade has non-reflective, slightly projecting three-sided windows.

The facade's steel is painted a gold color, a hue Trump used in several of his other projects. Johnson attributed the gold color to Trump's preference. Trump had originally wanted the facade to be bright gold, but he decided to use a matte finish instead after hiring a feng shui consultant, who told him to change it to reflect the clouds in the sky. Johnson had suggested removing the glass spandrels between floors to reduce costs, but Trump declined, saying the spandrels "sparkle like a diamond".

=== Structural features ===
The Gulf and Western Building was erected with a mechanical core at its center. The outer stories were reinforced with steel columns at intervals of 26 ft (7.9 m). When the skyscraper was constructed, it would sway slightly during strong winds. According to structural engineer Ysrael Seinuk, the building would sway as much as 2.5 ft (0.76 m) laterally because of the lack of other tall buildings nearby to absorb the wind loads. Additionally, winds from the north would travel more quickly down Broadway than along Central Park West, due to the presence of a collection of tall apartment structures on Central Park West. This effectively turned the Gulf and Western Building into an airfoil, which would twist in high winds.

As early as 1982, structural cracks prompted the building's owner to install a wind brace from ground level to the roof, measuring 44 by 15 ft (13.4 by 4.6 m). When the building was renovated in the mid-1990s, Seinuk added two concrete-and-steel shear walls in a cruciform arrangement. Under the original renovation plans, diagonal steel trusses would have been installed in the mechanical core from the 1st to the 14th floors. The 15th and 16th stories, which were converted to mechanical stories, would have had double-height outrigger trusses connecting the core and perimeter, as well as a belt truss with inverted "V"s at the perimeter. On the upper stories, the number of columns in the periphery would have been doubled, reducing the space between columns to 13 ft (4.0 m). This plan had been abandoned by 1995 in favor of a concrete wall through the building's center, rising to the 33rd floors.

=== Interior ===
The building has a total area of 610,000 ft^{2} (57,000 m^{2}). The original layout of the building had 500,000 ft^{2} (46,000 m^{2}) of usable space with about 13,000 ft^{2} (1,200 m^{2}) on each floor. When the building was converted into a hotel and residences, the top story was renumbered as floor 52; it was marketed this way since the ceilings in buildings designed for office use, such as the Gulf and Western Building, are typically higher than ceilings in residential buildings. The floor numbering of the upper stories is offset by seven, so an apartment on floor 27 is actually on the 20th story. When residents buy a condominium, they sign a document that tells them about the floor-numbering discrepancy. According to Trump, the building was equivalent to a standard 60-story apartment structure, leading The New York Times to write: "Seen this way, measuring the converted tower at 52 floors was an act of altitudinal restraint."

==== Original offices ====
Shops and restaurants were planned on two basement levels below the plaza that surrounded the Gulf and Western Building. The Paramount Theater was in the basement underneath the northern end of the building. It had either 532 or 535 seats. When the theater opened in 1970 with its aboveground ticket booth, Architectural Forum said: "This theater is one of the handsomest non-buildings of recent years. We could use more of them." The Paramount Theater subsequently became the Loews Columbus Circle, which was closed in the mid-1990s.

The office stories had ceiling heights of 12 ft (3.7 m), which were retained in the renovation. The Gulf and Western Building originally used asbestos as insulation, a common material used in contemporary structures at the time. After the building's completion, asbestos in New York City buildings was outlawed and the city passed a law that required building renovations to include asbestos removal.

The top floor contained a restaurant called Top of the Park. The restaurant had wallpaper and frosted-glass partitions with animal and plant decorations, decorated by Ellen Lehman McCluskey as an allusion to animals and plants in Central Park and the Central Park Zoo. The space also had red walls and mirrors as decorations, which architectural critic Paul Goldberger described in 1976 as "perhaps the most conspicuous missed chance of recent years in terms of restaurant design". In 1988, Top of the Park was converted to a banquet space with a 200-person main dining room, as well as four smaller rooms fitting between 10 and 75 people.

==== Current hotel and condominiums ====
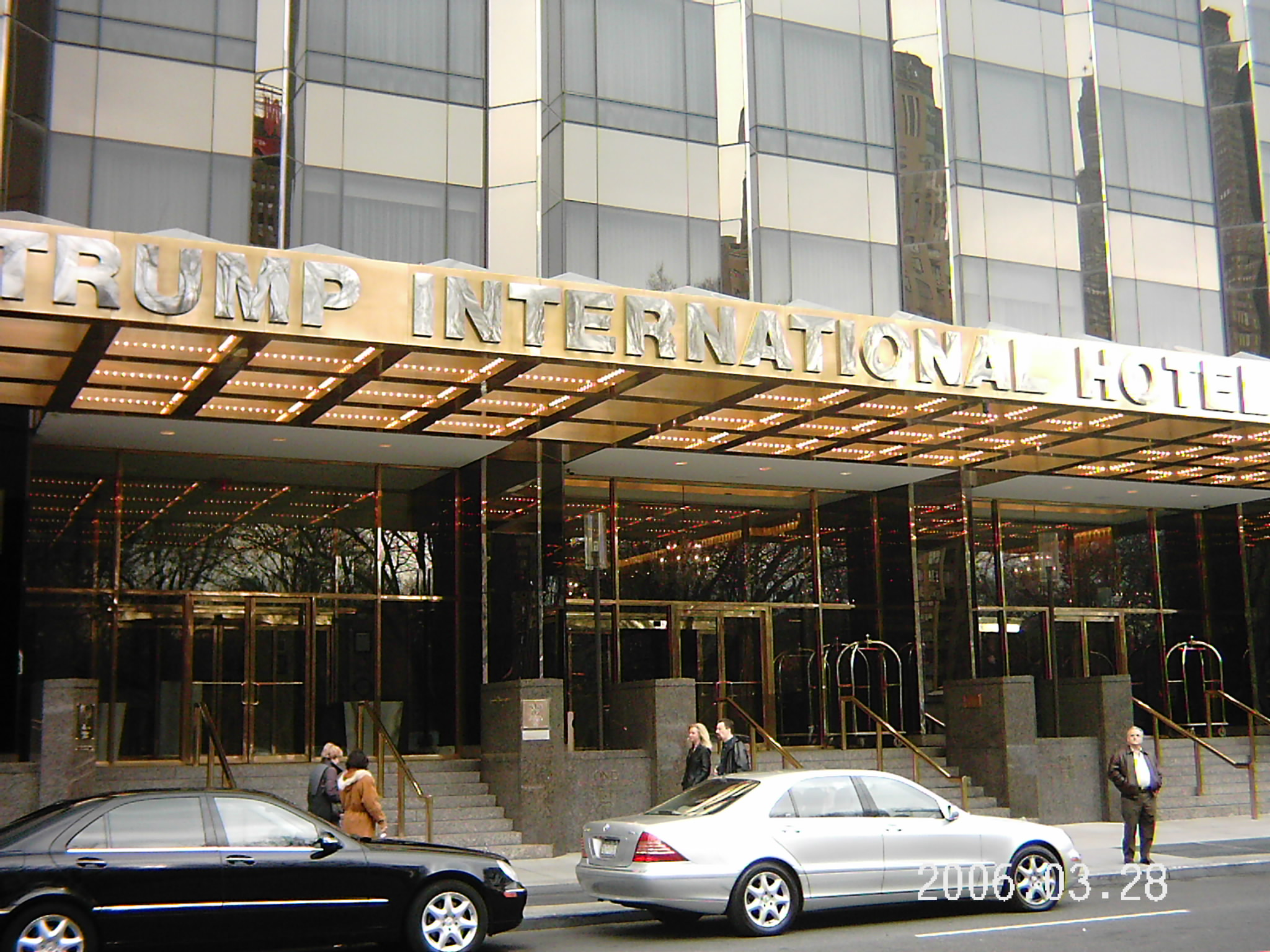
Seen from ground level

French chef Jean-Georges Vongerichten was hired to operate Jean-Georges, a ground-story restaurant at the Trump International Hotel and Tower. Jean-Georges, a Michelin-starred restaurant, serves New French cuisine. The Jean-Georges restaurant space was designed by Adam Tihany, who arranged the space with both a cafe and a main dining room. Adjacent to it is Nougatine, a bar also operated by Vongerichten. Also within the hotel is a fitness center, a 6,000 ft^{2} (560 m^{2}) spa, as well as a business center and a 15-seat boardroom. The fitness center has an indoor pool measuring 55 ft (17 m) long.

The lower portion of the tower, below the 17th story, is used for hotel rooms. There are 168 hotel units (Note: The hotel was originally planned with 167 units.) owned by GE and Galbreath. The units include suites as well as one-bedroom and two-bedroom units. Each unit has a kitchen and large closets; originally, the rooms were all equipped with electronics like a VCR, CD player, fax machine, and TV. Forty of the suites have two bedrooms; each of these has an entry foyer with a toilet, as well as two bathrooms and a living room. In addition, each hotel guest is allowed to use the "Trump Attaché" concierge service. A New York Times critic described the original decor as "not exactly homey" but "highly effective" for a one-night stay. After a renovation in 2010, each room was upgraded with an HDTV.

There are 156 condominium residences (Note: The condominiums were originally planned with 166 units.) on the upper 27 stories. Costas Kondylis designed the layout of the residences. When the renovation had been completed in 1996, there had been 166 condominiums, each of which had 10 ft-tall (3.0 m) ceilings and 9 ft-tall (2.7 m) windows. The living spaces cover up 5,500 ft^{2} (510 m^{2}) each. The condominium units vary in size and arrangement. For instance, one studio apartment has an open kitchen, as well as a long entrance gallery and large closet, while one of the one-bedroom units contains an enclosed kitchen. Some of the two- and three-bedroom units include a living/dining area, kitchen, and entrance gallery, while others include an entrance foyer, a living room–library, a dining alcove, and a kitchen. Seven of the units are larger than the others and are classified as "A-line" units; one of these, a four-bedroom unit on floor 48, has a separate foyer, living room, dining room, and library. Trump's penthouse, on floor 52 (the 44th story), had five bedrooms with marble-clad hallways and bathrooms.

Trump was highly involved in selecting materials for the interior, choosing different woods for each of the three lobbies and picking the marble in the master bathrooms. He also picked finishes for the units' kitchens and bathrooms, spending $10,000 to $25,000 more per unit than he had at his earlier Trump Tower.

== History ==
Columbus Circle was redeveloped in the late 1950s and the 1960s. The renewal of Columbus Circle had been spurred by the development of the New York Coliseum in 1956. The developments had included the construction of 2 Columbus Circle; renovation of storefronts at 240 Central Park South; and new buildings on Broadway between 59th and 68th Streets, just north of Columbus Circle.

=== Gulf and Western Building ===
==== Planning and construction ====
In March 1965, developers Hyman R. and Irving J. Shapiro of the company Forteyn announced their intention to develop a building at 1 Central Park West, the last undeveloped site directly adjacent to Columbus Circle. Harold M. Liebman Associates had designed a 45-story structure for the site, along with a raised plaza. The building would have contained 500,000 ft^{2} (46,000 m^{2}), with 10,500 ft^{2} (980 m^{2}) on each floor, supported by the original foundations of the low-rise structure there. There would have been a glass-and-aluminum facade with a marble mechanical shaft facing west. The Coca-Cola sign of the old building was dismantled starting in August 1965. The Shapiros also relocated four existing tenants of 1 Central Park West into a nearby building they owned.

Demolition of the site was completed in early 1966. That June, Forteyn announced that it had revised plans for the 45-story building. Rather than being an angular structure used for offices, the new plan would have offices only on its first nine stories and restaurant on the tenth story, with the address 15 Columbus Circle. The remaining stories would be cylindrical, with residences inside, and would carry the address 1 Central Park West. Architectural critic Ada Louise Huxtable regarded the plans as "ludicrous", regarding it as a cross between bow-shaped structures like the Phoenix Life Insurance Company Building in Hartford, Connecticut, and circular towers such as Marina City in Chicago. According to Huxtable, "The reasoning here seems to be that ... New York can go two cities one better by building both, one on top of the other".

Forteyn was unable to proceed with construction because it could not get financing for the project. The site was subsequently sold to the Investors Funding Corporation of New York, which in turn leased it to the Realty Equities Corporation. In October 1967, Gulf and Western Industries officially announced it would develop the building at a cost of $20 million. Gulf and Western planned to take the top portion of the new building; it also planned to expand into the lower stories in the future. Realty Equities was to construct the building. A groundbreaking ceremony took place in March 1968. At that time, Gulf and Western increased its space requirements in the new building from 13 to 22 stories. Construction was almost completed by late 1969, but the elevators had not been installed. The elevator-installation workers went on strike in June 1969 and continued their strike for at least four months. As a result, other workers were forced to walk up to their respective floors, leading the city to halt work because workers would not be able to evacuate quickly in an emergency.

==== Office use ====
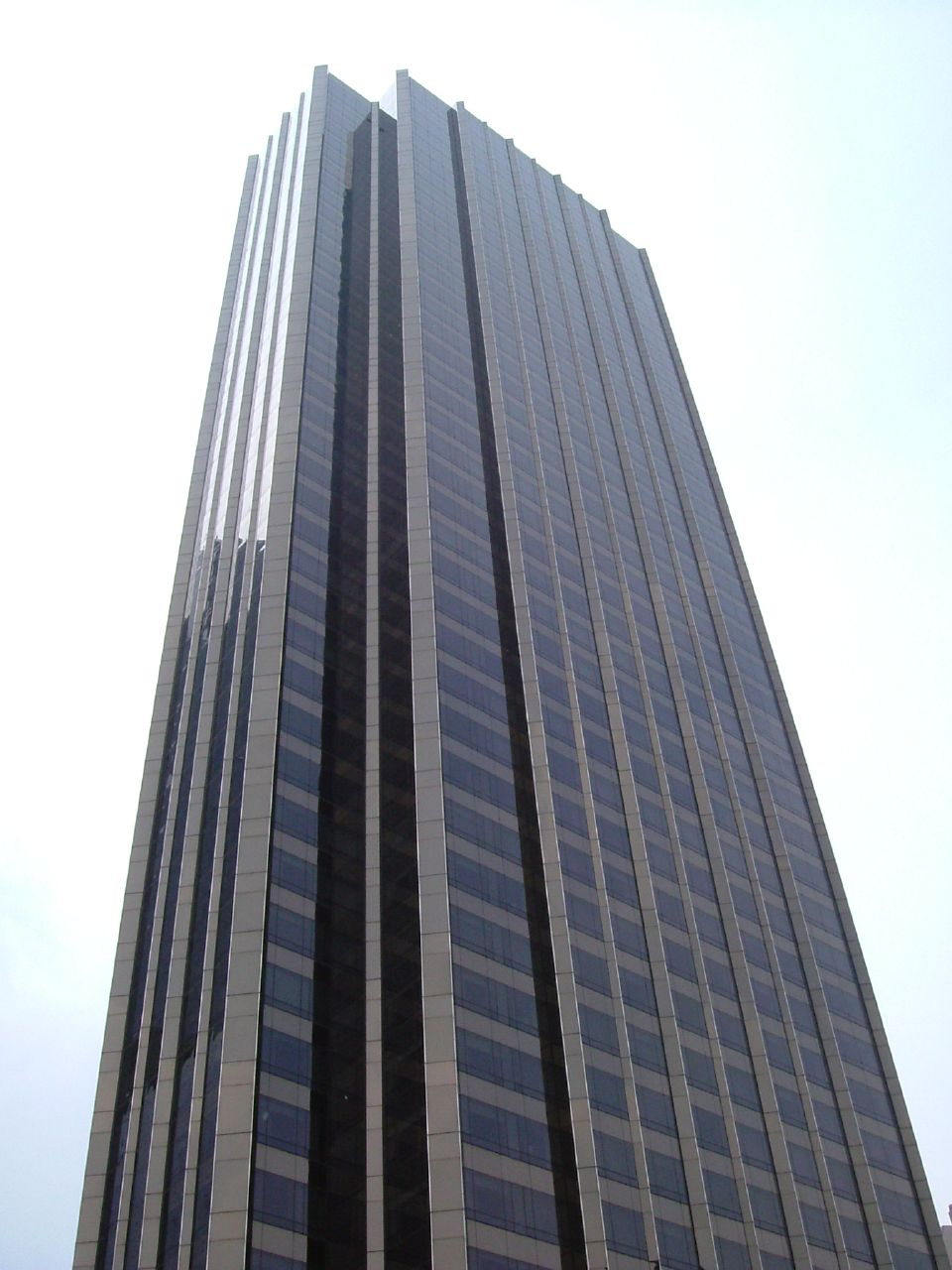
Facade view of the Trump International Hotel and Tower

The building was completed in 1970, with the Paramount Theater opening in the basement that June. Cross & Brown were the leasing agents; the tower's first lessees included accounting firm Seidman and Seidman. During the early 1970s, an awning flew off during a high wind, and a man shot out windows in the Top of the Park restaurant, though no one was killed or seriously injured in either case. A rooftop antenna was installed at the Gulf and Western Building in 1975 to test the Westar satellite system for satellite television. The tower was also damaged in a February 1977 bombing committed by the Puerto Rican nationalist group Fuerzas Armadas de Liberación Nacional Puertorriqueña (FALN), but no one was killed or injured. The Gulf and Western Building was owned by billionaire businessman John D. MacArthur at the time of his death in 1978.

In 1980, the skyscraper's management was transferred from Louis Feil to Cushman & Wakefield. At the time, the tower was owned by Bankers Life, which in turn was operated by the MacArthur Foundation. By 1982, the Gulf and Western Building swayed so much in the wind that its core walls and stairwells had developed cracks and workers had complained of nausea. The swaying also disrupted elevator service. Some marble in the lower stories had cracked and was covered in plywood. This prompted Bankers Life to add a brace between the street and roof at a cost of more than $10 million. The MacArthur Foundation sold Bankers Life and its holdings in 1983 to Boston-based firm First Winthrop. The following year, the MacArthur Foundation sold the Gulf and Western Building and 17 other properties to First Winthrop as part of a transaction worth over $400 million. (Note: The Boston Globe reported the sale at $430 million.) First Winthrop also received a $330 million mortgage from the General Electric (GE) Pension Trust and sold a $336 million ownership stake.

First Winthrop and GE tried to refinance the tower in the late 1980s. However, because the building had included asbestos in its construction, a large insurer would not give a loan, as the presence of asbestos was too risky for the insurer. The refinancing was canceled for an unrelated reason. Restaurant Associates announced in 1988 that it would convert the Top of the Park restaurant into a private banquet facility designed by Adam Tihany. The same year, the Gulf and Western Building's basement was flooded in a water main break. The building was renamed 15 Columbus Circle in January 1989 when Gulf and Western was renamed Paramount Communications. By the early 1990s, Paramount occupied 85 percent of the space, taking floors 2–5 and 13–44, while BDO Seidman occupied another 12 percent.

15 Columbus Circle continued to face both legal and structural issues. In late 1990, a structural engineer published a report about the facade on behalf of the building's owners. The engineer's report said that the badly misaligned facade panels could blow off during high winds and that several exterior columns had cracked. While a sidewalk scaffold had been erected around the building, the report said the panels could fall outside the area covered by the scaffold. The report recommended that "immediate remedial measures" be implemented, but no such measures were taken for over two years. In 1991, GE moved to foreclose on a mortgage on 15 Columbus Circle, and the building's legal owner filed for bankruptcy protection. Paramount was scheduled to relocate when its lease expired in April 1995, leaving the space 85 percent vacant. The cost of repairing the windows, removing asbestos, and fixing the structural issues made the building particularly difficult to market; by 1993, no one had made an offer for the structure.

=== Trump International Hotel and Tower ===
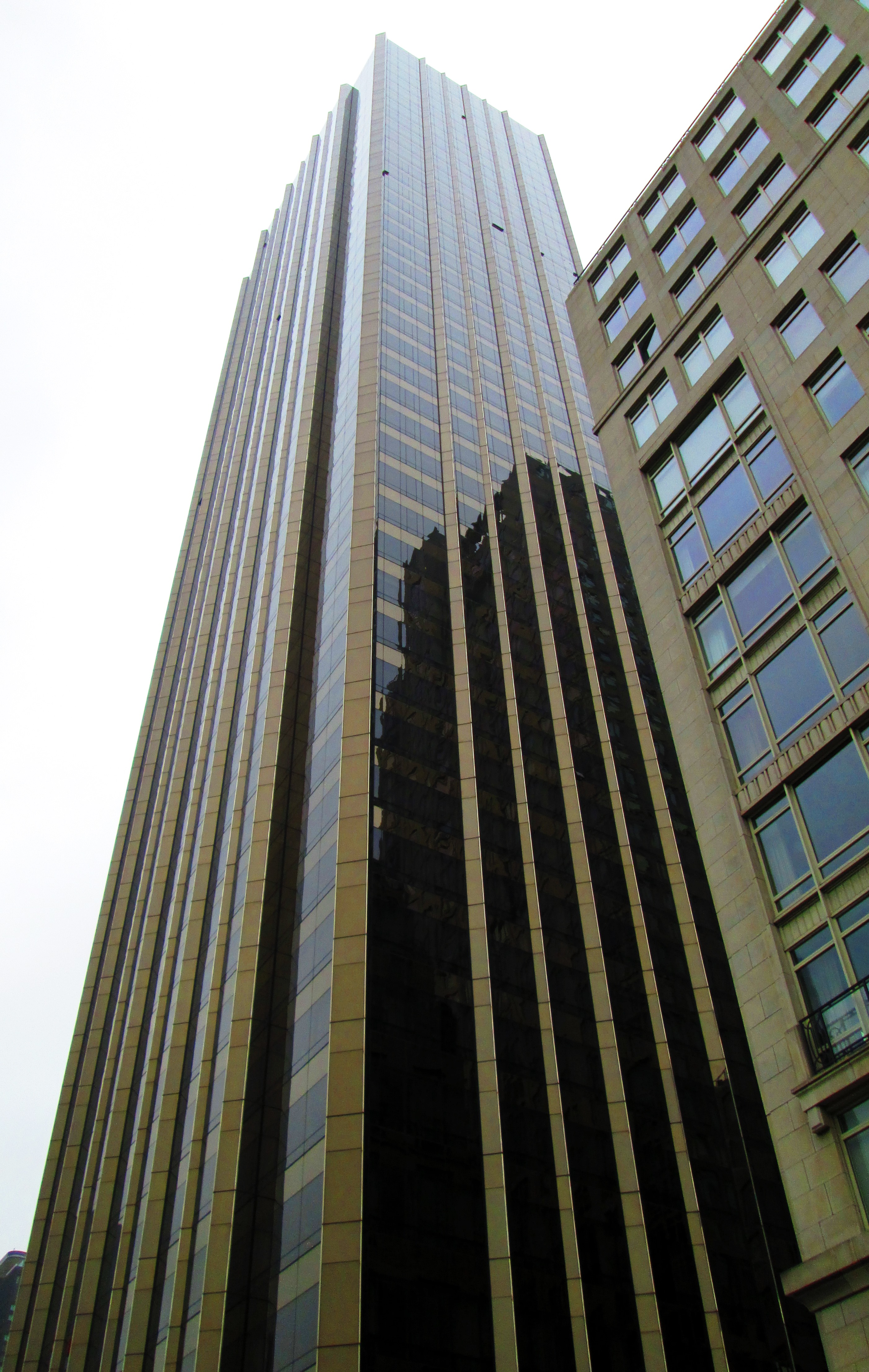
View from 61st Street

GE took title to the building in early 1993, choosing that option over foreclosing on First Winthrop's loan. That year, GE conducted a $2 million renovation to stabilize the facade. Concurrently, GE had hired real estate firm Galbreath Company to conduct a feasibility study for the building's future use. Galbreath recommended that 15 Columbus Circle be converted into a mixed-use property with both residential condominiums and offices.

==== Renovation ====
In March 1994, GE hired businessman and developer Donald Trump, as well as Galbreath, to renovate the tower with residential units on the upper stories. The lower stories would be converted into either a hotel or offices. According to Galbreath's CEO Peter Ricker, Trump was hired because "he has been successful with high-rise condos like no one else has". The building's address would also be changed from 15 Columbus Circle to 1 Central Park West, a more upscale address. Trump considered Philip Johnson, Frank Gehry, and Robert A. M. Stern as possible architects for the conversion. Johnson was hired as the conversion architect in May 1994.

Ricker said the building would have to be deconstructed so its steel frame could be repaired. Trump planned to have trusses and columns installed throughout the building to make the tower rigid and stable. Renovation was chosen over demolition because 1 Central Park West already exceeded the maximum size of a residential building that could be built on the site, so a new building would have been ten to twelve stories shorter. To avoid having to demolish existing stories under zoning law, Trump split the building into permanent residential and short-term hotel components. Office spaces were not included because, according to Galbreath's executive managing director, "the rents were not high enough to support new office construction or rehabilitation". The renovation was to take two years and cost $230 million, with the building being rebranded as the Trump International Hotel and Tower. For the renovation, the joint venture received a $15.9 million tax abatement.

The work could not begin until Paramount moved out. BDO Seidman moved out during July 1994, freeing up most of the space not occupied by Paramount. Just before the beginning of the renovation, Trump replaced the scaffolding that had surrounded 15 Columbus Circle for several years. The renovations began in June 1995, after Paramount moved out. Barbara Corcoran and Louise Sunshine were hired as the sales and marketing directors. Corcoran predicted that many of the units would be purchased by Asian investors. By late 1995, foreign nationals made up half of the buyers for the condominium section. In February 1996, Jean-Georges Vongerichten and Bob Giraldi signed a lease for the ground-floor restaurant space at the Trump International Hotel and Tower.

==== Opening and early years ====
The residential units of Trump International Tower opened in April 1996, at which point sales commenced on the hotel units. Marketing brochures advertised the tower as having "the most important new address in the world". At the time, more than half of the residences had already been sold. This was in part due to what one real-estate agent described as the popularity of Trump's name among international buyers. Trump and his family decided to occupy the penthouse unit of 1 Central Park West. Trump operated a sales office for the tower on Central Park South, with a replica of the tower as well as an eight-minute promotional film. While ownership costs for the condos were initially projected to be $300/ft^{2} ($3,200/m^{2}), by 1997 many of the apartments had sold for $800/ft^{2} ($8,600/m^{2}). After divorcing his wife Marla Maples, Trump rented out the penthouse in 1998, and Italian producer Vittorio Cecchi Gori then purchased the unit.

The Trump International Hotel was not yet open by December 1996, when Trump hosted a party for his New York City employees in the unfinished space. The hotel started accepting guests the following month. According to New York magazine, only one guest checked in on the first day of the hotel's operation. In response, a Trump spokesperson claimed management tried to dissuade too many guests from booking rooms there. Trump called the New York story "totally incorrect", saying the hotel "has the best location in New York City in the hottest hotel market ever". Though the Trump International Hotel was the first hotel to open around Columbus Circle in several decades, its completion spurred the construction of other nearby hotels like the Mandarin Oriental, New York, in the then-under-construction Time Warner Center. The tower's conversion, as a whole, also influenced the development of other projects around Columbus Circle and in the western portion of Midtown Manhattan.

==== 21st century ====
While Trump did not own the building, he received a large payment from GE Pension Trust for its development, as well as a portion of profits from the sale of the condos. Despite his name being on the building, he only operated the restaurant, stores, and rooftop. By 2005, the Trump International Hotel and Tower had the city's most expensive rental apartment, a four-bedroom unit offered at $55,000 per month. Among the units sold at the tower was an apartment that, in 2007, was sold for $18 million and resold on the same day for $21 million. In mid-2009, the tower's penthouse was sold at auction for $18 million as part of a foreclosure proceeding against Cecchi Gori; at the time, it was the largest foreclosure auction in Manhattan. A Russian family bought the penthouse but reneged after learning of the cost to renovate the apartment, and it was ultimately sold in late 2010 for $31 million.

The Trump family announced in November 2009 that it would renovate the 167 hotel rooms over the following year. The work was to be conducted in two phases: half of units would be renovated from January to April while the other half would be renovated from June to September. The renovation was completed in September 2010 at a cost of $30 million. The Jean-Georges restaurant was renovated the same year to designs by Thomas Juul-Hansen. Following that, Juul-Hansen designed a renovation for Nougatine in 2012. After the 2016 United States presidential election, in which Trump was first elected U.S. president, the hotel became the site of occasional protests against his administration. By the late 2010s, residential units at the Trump International Tower were selling for over $3,000/ft^{2} ($32,000/m^{2}), less than units in newer skyscrapers on nearby Billionaires' Row such as 432 Park Avenue and One57.

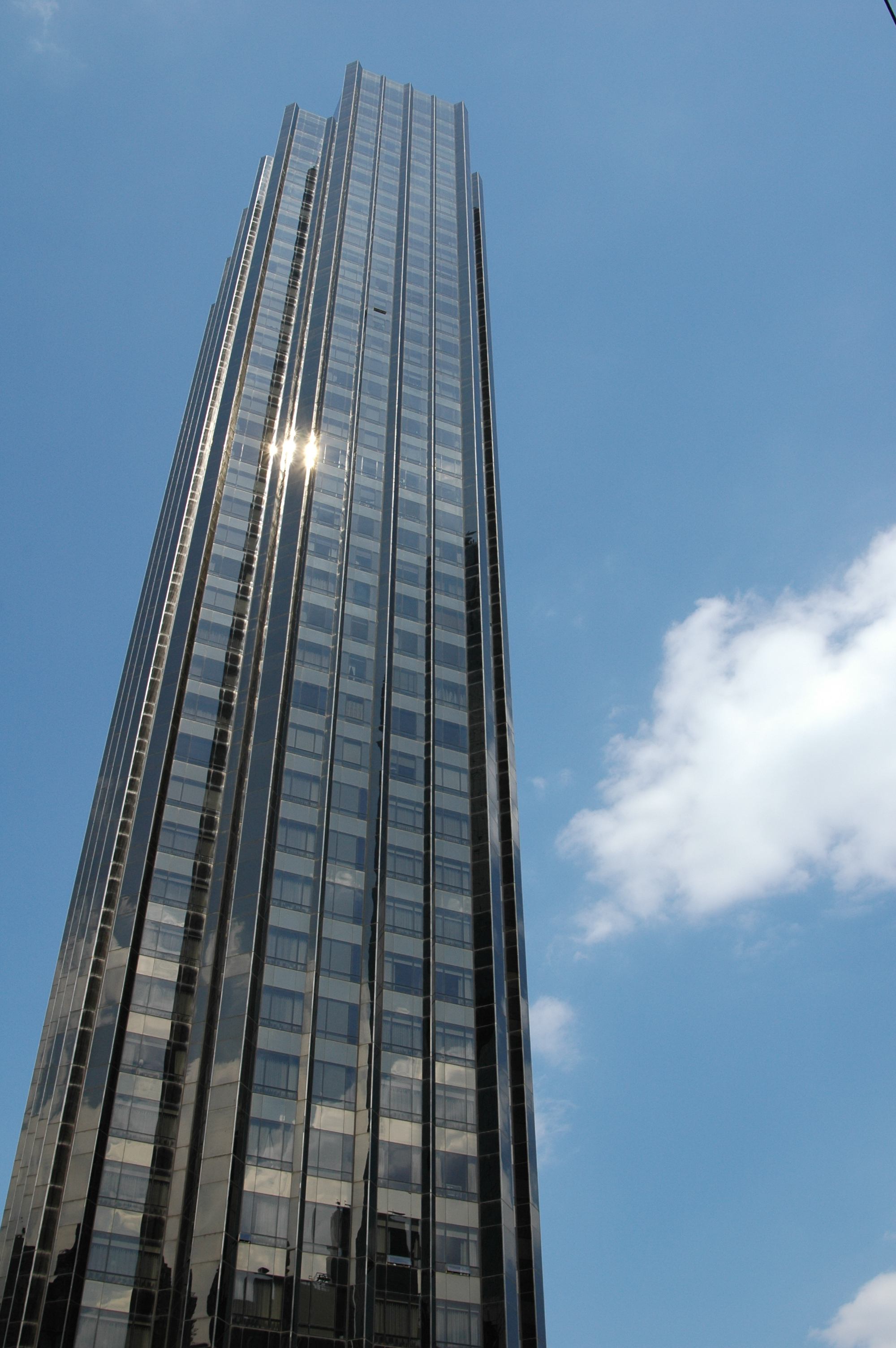
View from Columbus Circle

In June 2019, several condo owners demanded that the property be known simply by its address because the Trump name was diminishing the value of the building. By that August, Trump International's condominium board was considering rebranding the residential section as "One Central Park West" as part of a larger-scale renovation of the building. The hotel section would still carry the Trump name; according to The New York Times, the Trump family considered the hotel's name "untouchable" since the Trump International Hotel in New York City had been the earliest such hotel in the Trump International chain. While the condo board ultimately voted to keep the "Trump International" name for the residences, they also agreed to renovate the marquee on the Central Park West side of the building. As a compromise proposed by Trump's son Donald Trump Jr., the sign on the marquee was changed to display Trump's name on the left and the building's address on the right. An analysis, publicized in February 2024, found that the average per-square-foot cost of a condominium at the Trump International Hotel and Tower had declined since 2016, although Trump's son Eric Trump disputed the findings.

== Critical reception ==
When the Gulf and Western Building was completed, its design was much criticized. Mervyn Rothstein, in The New York Times, wrote that many critics regarded the tower as "too tall, the wrong shape for its site and completely out of context". In 1977, architectural writer Paul Goldberger regarded all the buildings around Columbus Circle as having "no good architecture", writing of the Gulf and Western Building's "boredom" along with the Coliseum's "oppressiveness" and 2 Columbus Circle's "silliness". Robert A. M. Stern said the Gulf and Western Building "was at once a behemoth and a banality, and its contribution to the skyline was notable only as a memorial to lost opportunity". In a 1987 New York magazine poll of "more than 100 prominent New Yorkers", the Gulf and Western Building was one of the ten most disliked structures in New York City. Herbert Muschamp wrote that the original design "neither holds the circle's perimeter edge nor respects the lower scale of the Central Park West buildings beyond".

When the hotel and residential conversion was announced, a writer for Architecture magazine said the gilded design "overpowers the circle" and the statue of Christopher Columbus at its center. Writing for The New York Times in 1995, Muschamp said the design was an "undeniable improvement over the dull dark box that has loomed over this privileged location for the last 25 years", but he found issue with what he called "the symbolic stridency with which its golden skin proclaims the triumph of private enterprise in such a publicly conspicuous place". After writing that article, Muschamp said he got angry comments imploring him to "do something" about the design. Trump, who saw Muschamp's review as negative, occasionally called the critic to ask him to review the hotel again following its opening. Trump even met Muschamp at the Museum of Modern Art to discuss the review.

Upon the renovation's completion, the New York Daily News said that, even with the redesign by Johnson, it had received only "mixed" reception. Martin Filler, writing for The New Republic in 2000, said the design went "from bad to worse", saying: "This meretricious face-lift was more in keeping with Trump's high-roller aesthetic than with the demands of decorum in high-profile public settings."

== See also ==
- List of buildings and structures on Broadway in Manhattan
- List of hotels in New York City
