= Rostral column =

Naval victory monument

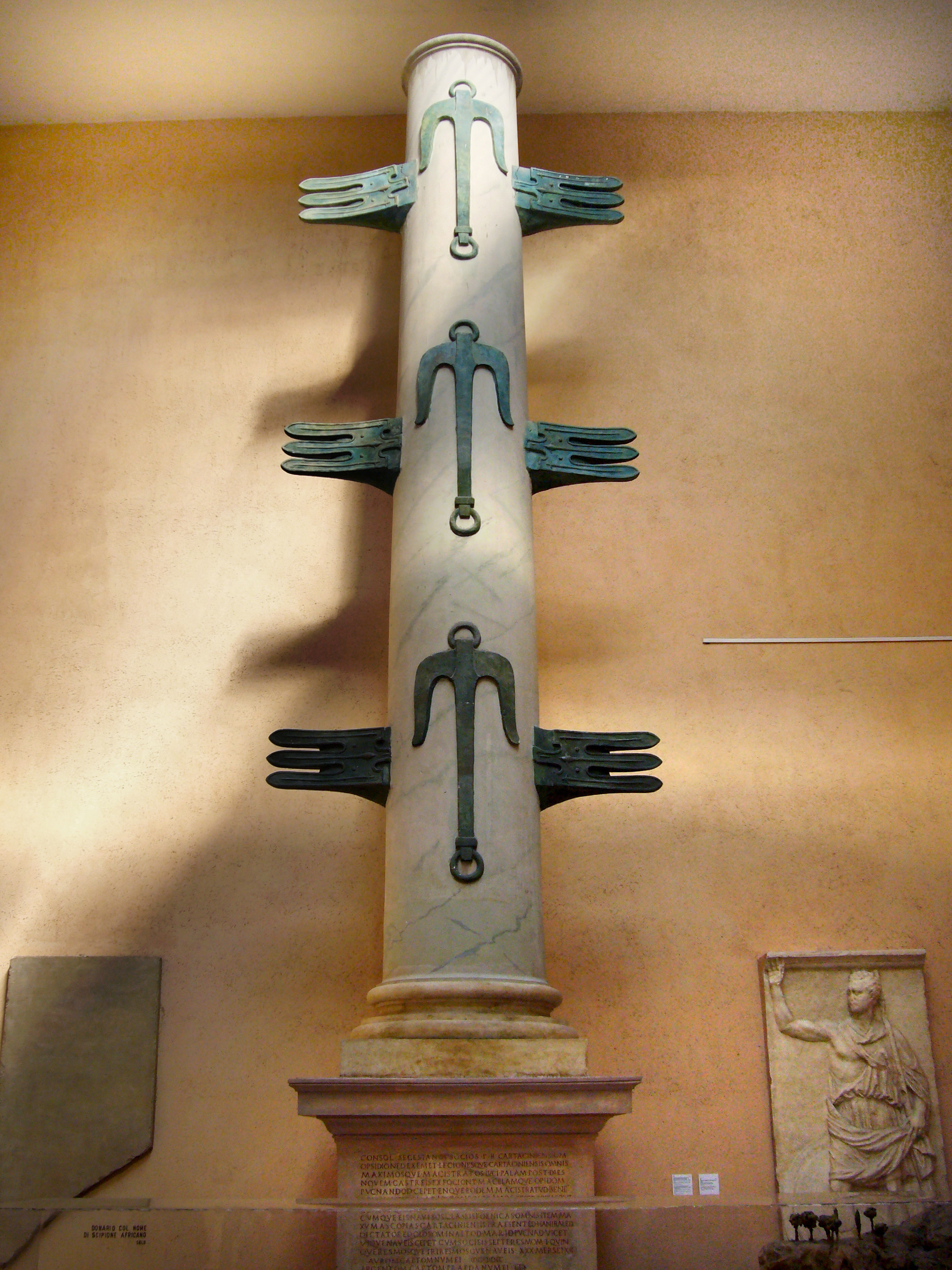
Reproduction of the Rostral Column of Gaius Duilius (c. 260 BC) at the Museum of Roman Civilization, Rome

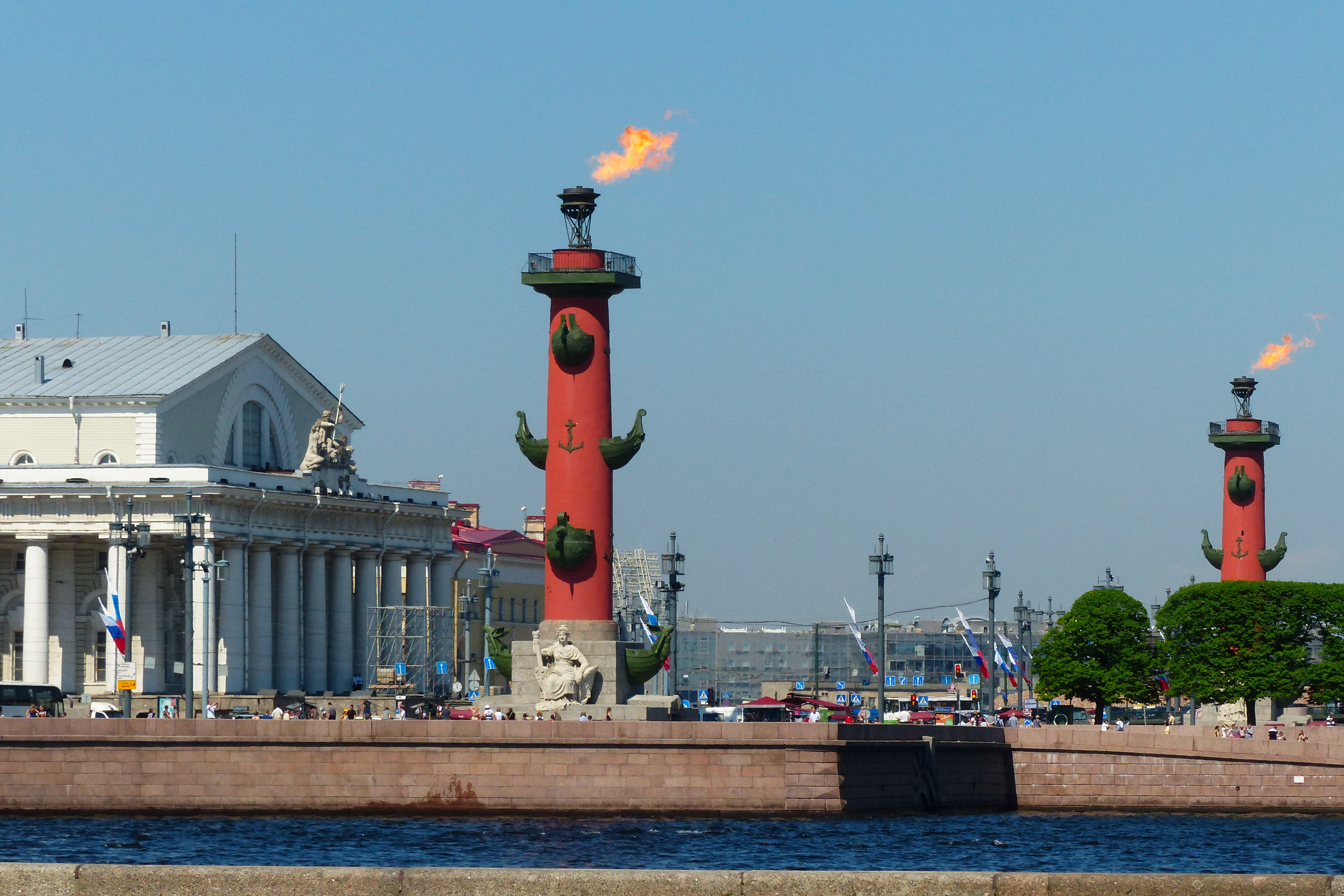
Rostral columns in Saint Petersburg, Russia

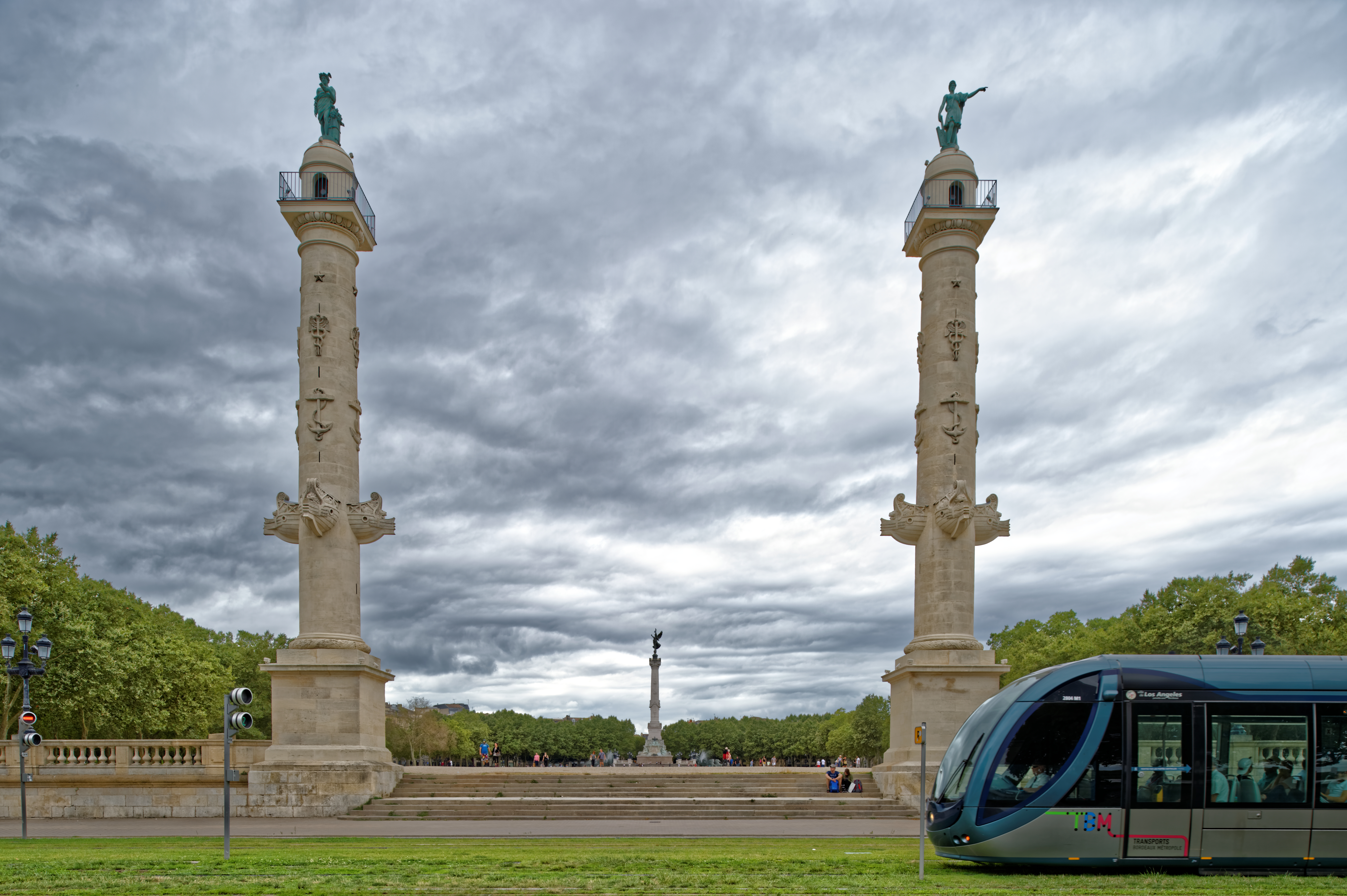
Rostral columns of the Place des Quinconces, Bordeaux, France

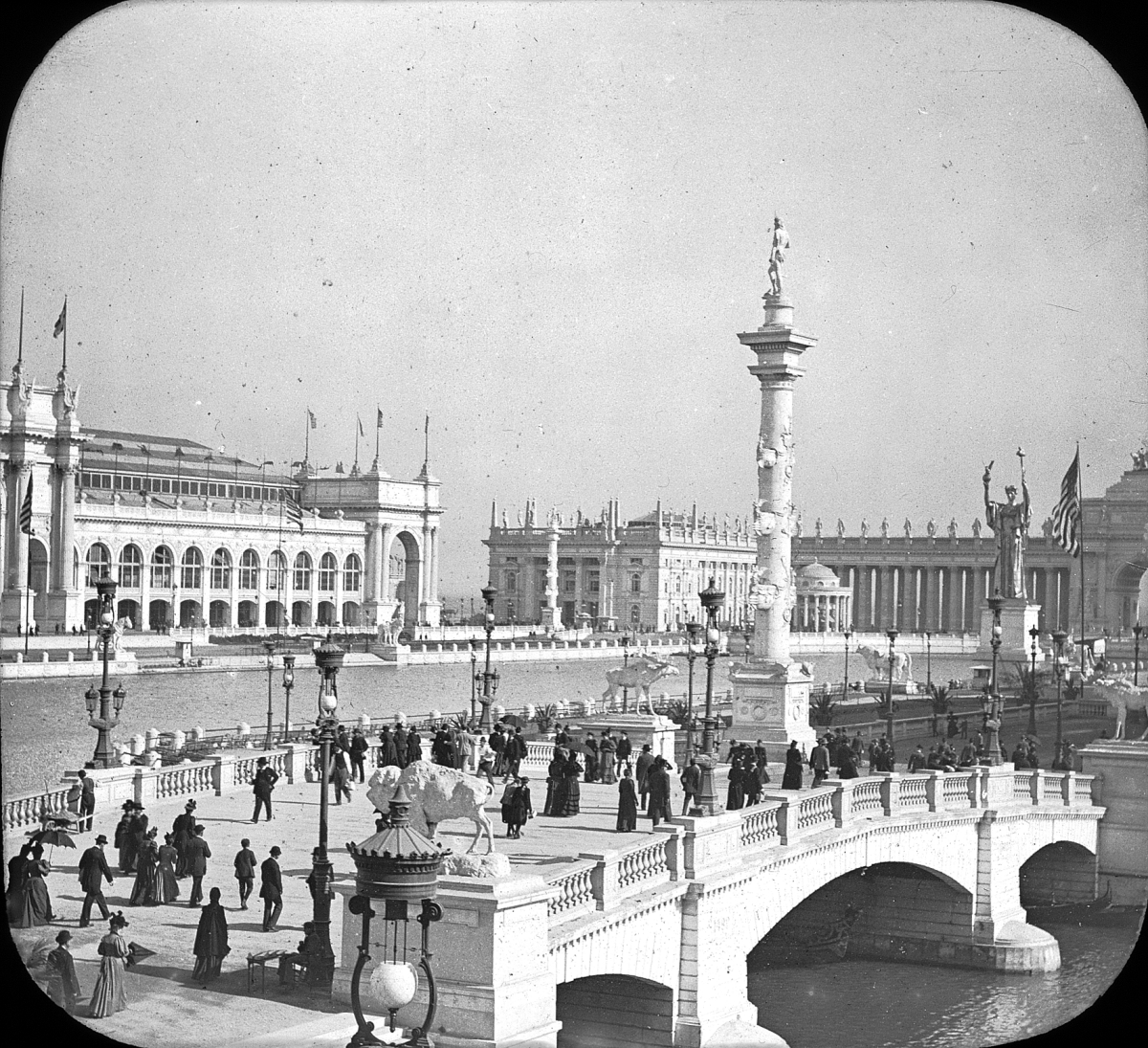
Rostral column, Grand Basin, World's Columbian Exposition, Chicago, Illinois, 1893

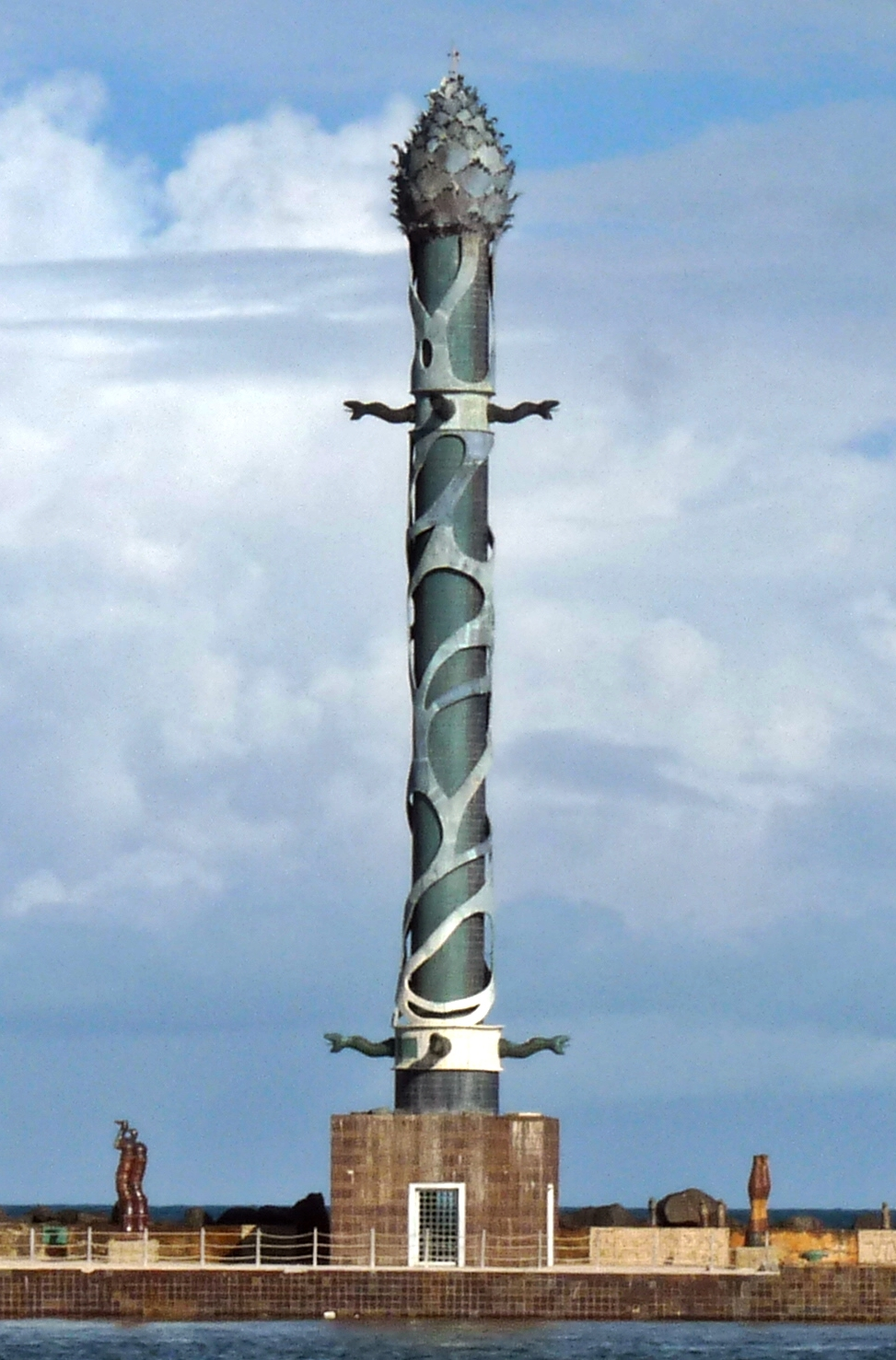
Torre de Cristal in Recife, Brazil

A rostral column is a type of victory column originating in ancient Greece and Rome, where they were erected to commemorate a naval military victory. Its defining characteristic is the integrated prows or rams of ships, representing captured or destroyed enemy ships. The name derives from the Latin rostrum meaning the bow of a naval vessel.

Rostral columns of the modern world include the Columbus Monument at Columbus Circle in New York City, and the paired Saint Petersburg Rostral Columns.

== List of notable rostral columns ==
=== Ancient ===
- Columna Rostrata C. Duilii ("Rostral Column of Gaius Duilius"), celebrating the naval Battle of Mylae (260 BC); formerly in the Roman Forum, some remnants of the inscription are now in the Capitoline Museum.

=== Modern ===
- the Grenville Column, monument to Royal Navy officer Thomas Grenville, on the grounds of Stowe House, Buckinghamshire, England (1749)
- one element of the Tripoli Monument, United States Naval Academy, Annapolis, Maryland (1808)
- Old Saint Petersburg Stock Exchange and Rostral Columns, Saint Petersburg, Russia (1810)
- twin rostral columns in the Place des Quinconces, Bordeaux (1829)
- Place de la Concorde, Paris (1836)
- monument to Wilhelm von Tegetthoff, Praterstern, Vienna (1886)
- Columbus Monument, New York City (1892)
- in the Grand Basin of the World's Columbian Exposition (razed), Chicago, Illinois (1893)
- in Grant Park along the Metra Electric railroad line, Chicago, Illinois (1927-29)
- Cunard War Memorial, Liverpool, England (1920)
- Rostral Column, Vladivostok (ru:Ростральная колонна (Владивосток) in Russian) (1960)
- Rostral Columns, Union Station Plaza, Washington, DC

== See also ==
- Rostra, the raised platforms in ancient Rome, also adorned with the beaks of captured warships, from which orations and pleadings were delivered
