= Columbus Circle =

Traffic circle in Manhattan, New York

- Neighborhood and intersection
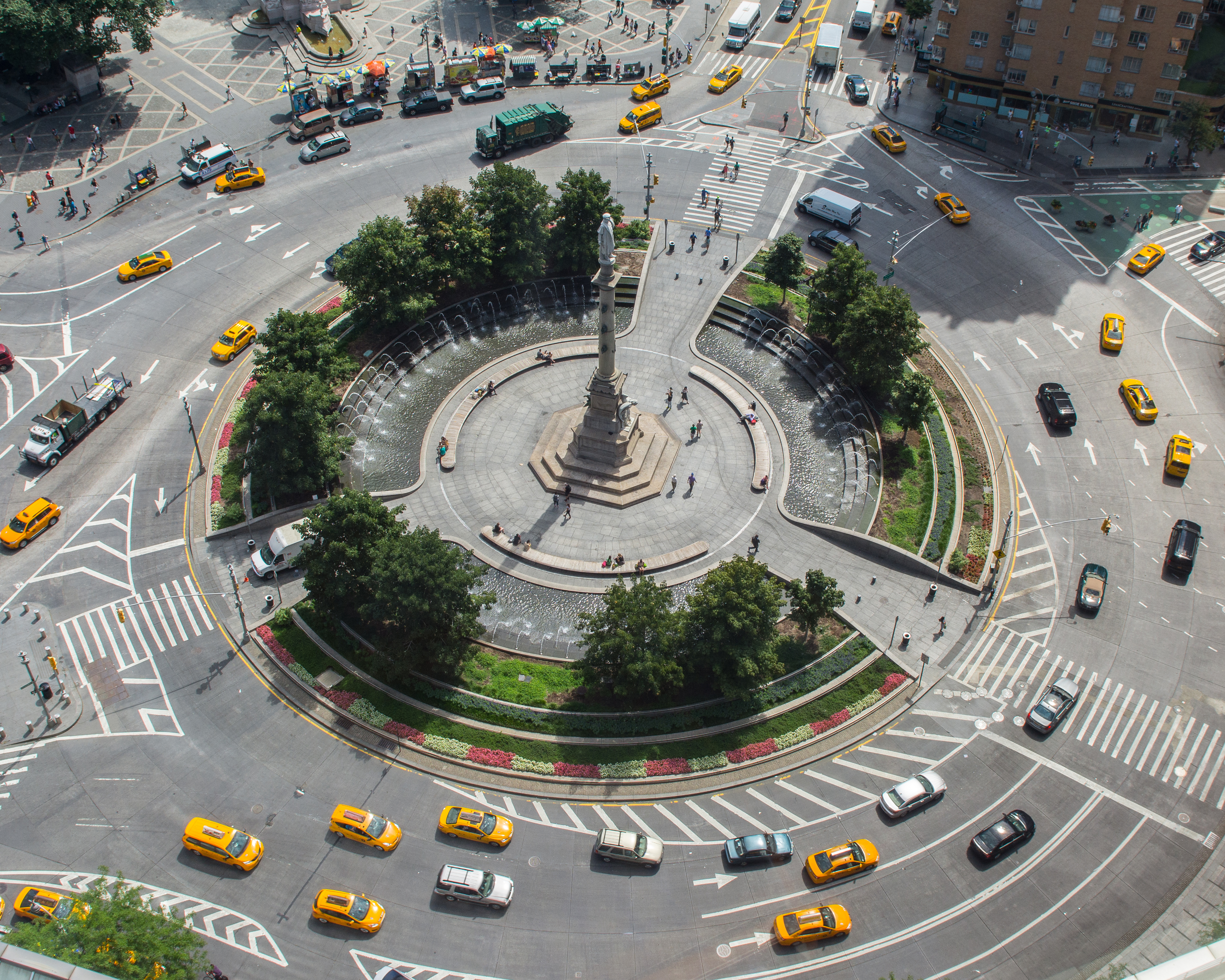
- 2015 view, looking southeast
- Interactive map of Columbus Circle
- Coordinates: 40.769°N 73.982°W
- Country: United States
- State: New York
- City: New York City
- Borough: Manhattan
- Community District: Manhattan 4, Manhattan 7
- Time zone: UTC−05:00 (Eastern)
  - Summer (DST): UTC−04:00 (EDT)
- ZIP Code: 10019
- Area codes: 212, 332, 646, and 917
- Boundaries: 61st Street, Ninth Avenue, 57th Street, Seventh Avenue
- Subway services: 1, A, B, C, and D trains at 59th Street–Columbus Circle station
- Bus routes: M5, M7, M10, M20, M104
- Historical features: Columbus Monument; USS Maine National Monument

Columbus Circle is a traffic circle and busy road junction in the New York City borough of Manhattan, at the intersection of Eighth Avenue, Broadway, Central Park South (West 59th Street), and Central Park West, at the southwest corner of Central Park. The circle is the Kilometre zero, point from which official highway distances from New York City are measured, as well as the center of the 25 miles (40 km) restricted-travel area for C-2 visa holders.

The circle is named after the monument of Christopher Columbus at its center, which is listed on the National Register of Historic Places. The name is also used for the neighborhood that surrounds the circle for a few blocks in each direction. Hell's Kitchen, also known as Clinton, is located to the southwest, and the Theater District is to the southeast and the Lincoln Square section of the Upper West Side is to the northwest.

== History ==
The traffic circle, located at Eighth Avenue/Central Park West, Broadway, and 59th Street/Central Park South, was designed as part of Frederick Law Olmsted's 1857 vision for Central Park, which included a rotary on the southwest corner of the park. It abuts the Merchant's Gate, one of the park's eighteen major gates. Similar plazas were planned at the southeast corner of the park (now Grand Army Plaza), the northeast corner (Duke Ellington Circle), and the northwest corner (Frederick Douglass Circle). Clearing of the land area for the circle started in 1868. The actual circle was approved two years later. The Columbus Monument was placed at the center of the circle in 1892.

Columbus Circle was originally known generically as "The Circle". An 1871 account of the park referred to the roundabout as a "grand circle". After the 1892 installation of the Columbus Column in the circle's center, it became known as "Columbus Circle", although its other names were also used through the 1900s.

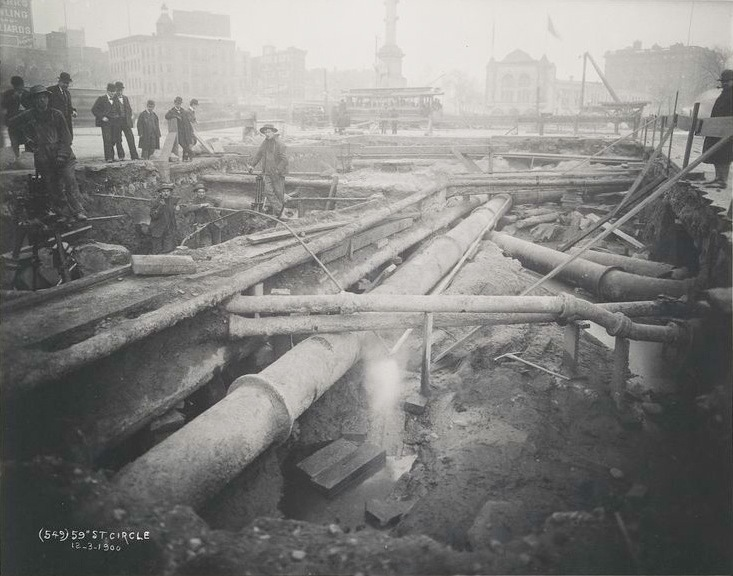
Columbus Circle during construction of the original subway in 1900

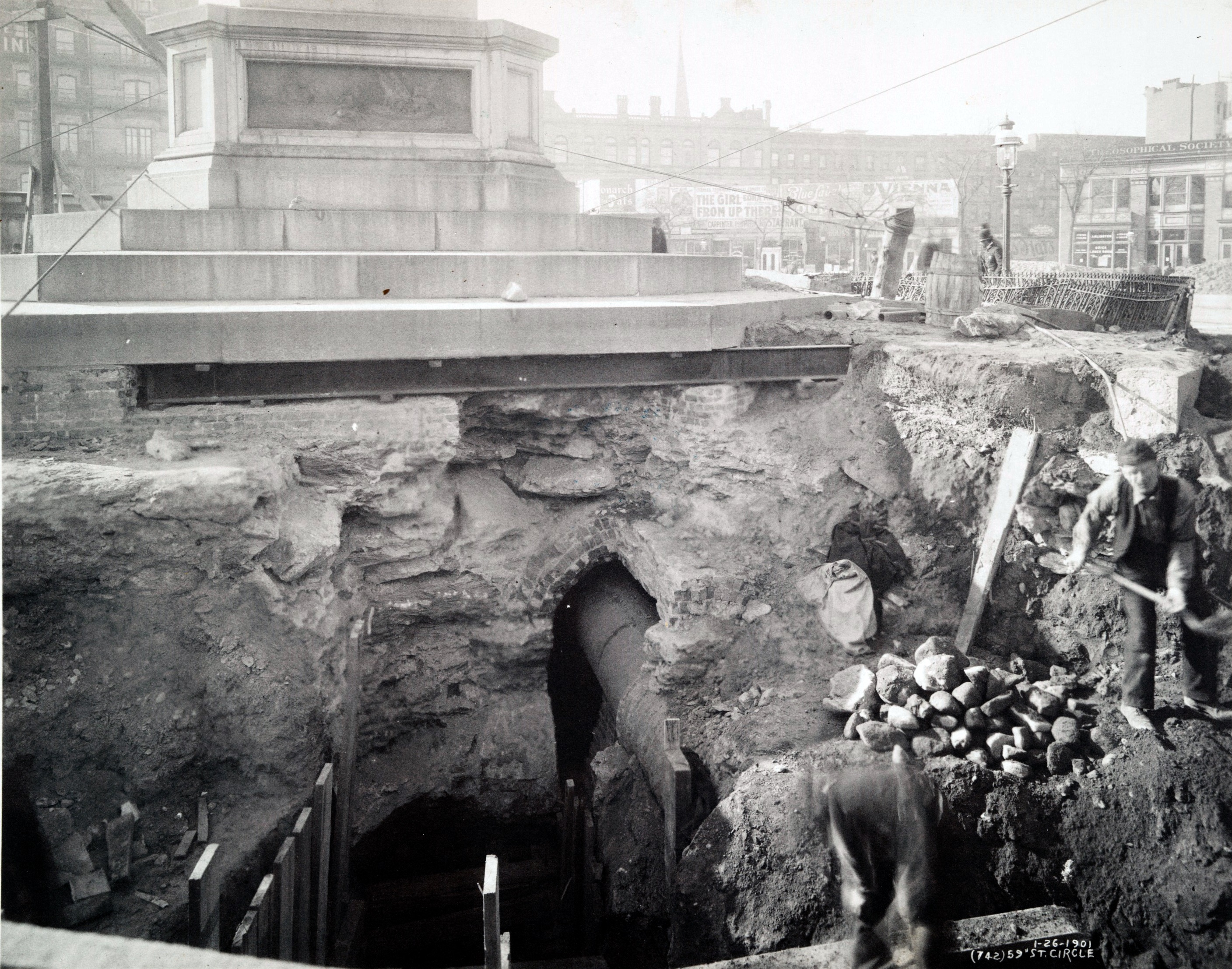
Subway construction under the Columbus monument in 1901

By 1901, construction on the first subway line of the Interborough Rapid Transit Company (now the IRT Broadway–Seventh Avenue Line, used by the 1, 2, and 3 trains) required the excavation of the circle, and the column and streetcar tracks through the area were put on temporary wooden stilts. As part of the subway line's construction, the 59th Street–Columbus Circle station was built underneath the circle. During construction, traffic in the circle was so dangerous that the Municipal Art Society proposed redesigning the roundabout. By February 1904, the station underneath was largely complete, and service on the subway line began on October 27, 1904. The station only served local trains; express trains bypassed the station. The platforms of the IRT subway station were lengthened in 1957–1959, requiring further excavations around Columbus Circle. An additional subway line—the Independent Subway System (IND)'s Eighth Avenue Line, serving the present-day A, B, C, and D trains—was built starting in 1925. At Columbus Circle, workers had to be careful to not disrupt the existing IRT Broadway–Seventh Avenue Line or Columbus Circle overhead. The Columbus monument was shored up during construction, and obstructions to traffic were minimized. The line, which opened in 1932, contains a 4-track, 3-platform express station at 59th Street–Columbus Circle, underneath the original IRT station. The IND station were designed as a single transit hub under Columbus Circle.

=== Conversion to traffic circle ===
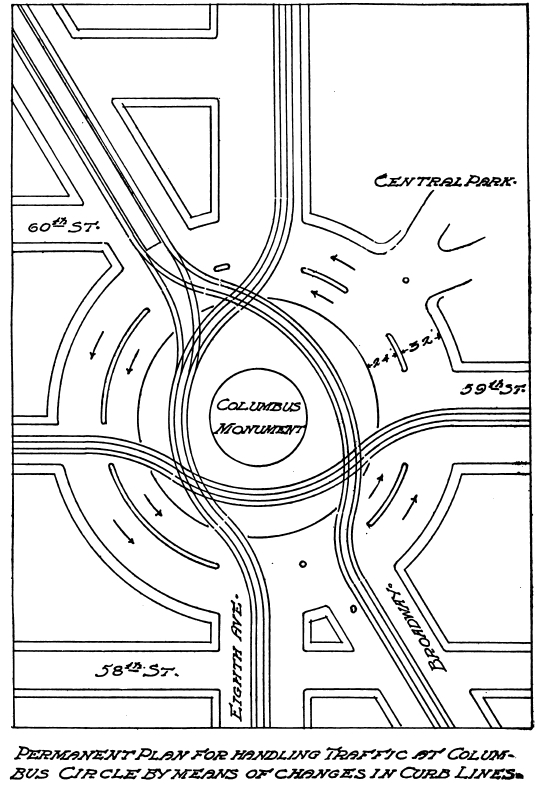
William Phelps Eno's second Columbus Circle plans, developed in 1909

In November 1904, due to the high speeds of cars passing through the circle, the New York City Police Department added tightly spaced electric lights on the inner side of the circle, surrounding the column. The circle was altered in 1905 by William Phelps Eno, a businessman who pioneered many early innovations in road safety and traffic control. In a 1920 book, Eno writes that prior to the implementation of his plan, traffic went around the circle in both directions, causing accidents almost daily. The 1905 plan, which he regarded as temporary, created a counterclockwise traffic pattern with a "safety zone" in the center of the circle for cars stopping; however, the circle was too narrow for the normal flow of traffic. Eno also wrote of a permanent plan, with the safety zones on the outside as well as clearly delineated pedestrian crossings. The redesign marked the first true one-way traffic circle to be constructed anywhere, implementing the ideas of Eugène Hénard. In this second scheme, the public space within the circle, around the monument, was almost as small as the monument's base.

The rotary traffic plan was not successful. A New York Times article in June 1929 stated that the "Christopher Columbus [monument] is safe and serene, but he's the only thing in the Circle that is." At the time, there were eight entrance and exit points to Columbus Circle: two each from 59th Street/Central Park South, to the west and east; Broadway, to the northwest and southeast; Eighth Avenue/Central Park West, to the south and north; and within Central Park to the northeast. (Note: These directions are relative to Manhattan's street grid, which is rotated 29 degrees clockwise from geographic north. So for instance, Broadway really points north and south, while Eighth Avenue/Central Park West points south-southwest and north-northeast respectively.) Moreover, streetcars on the former three streets did not go counterclockwise around the rotary, but rather, both tracks of all three streetcar routes went around one side of the monument, creating frequent conflicts between streetcars and automobiles using the rotary in opposite directions. The police officers patrolling the circle had to manage the 58,000 cars that entered Columbus Circle every 12 hours.

As part of a plan to reorganize traffic in the "Columbus-Central Park Zone", Eno's circular-traffic plan was abolished in November 1929, and traffic was allowed to go around the circle in both directions. Central Park West, a one-way street that formerly carried southbound traffic into the circle, was now one-way northbound. The bidirectional entrance roads into Central Park, which fed into northbound and eastbound West Drive, were both changed to one-way streets because West Drive had been changed from bidirectional to one-way southbound and eastbound. Traffic going straight through Columbus Circle was forced to go around the left side of the monument, while any traffic making turns from the circle had to go counterclockwise around the rotary using the right side.

=== Alterations ===
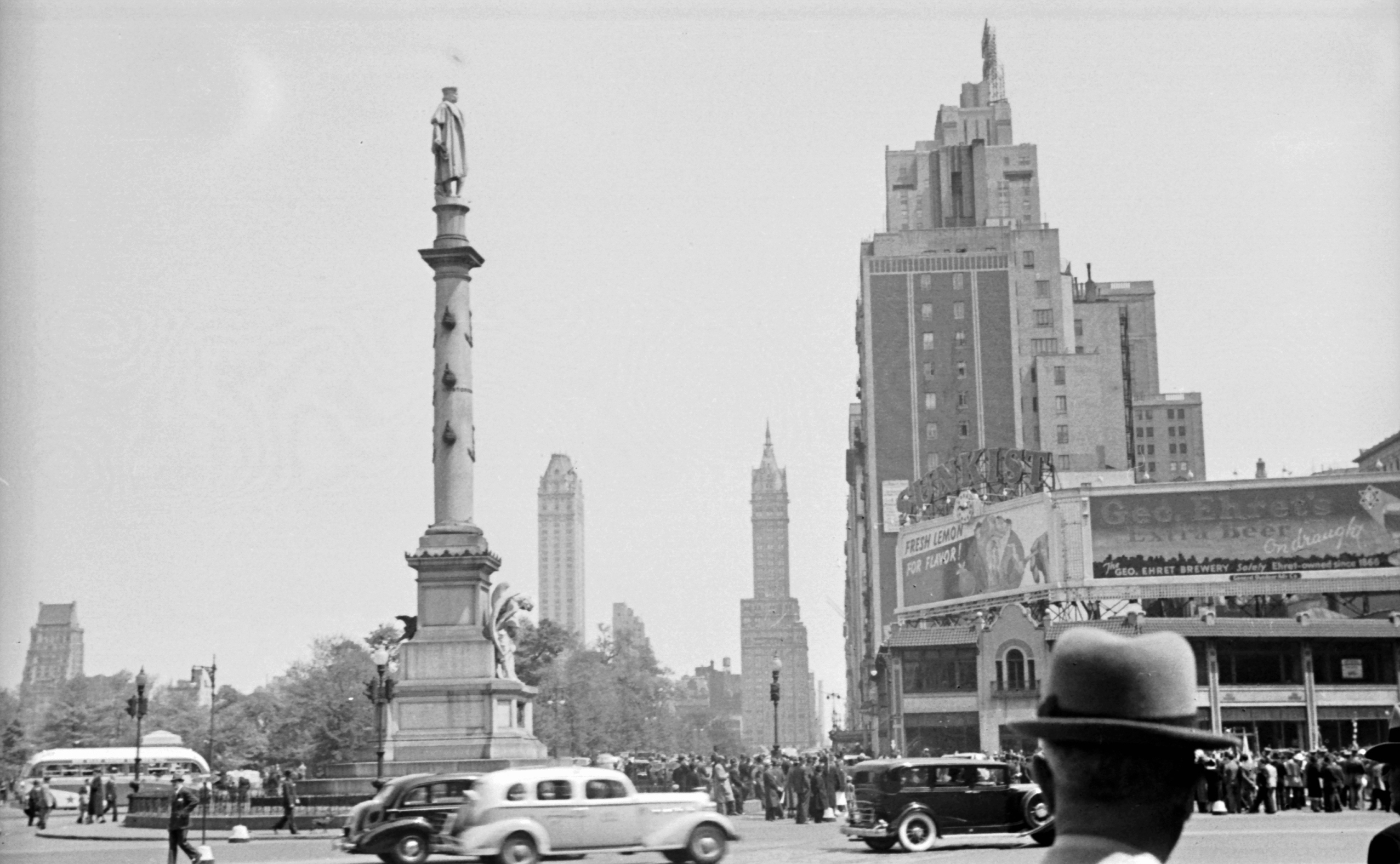
Columbus Circle in 1939

The bidirectional traffic pattern through Columbus Circle failed to eliminate congestion. In 1941, engineers with the New York City Parks Department and the Manhattan Borough President's office formed a tentative agreement to redesign Columbus Circle yet again. "Local" and "express" lanes would segregate north–south traffic passing within the circle. Local north–south traffic and all east–west traffic would go around the circle's perimeter in a counterclockwise direction, along a 45-foot-long (14 m) roadway. Through north–south traffic on Broadway, Eighth Avenue, and Central Park West would use two 71-foot-wide (22 m) divided roadways with 5-foot-wide (1.5 m) landscaped medians, running in chords on either side of the Columbus monument. Traffic from southbound Broadway and northbound Eighth Avenue would use the western chord, and northbound Broadway and southbound Central Park West would use the eastern chord. The center of the circle would be refurbished with a tree-lined plaza, and pedestrian traffic from the north and south would be able to pass through the center of the circle. The exit into Columbus Circle from West Drive would be eliminated, and the entrance to West Drive would be relocated. In a related development, the 59th Street trolley route's tracks would be removed. This was crucial to the reorganization of the circle, as the trolley had already been discontinued.

The proposed reorganization of Columbus Circle was widely praised by civic groups and city officials. On the other hand, William Phelps Eno advocated for a return to his original 1905 proposal. However, the plan still had some issues, the largest of which was that traffic traveling on Broadway in either direction would be routed onto Eighth Avenue or Central Park West, and vice versa. The reconfiguration of the circle was deferred due to World War II. The trolley routes that ran through Columbus Circle were discontinued in 1946, but the bus routes that replaced the trolley lines took the same convoluted paths through the circle. In June 1949, it was announced that the reconstruction of Columbus Circle would finally begin. Work on removing the abandoned trolley tracks commenced in August. In conjunction with Columbus Circle's rehabilitation, the New York City Department of Transportation designed a variable traffic light system for the circle. The project was originally set to be complete by November 1949 at a cost of $100,000. However, delays arose due to the need to maintain traffic flows through the circle during construction. The project was ultimately completed that December.

The entirety of Eighth Avenue south of Columbus Circle was converted to northbound-only traffic in 1950. In 1956, in preparation for the opening of the New York Coliseum on Columbus Circle's west side, traffic on Central Park West and Broadway was rearranged. Central Park West was made northbound-only for a short segment north of the circle, and two blocks of Broadway south of the circle were converted to southbound-only. A new northbound roadway was cut through the southern tip of the center traffic island that contained the statue, from Eighth Avenue to the eastern chord. At the same time, the eastern chord was converted to northbound-only.

=== 1990s and 2000s renovation ===
By the late 20th century, it was regarded as one of the most inhospitable of the city's major intersections, as the interior circle was being used for motorcycle parking, and the circle as a whole was hard for pedestrians to cross. In 1979, noted architecture critic Paul Goldberger said that the intersection was "a chaotic jumble of streets that can be crossed in about 50 different ways—all of them wrong." The next year, landscape architect Laurie Olin was hired to devise plans for the circle. In 1987, the city awarded a $20 million contract to Olin Partnership and Vollmer Associates to create a new design.

The circle was refurbished in 1991–1992 as part of the 500th-anniversary celebration of Columbus's arrival in the Americas. In 1998, as a result of the study, the circular-traffic plan was reinstated, with all traffic going around the circle counterclockwise. The center of the circle was planned for further renovations, with a proposed park 200 feet (61 m) across. The design for a full renovation of the circle was finalized in 2001. The project started in 2003, and was completed in 2005. It included a new water fountain by Water Entertainment Technologies, who also designed the Fountains of Bellagio; benches made of ipe wood; and plantings encircling the monument. The fountain, the main part of the reconstructed circle, contains 99 jets that periodically change in force and speed, with effects ranging between "swollen river, a rushing brook, a driving rain or a gentle shower". Three pathways extend southeast (directly along Central Park South), southwest, and north at 120-degree angles to each other. The inner circle is about 36,000 square feet (3,300 m^{2}), while the outer circle is around 148,000 square feet (13,700 m^{2}). Bollards and trees were placed on the outer sidewalk. The redesign was the recipient of the 2006 American Society of Landscape Architects' General Design Award Of Honor. In 2007 Columbus Circle was awarded the Rudy Bruner Award for Urban Excellence silver medal.

== Monument ==
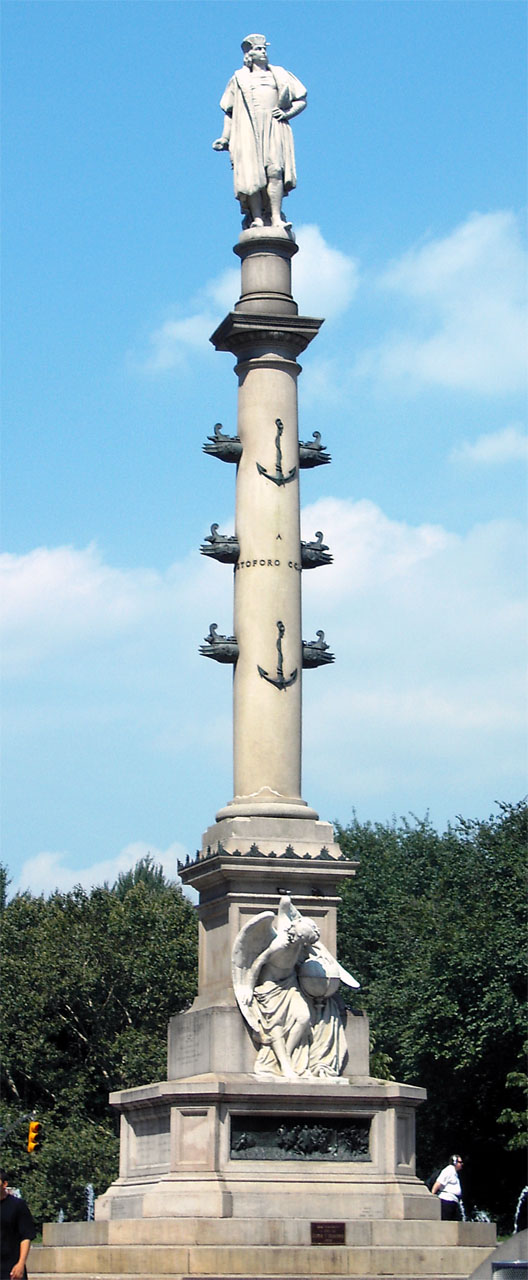
Columbus Monument on Columbus Circle in September 2006

The Columbus Monument, a 76-foot (23 m) column installed at the center of Columbus Circle, consists of a 14-foot (4.3 m) marble statue of Columbus atop a 27.5-foot (8.4 m) granite rostral column on a four-stepped granite pedestal. Created by Italian sculptor Gaetano Russo, the monument was installed at the center of the circle in 1892. It is listed on the National Register of Historic Places.

== Neighborhood ==
The five streets radiating from the circle separate the immediate surrounding area into five distinct portions.

In the early 20th century, much of the development around Columbus Circle was spurred by magazine publisher William Randolph Hearst, who acquired several plots before he ultimately erected the Hearst Magazine Building at Eighth Avenue and 57th Street in 1928. (Note: Hearst's first purchase was the southern side of the circle, now 2 Columbus Circle, in 1895. He bought the block to the south, now 3 Columbus Circle, in 1903. Eight years after that, Hearst bought a plot on the northern side of Columbus Circle. In 1921, Hearst completed his acquisition of lots on the northern side of 58th Street west of Eighth Avenue. None of these structures were ultimately built, except for that on the northern plot.) Hearst had envisioned the creation of a large Midtown headquarters for his company near Columbus Circle, in the belief that the area would become the city's next large entertainment district. By the late 1920s, Hearst was acquiring large amounts of land in the area in an effort to create a "Hearst Plaza" near Columbus Circle. The Hearst Magazine Building, later expanded into the Hearst Tower, is the only remnant of this scheme, the other parts of the proposal having collapsed in the Great Depression.

=== West ===
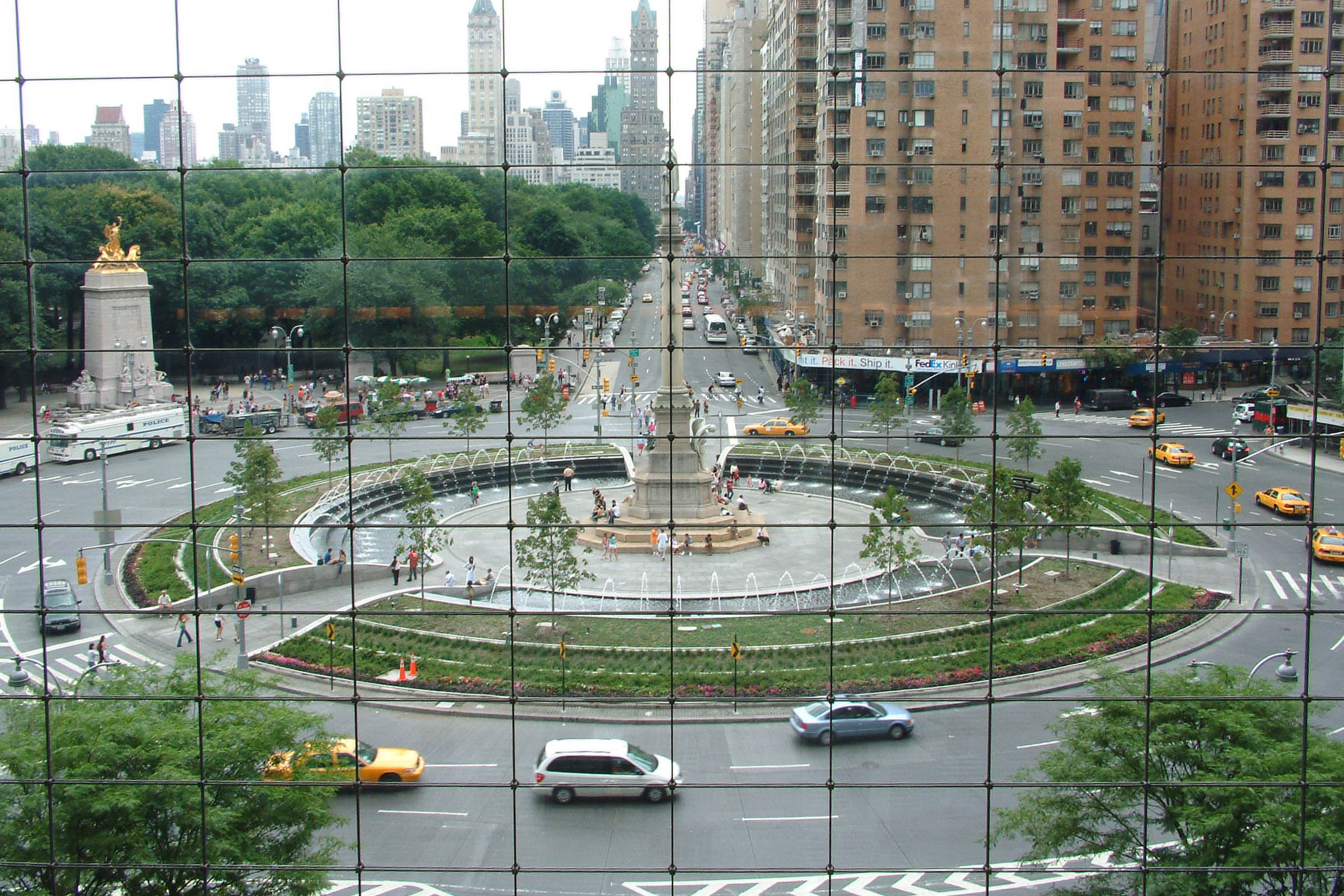
Columbus Circle looking east toward Central Park South from Deutsche Bank Center

To the west of the circle is a superblock spanning two streets, bounded by Broadway, 60th Street, Ninth Avenue, 58th Street, and Eighth Avenue. The superblock was formerly two separate blocks. In 1901 the first theatre built in the Columbus Circle area, the Circle Theatre, was built. From 1902 to 1954, the Majestic Theatre occupied the more southerly of the two blocks.

Robert Moses closed and eliminated that block of 59th Street during the New York Coliseum's construction from 1954 to 1956. The construction project, in turn, was the culmination of an effort to remove San Juan Hill, the slum that had been located at the site. Until the Jacob K. Javits Convention Center was built in Hell's Kitchen in the 1980s, the Coliseum was the primary event venue for New York City. By 1985, there were plans to replace the Coliseum, and after a series of delays, the Coliseum was demolished in 2000.

Since 2003, the site has been occupied by Deutsche Bank Center (originally Time Warner Center). The center consists of a pair of 750-foot (230 m) towers 53 stories high. The complex also hosts the Shops at Columbus Circle mall, Jazz at Lincoln Center, the New York City studio headquarters of CNN, and the Mandarin Oriental, New York hotel. The mall inside the complex includes prestigious restaurants in the center such as Bad Roman, Per Se, and Masa.

=== North ===
The north side of Columbus Circle is bounded by Broadway, Central Park West, and 61st Street. In 1911, Hearst bought this city block. The plot was developed with a three-story building by 1914, designed by Charles E. Birge. Its superstructure was designed to support the weight of a 30-story tower that was never built.

The 44-story Gulf and Western Building (later the Trump International Hotel and Tower) was completed on the site in 1969 or 1970. It served in this capacity until the conglomerate filed for bankruptcy in 1991. In 1994, Donald Trump announced his plans to convert the building into a mixed-purpose hotel and condominium tower. Renovations started in 1995, and were completed by 1997. The building was stripped to its steel skeleton and reclad in a new facade, becoming the Trump International Hotel and Tower. The steel globe outside the building was installed in this renovation.

=== Northeast ===
On the northeast lies the Merchant's Gate to Central Park, dominated by the USS Maine National Monument. The USS Maine monument was designed by Harold Van Buren Magonigle and sculpted by Attilio Piccirilli, who did the colossal group and figures, and Charles Keck, who was responsible for the "In Memoriam" plaque. An imposing Beaux-Arts edifice of marble and gilded bronze, it was dedicated in 1913 and was funded by Hearst. The statue is a memorial to sailors killed aboard the battleship USS Maine, whose mysterious 1898 explosion in Havana harbor precipitated the Spanish–American War.

=== South ===
Actors' Equity was founded in 1913 in the old Pabst Grand Circle Hotel, on the southern side of the circle.

The original structure at 2 Columbus Circle was torn down in 1960. It was replaced by 2 Columbus Circle, an International Modernist tower designed by architect Edward Durrell Stone to house the Huntington Hartford Gallery of Modern Art. Vacated when the city's Department of Cultural Affairs departed in 1998, 2 Columbus Circle was listed as one of the World Monuments Fund's "100 most endangered sites" in 2006. After a renovation by architect Brad Cloepfil, the building became the new home of the Museum of Arts and Design in 2008. Its radical transformation was controversial for the failure of the city's Landmarks Preservation Commission to hold hearings on its worthiness for designation.

=== Southeast ===
Several buildings are on the block bordering the circle's southeast section. 240 Central Park South, a balconied moderne apartment building across Broadway from the museum, is directly on the southeast corner of the circle. Built between 1939 and 1940 to designs by Albert Mayer and Julian Whittlesey, it is a city-designated landmark and a National Registered Historic Place. 240 Central Park South has 28 stories across two apartment blocks, and is variously quoted as having either 325, 326, or 327 apartments. The building contains several roof gardens, and from the outset, was marketed toward people who wanted suburban lifestyles.

On Central Park South, just east of 240 Central Park South, is the Gainsborough Studios. Designed by Charles W. Buckham, it was built between 1907 and 1908 as artists' cooperative housing, and rises 16 stories with 34 studio units, some of them double-story units. The facade has a bust of the English painter Thomas Gainsborough, a bas-relief by Isidore Konti, and tile murals by Henry Chapman Mercer. It is a New York City designated landmark.

To the east of 240 Central Park South and the Gainsborough Studios is 220 Central Park South, a 70-story residential skyscraper designed by Robert A.M. Stern Architects and SLCE Architects, and completed in 2019. The building contains some of the most expensive residences ever sold in New York City.

On 58th Street, east of 220 Central Park South, are two New York City designated landmarks: the Helen Miller Gould Stable and the firehouse of Engine Company 23. The four-story horse stable, at 213 West 58th Street, was designed by York and Sawyer in the French Renaissance style for wealthy philanthropist Helen Miller Gould. Completed in 1902–1903 on the site of an existing stable, the stable became Allan Murray's shoe shop in the 1950s, and has served as the Unity Center of Practical Christianity since 1982. It has a limestone base with a large entrance arch; a limestone-and-brick facade on the second and third stories; a bracketed cornice over the third story; and a hip roof on the fourth story, with a dormer window. The stable was one of several on that block of West 58th Street in the early 20th century, and is the only remaining former stable on the block.

The adjoining firehouse of Engine Company 23, at 215 West 58th Street, was designed by Alexander H. Stevens (the New York City Fire Department's superintendent of buildings) in the Beaux-Arts style. It was constructed between 1905 and 1906 to replace a former firehouse at 233 West 58th Street, now taken up by the 240 Central Park South apartment building. The design contains an arched fire truck entrance at ground level; a limestone-and-brick facade on the second and third stories, with two small windows flanking a large window on each story; a bracket above the second story; and a parapet atop the third story. The building remains an active firehouse of the FDNY.

=== 3, 4, 5, and 6 Columbus Circle ===
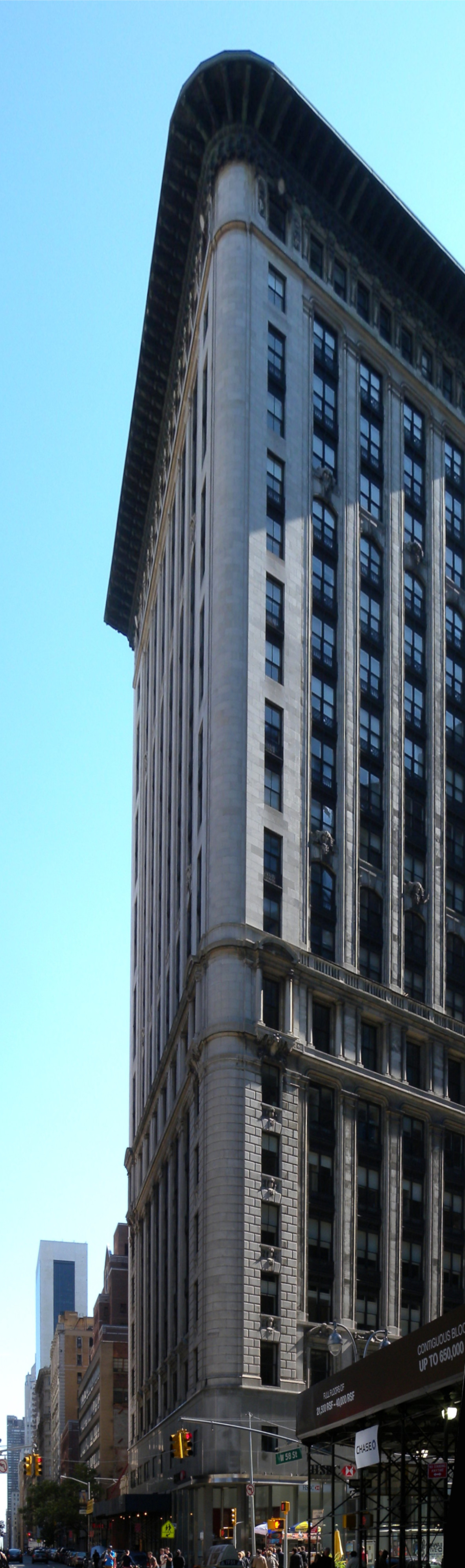
U.S. Rubber Headquarters at 1790 Broadway in 2010

3, 4, 5, and 6 Columbus Circle are the numbers given to four buildings on the south side of 58th Street. From east to west, the buildings are numbered 5, 3, 4, and 6 Columbus Circle.

5 Columbus Circle (also known by its address, 1790 Broadway), is a 286-foot (87 m), 20-story tower on the southeast corner of Broadway and 58th Street. It was originally built as the headquarters of the United States Rubber Company (U.S. Rubber) in 1912. It was part of Broadway's "Automobile Row" during the early 20th century. The lobby contains part of a flagship store for Nordstrom, which extends into the Central Park Tower and 1776 Broadway.

Between Eighth Avenue and Broadway on the south side of 58th Street is 3 Columbus Circle (also 1775 Broadway), a 310-foot (94 m), 26-story tower. It is occupied by Young & Rubicam, Bank of America, Chase Bank, and Gilder Gagnon Howe & Co. The tower sits atop a 3-story structure called the Colonnade Building. The first three stories were built in 1923 and the top 23 stories were added in 1927–1928. During the expansion, the original building's three-story Ionic supports were kept. The new expansion, designed by Shreve & Lamb, hosted General Motors' headquarters from 1927 to 1968. In 1969, Midtown Realty purchased the building's lease, and in 1980, acquired the land. Half of the building was leased by Bankers Trust until the late 1980s, and Newsweek leased a third of the building from 1994 until 2006. When the Moinian Group purchased the building in 2000, the building assumed its current name; a subsequent renovation refurbished the exterior and removed all remnants of the Colonnade Building. A neon sign for CNN was located on the roof of the building from the mid-2000s to 2015. A Nordstrom annex is at the base of 3 Columbus Circle.

4 Columbus Circle, an eight-story low-rise located at 989 Eighth Avenue at the southwest corner of the intersection with 58th Street, was built in the late 1980s. Swanke Hayden Connell Architects designed the building, which houses the furniture company Steelcase on the upper floors and a Duane Reade and a Starbucks on the ground floor. Cerberus Capital Management bought the building in 2006 for $82.9 million. In 2011, it was sold to German real estate firm GLL Real Estate Partners for $96.5 million.

Directly to the west is 6 Columbus Circle, an 88-room, 12-floor boutique hotel called 6 Columbus. Acquired by the Pomeranc Group in 2007, the hotel was put on sale in December 2015. A 700-foot-tall (210 m) tower is planned for the site.

== Transportation ==
The M5, M7, M10, M20 and M104 buses all serve the circle, with the M5, M7, M20 and M104 providing through service and the southbound M10 terminating near the circle. Under the circle is the New York City Subway's 59th Street–Columbus Circle station, served by the 1, 2, A, B, C, and D trains.

== Cultural significance ==
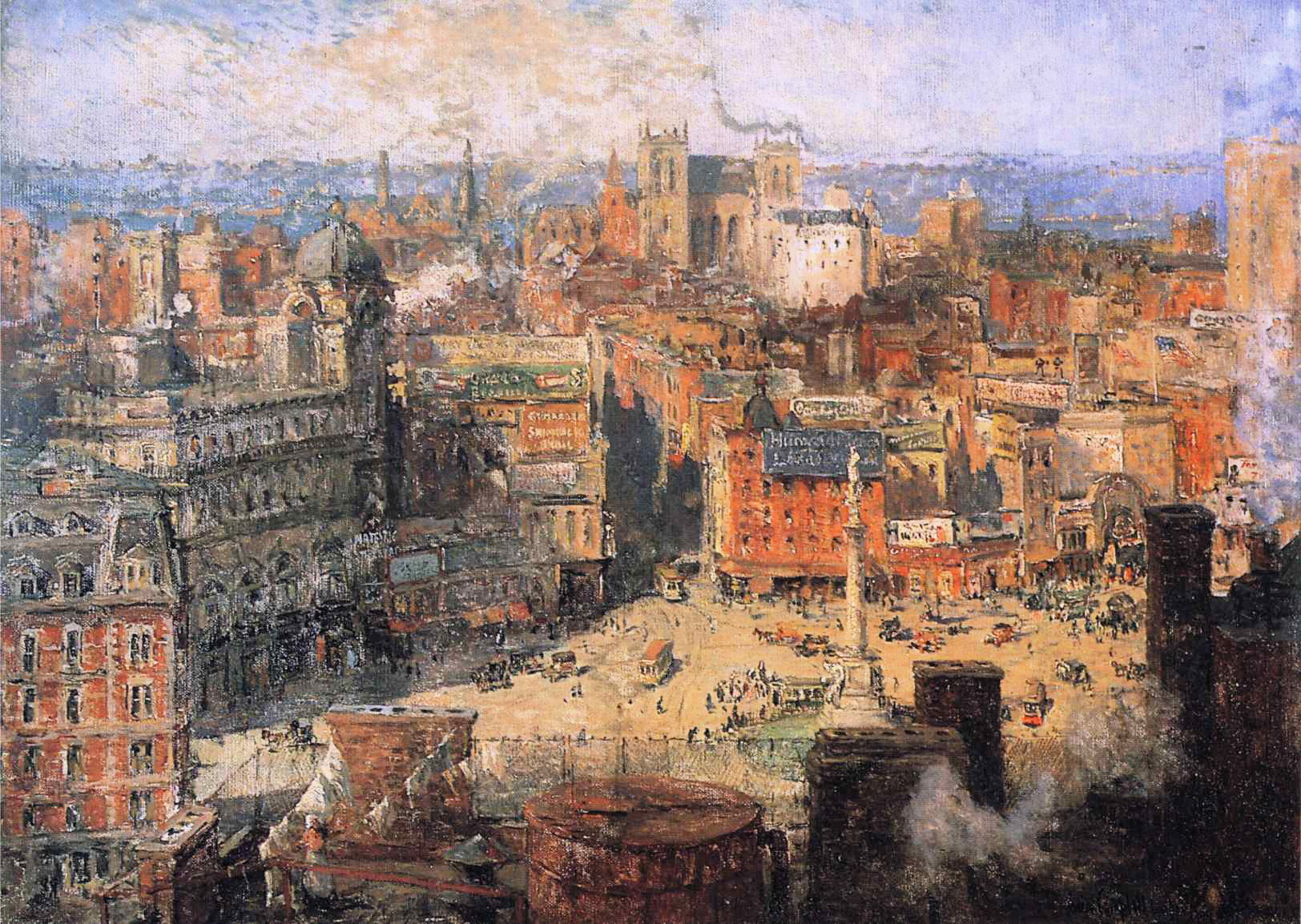
Colin Campbell Cooper's 1909 impressionist portrait, Columbus Circle, part of the Allentown Art Museum collection in Allentown, Pennsylvania

=== Geographic center ===
Columbus Circle is the traditional municipal zero-mile point from which all official city distances are measured, although Google Maps uses New York City Hall for this purpose. Hagstrom also sold maps that showed the areas within 25 miles (40 km) or 75 miles (121 km) from Columbus Circle.

The travel area for recipients of a C-2 visa, which is issued for the purpose of immediate and continuous transit to or from the headquarters of the United Nations, is limited to a 25-mile radius of Columbus Circle. The same circle coincidentally defines the city's "film zone" that local unions operate in, a counterpart to Los Angeles' studio zone. The New York City government employee handbook considers a trip beyond a 75-mile radius from Columbus Circle as long-distance travel.

=== As a center for soapbox orators ===
The circle became known as a center for soapbox orators in the early-mid 20th century, comparable to Speakers Corner in London. It became a home particularly for non-leftists in contrast to Union Square, and for a time in the late 1930s it became a home to a number of far right speakers. The area sometimes had a poor reputation for cranks and street preachers, the "lunatic fringe whose tub-thumping make a nightmare of Columbus Circle" condemned by a New York Court of Appeals ruling in a case related to elsewhere in the city, that prompted mid-20th century configurations, but was also sometimes showcased by the national government as a rambunctious symbol of American freedom of speech.

=== In popular culture ===
Columbus Circle was featured in the 1954 romantic comedy film It Should Happen to You, in which Judy Holliday's character, Gladys Glover, began her quest for fame by renting a large billboard overlooking Columbus Circle. The USS Maine Memorial, was featured in the 1976 movie Taxi Driver, where Robert De Niro's character was thwarted in an attempt to assassinate a presidential nominee. Columbus Circle was featured in the 1984 movie Ghostbusters as the place where the Stay Puft Marshmallow Man manifests and then walks up Central Park West. The shooting of Joseph Colombo in Columbus Circle by Jerome A. Johnson in 1971 was featured in the 2019 film The Irishman. Starting in seasons 6 of the TV show The Venture Bros., the Venture family relocates to a skyscraper located on Columbus Circle.

== Gallery ==
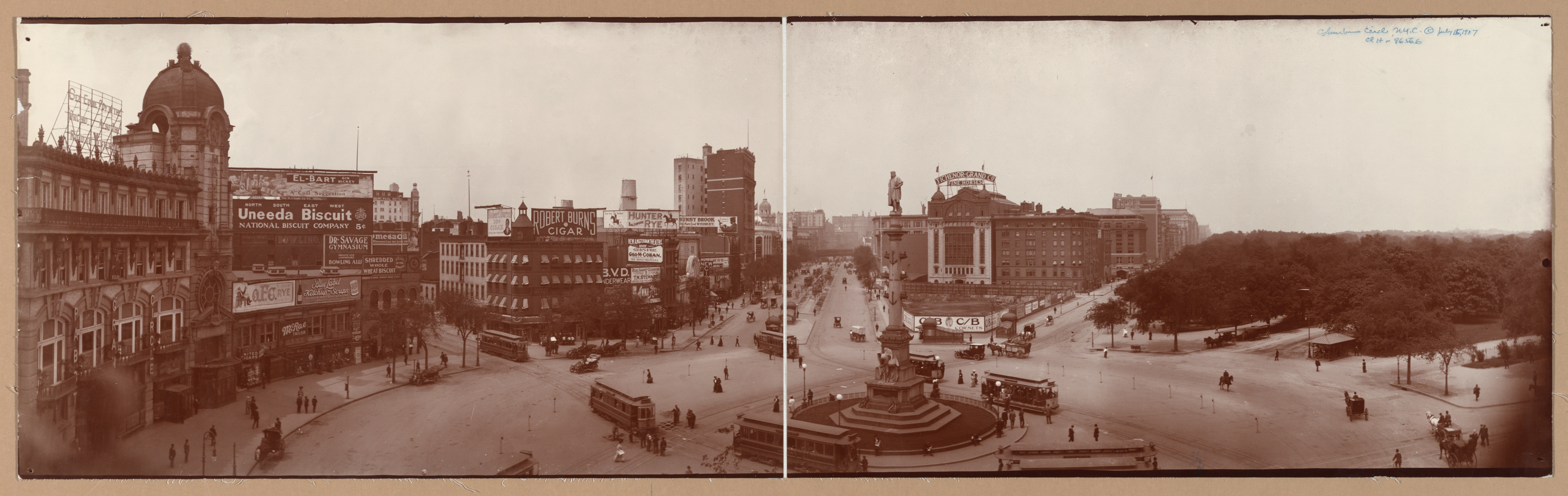
Columbus Circle, c. 1907
Around Columbus Circle today

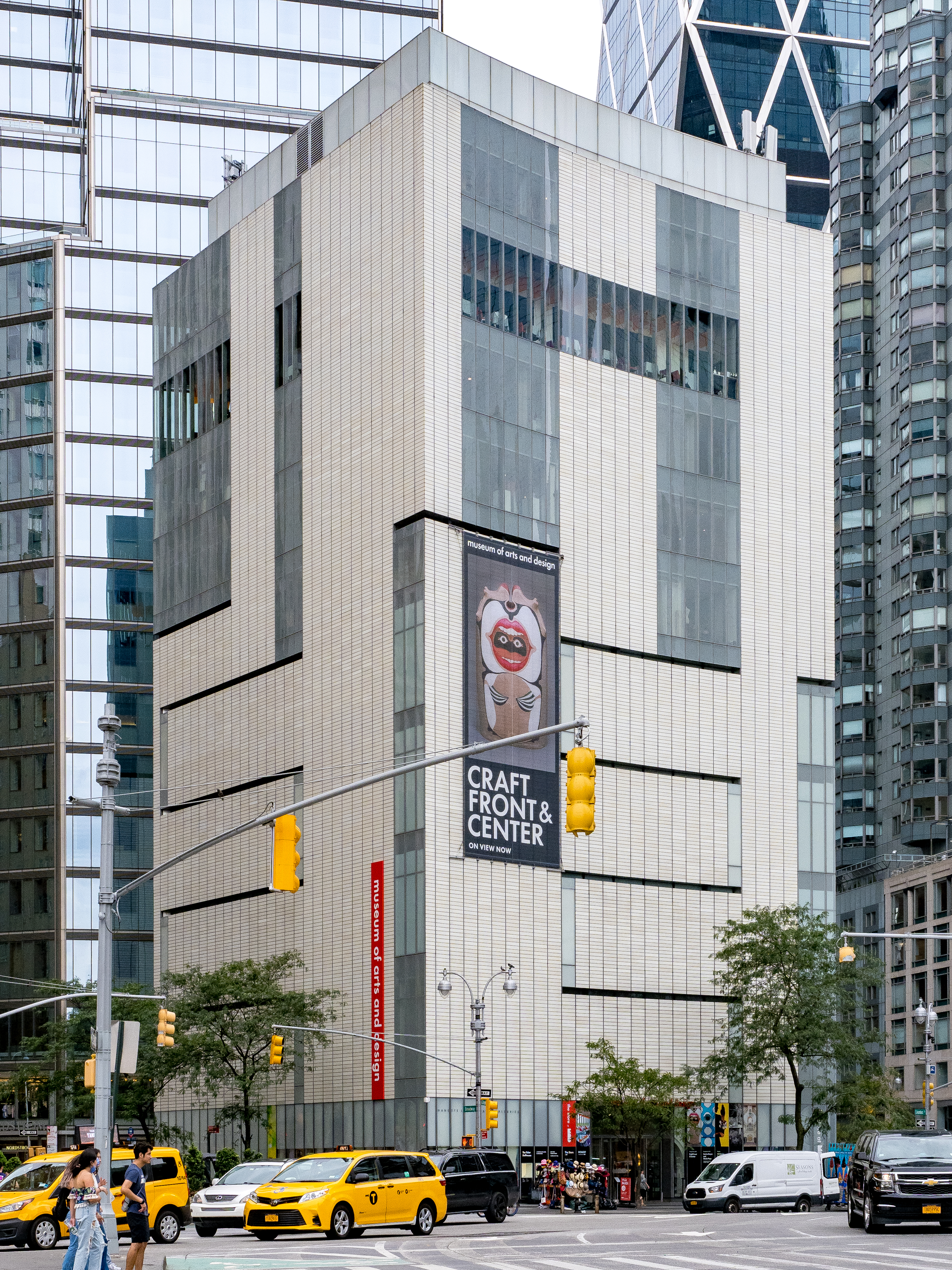
The Museum of Arts & Design at 2 Columbus Circle

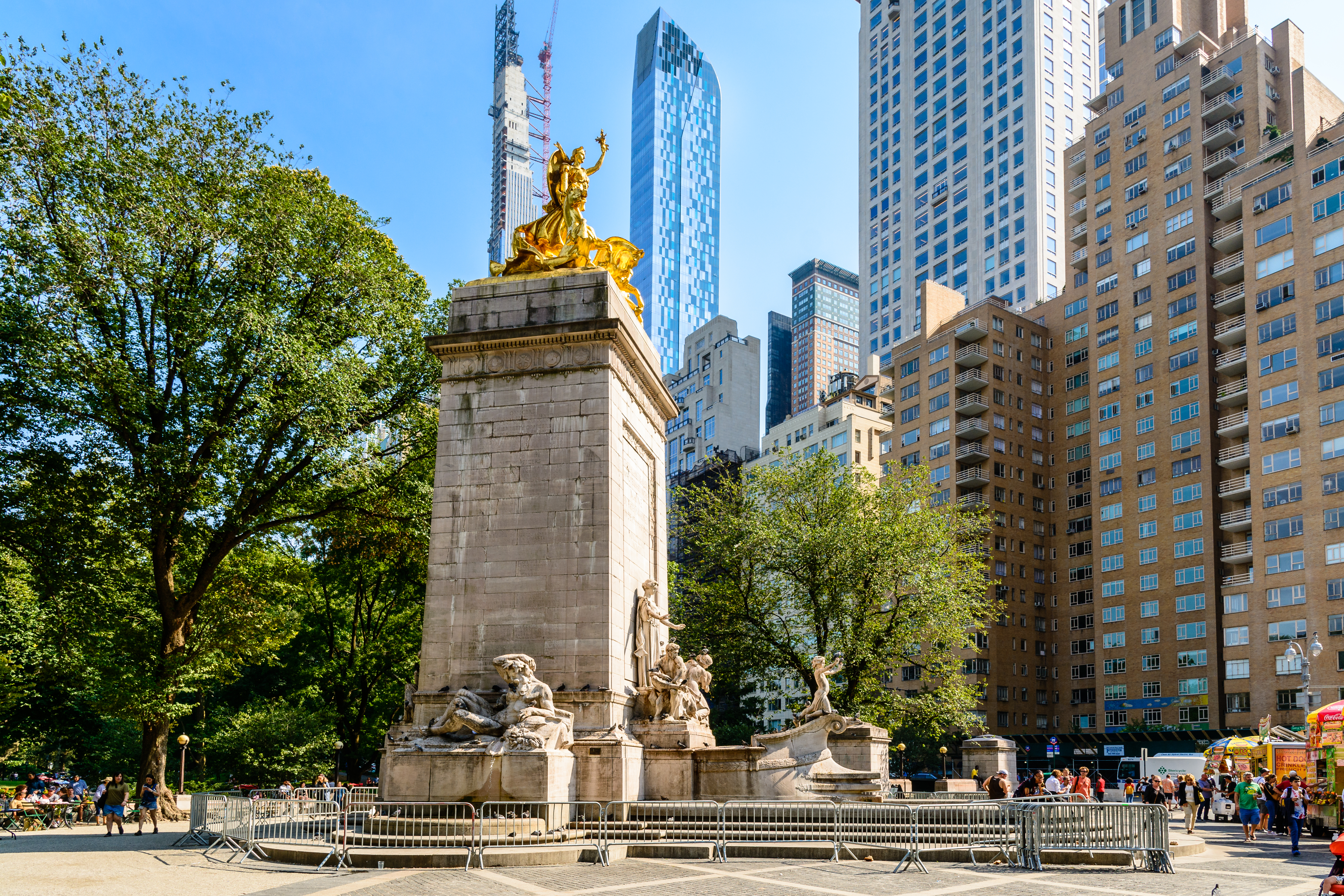
The USS Maine National Monument at the Merchant's Gate entrance to Central Park

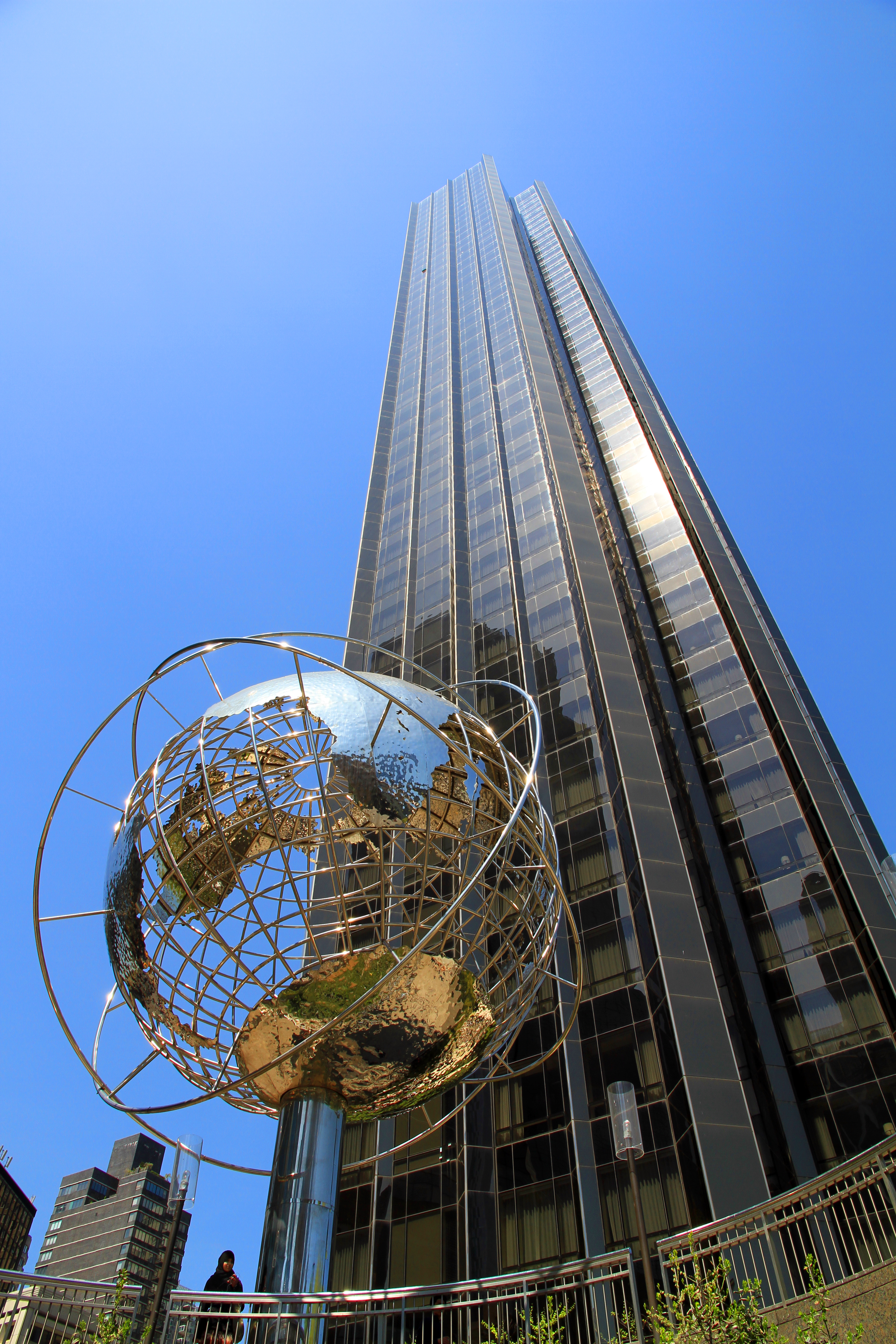
The Trump International Hotel and Tower

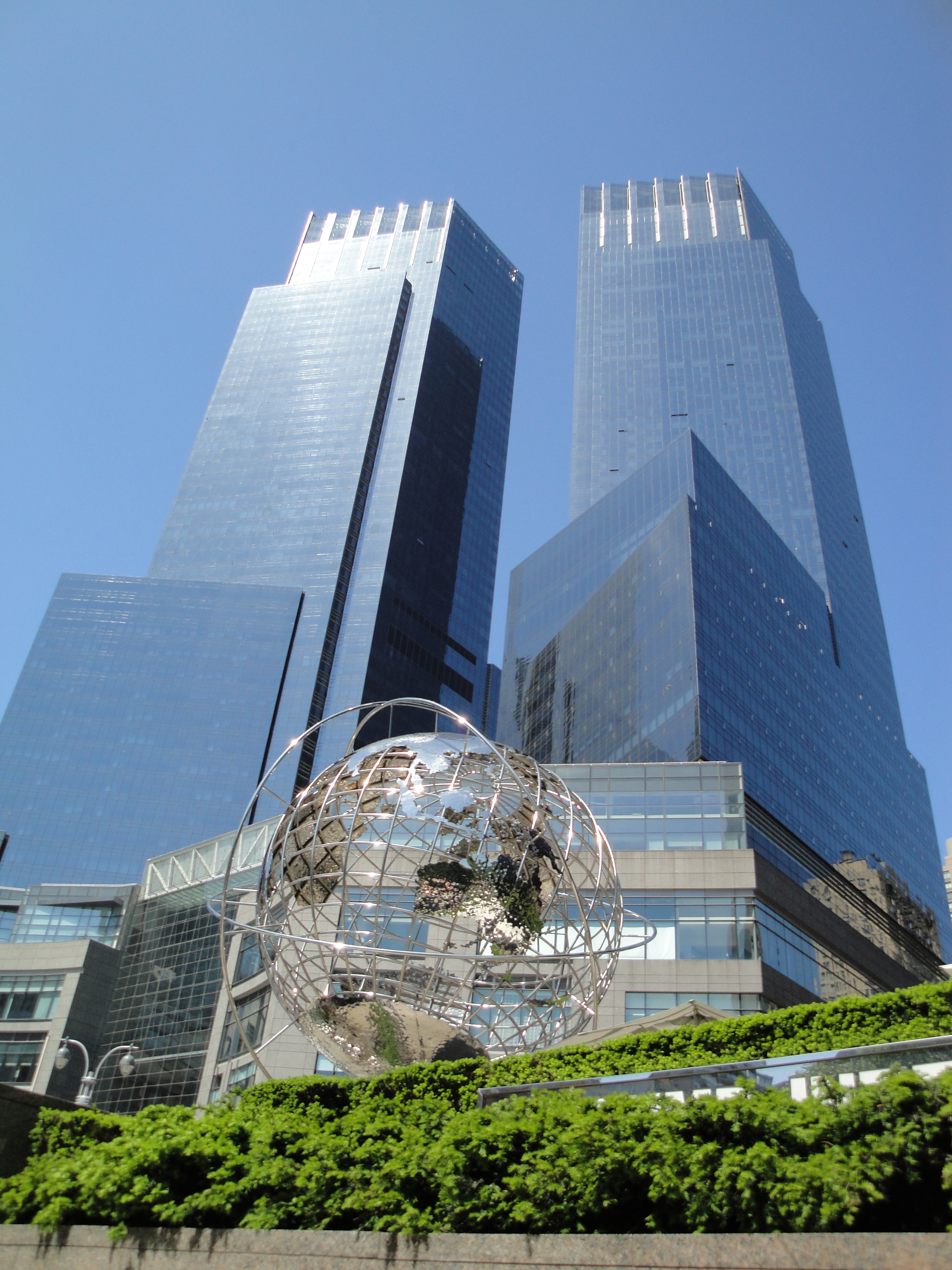
The Deutsche Bank Center, which replaced the New York Coliseum, while it was still known as the Time Warner Center

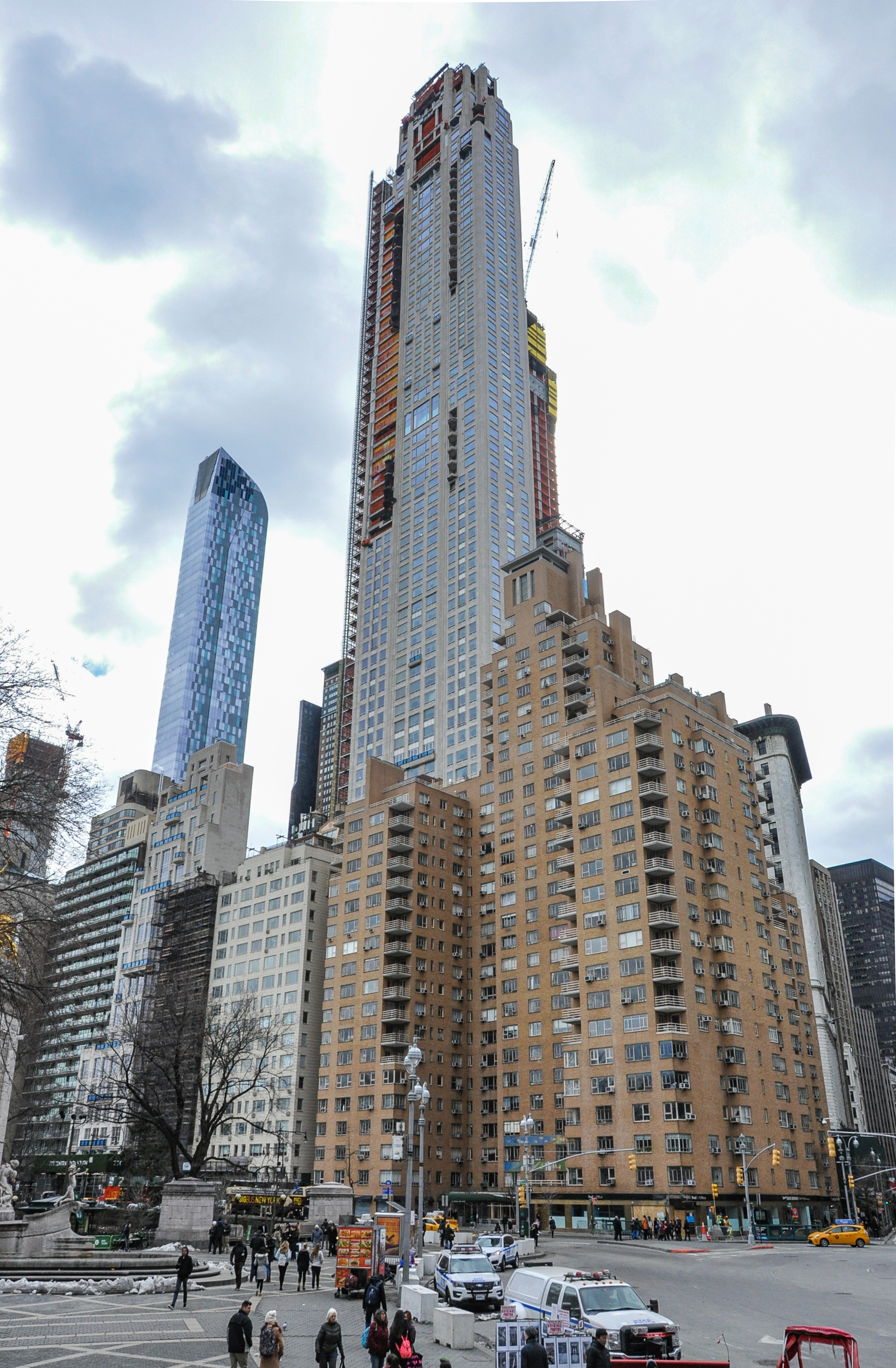
220 Central Park South (2018) rises above 240 Central Park South (1939)
