= Columbus Circle globe =

Sculpture in Manhattan, New York, U.S.

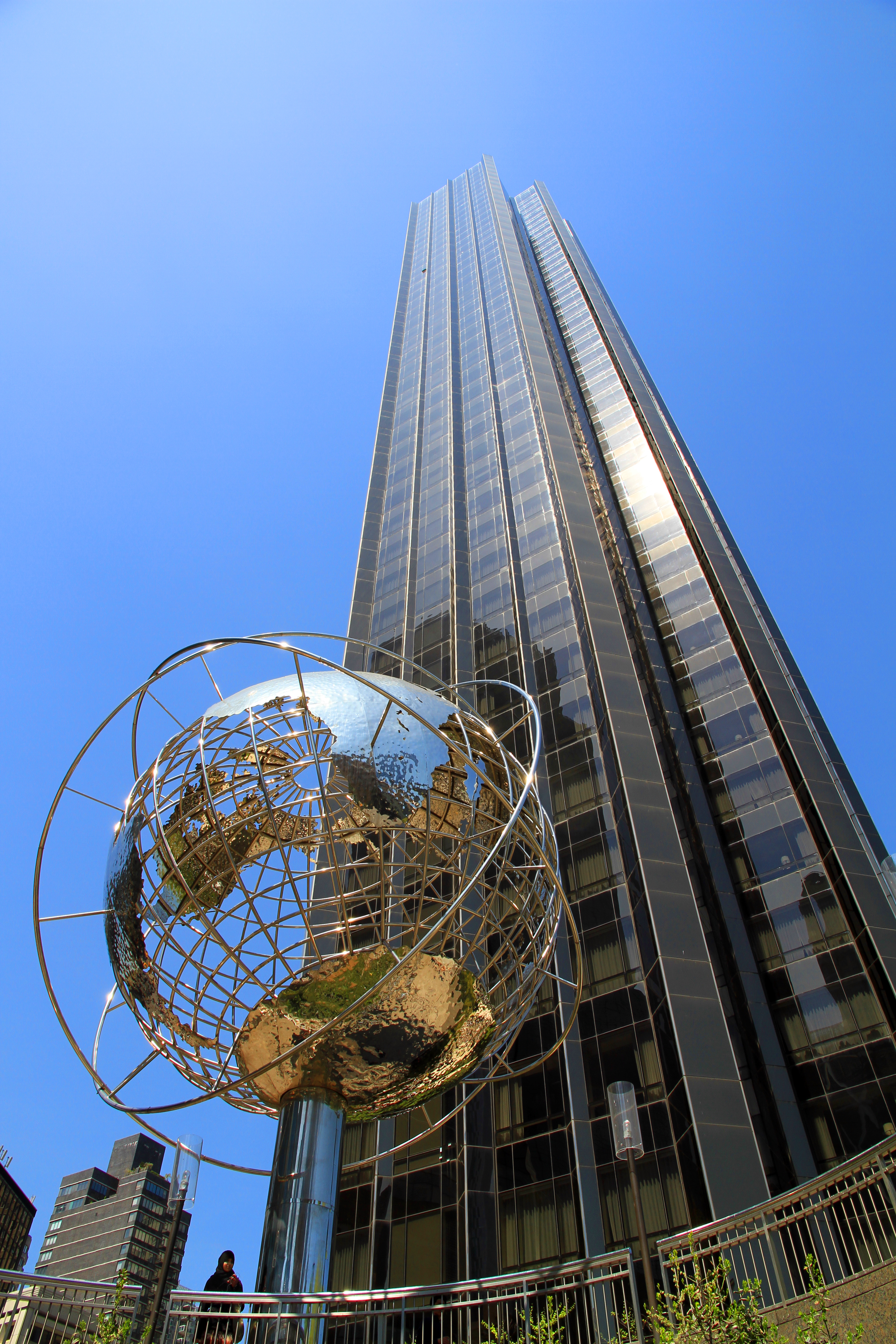
- The sculpture and the Trump International Hotel and Tower in 2013
- Artist: Kim Brandell
- Location: New York City, New York, U.S.; 40.768803°N 73.981728°W

The Columbus Circle globe is a sculpture of a globe by Kim Brandell, installed outside Trump International Hotel and Tower at Columbus Circle in Manhattan, New York City. The globe is a homage to the Unisphere, located in Donald Trump's home borough of Queens. Prior to installation, Brandell held a party for the sculpture at his studios in South Beach, Miami.
