= C-2 visa =

Non-immigrant US visa

The C-2 visa is a non-immigrant visa which allows individuals to travel to the United States for the purpose of immediate and continuous transit to or from the headquarters of the United Nations, or for United Nations officials transiting the US to another foreign nation. The holders of such a visa are considered "geographically restricted nonimmigrants".

== United Nations Headquarters District ==
The travel area for recipients of a C-2 visa is limited to a 25-mile (40 km) radius of Columbus Circle, which is New York City's equivalent of the zero mile marker — the area of this circle is known in the U.S. Code, Title 22 as the "United Nations Headquarters District". The visa is valid for the duration of the individual's stay at the United Nations. This is most relevant for countries that do not have good relations with the United States. The office of the Permanent Representative of Iran to the United Nations commissioned an informal survey with Hagstrom Map determining that the covered area had boundaries at Parsippany, New Jersey, the Connecticut border, and Exit 40 of the Long Island Expressway.
