= Columbus Monument (New York City) =

Monument in Manhattan, New York, U.S.

- U.S. National Register of Historic Places
- New York State Register of Historic Places
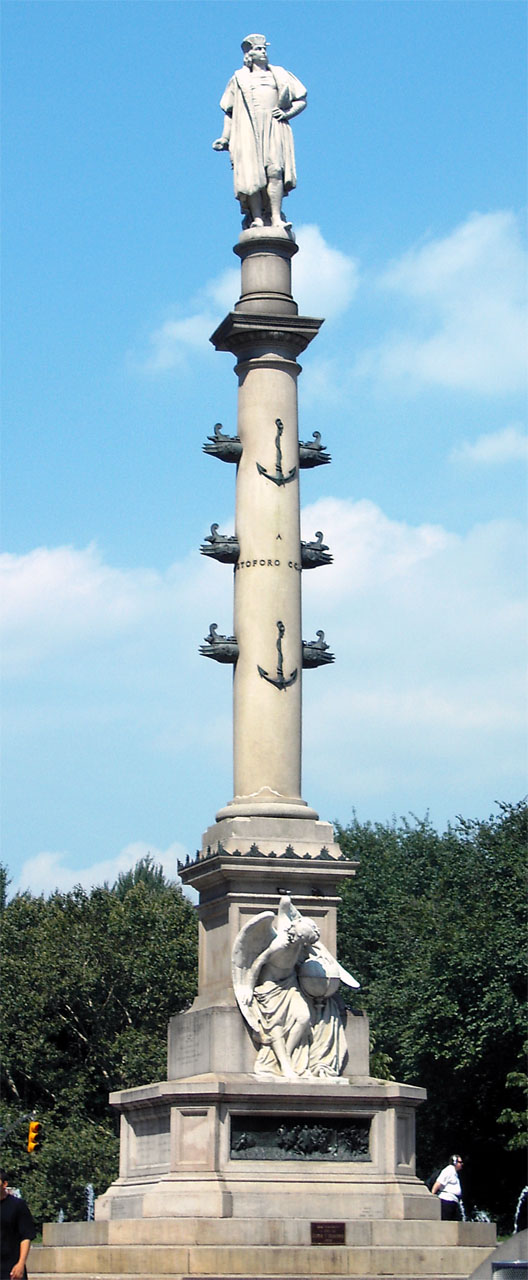
- The monument in 2006
- Location: Columbus Circle, Manhattan, New York, U.S.
- Coordinates: 40°46′05.1″N 73°58′54.8″W
- Built: 1892
- NRHP reference No.: 100003133
- NYSRHP No.: 06101.019547

Significant dates
- Added to NRHP: November 20, 2018
- Designated NYSRHP: September 20, 2018

The Columbus Monument is a 76-foot (23 m) column in the center of Columbus Circle in New York City honoring the Italian explorer Christopher Columbus, who first made an expedition to the New World in 1492. The monument was created by Italian sculptor Gaetano Russo in 1892.

== Description ==
The monument consists of a 14-foot (4.3 m) marble statue of Christopher Columbus atop a 27.5-foot (8.4 m) granite rostral column placed on a four-stepped granite pedestal. The column is decorated with bronze projections representing Columbus' ships: the Niña, the Pinta, and the Santa María; although actually they are depicted as Roman galleys (after the rostral column classical tradition) instead of caravels. Its pedestal features an angel holding a globe.

== History ==
The monument was one of three planned as part of the city's 1892 commemoration of the 400th anniversary of Columbus' landing in the Americas. Originally, the monument was planned to be located in Bowling Green or somewhere else in lower Manhattan. By the time Russo's plan was decided upon in 1890, a commission of Italian businessmen from around the United States had contributed $12,000 of the $20,000 needed to build the statue (equivalent to $430,000 of the $717,000 in cost in current dollars). The statue was constructed with funds raised by Il Progresso, a New York City-based Italian-language newspaper.

Russo created parts of the Columbus Column in his Rome studio and in other workshops in Italy; the bronze elements were cast in the Nelli Foundry. The completed column was shipped to the United States in September 1892 to be placed within the "circle at Fifty-ninth Street and Eighth Avenue". Once the statue arrived in Manhattan, it was quickly transported to the circle. The monument was officially unveiled with a ceremony on October 12, 1892, as part of the 400th anniversary celebration.

Less than a decade later, when the original IRT subway construction commenced in 1901, one of the first stations structurally completed was the IRT Broadway–Seventh Avenue Line's 59th Street station, despite special engineering support that was required to protect the monument.

During the construction of the New York City Subway's Eighth Avenue Line (A, B, C, and D trains) underneath the circle in the late 1920s and early 1930s, the Columbus statue was shored up with temporary supports. Even so, the statue was shifted two inches north from its original position, and the top of the statue tilted 1.5 inches (3.8 cm). As a result, the statue was repaired and cleaned in 1934. The monument received some retouching in 1992 to commemorate the 500th anniversary of Columbus's voyage, and in turn, the monument's own 100th anniversary. It was also rededicated in that same year.

In 2012, the statue was used as the centerpiece of an interactive art installation by Tatzu Nishi entitled Discovering Columbus. The Public Art Fund described the project as follows:

Nishi’s project re-imagines the colossal 13-foot-tall statue of Columbus standing in a fully furnished, modern living room. Featuring tables, chairs, couch, rug, and flat-screen television, the décor reflects the artist’s interpretation of contemporary New York style. He even designed wallpaper inspired by memories of American popular culture, having watched Hollywood movies and television as a child in Japan. Discovering Columbus offers both a unique perspective on a historical monument and a surreal experience of the sculpture in a new context. Allowing us to take a journey up six flights of stairs to a fictional living room, Tatzu Nishi invites us to discover for ourselves where the imagination may lead.

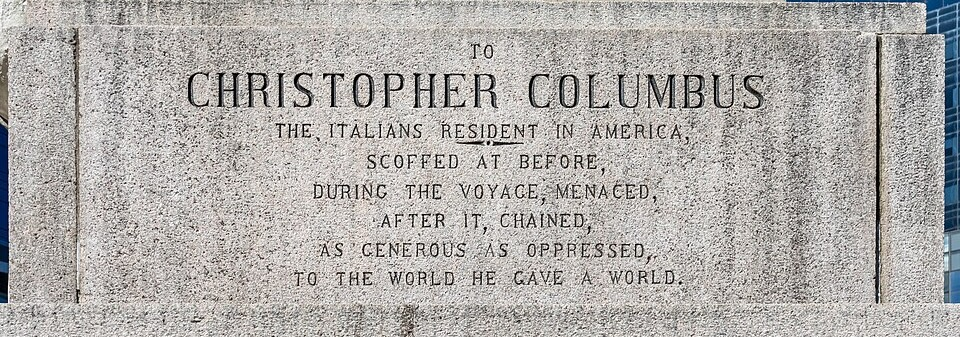
Plaque inscription: To Christopher Columbus The Italians resident in America, Scoffed at before, During the voyage, menaced, After it, chained, As generous as oppressed, To the world, he gave a world.

The monument became the subject of attention during the 2017 monument controversies in the United States. In August of that year, Mayor Bill de Blasio commissioned a 90-day review of potentially "hateful" monuments across the city to determine if any of them, including the Columbus Monument, warranted either removal or recontextualization (e.g., by explanatory plaques). Those critical of Columbus called for the monument to be removed. The Columbus Citizens Foundation and many Italian Americans in New York opposed removal. After two instances of vandalism in September 2017, including one incident where the Central Park Columbus monument was defaced with red paint, full-time security measures were implemented ahead of the Columbus Day parade.

On September 20, 2018, in a unanimous decision, the New York State Board of Historic Preservation voted to place the monument on the state historic register and nominate it to the National Register of Historic Places (NRHP), due to its significance. Two months later, the National Park Service inscribed the monument on the NRHP.

On September 19, 2023, Italian Prime Minister Giorgia Meloni visited the monument and, during a ceremony, laid a wreath in honor of Columbus.

== See also ==
- List of monuments and memorials to Christopher Columbus
- National Register of Historic Places listings in Manhattan from 14th to 59th Streets
- Italians in New York City
- Italian Americans
