= 116th Street station (IND Eighth Avenue Line) =

New York City Subway station in Manhattan

116 Street
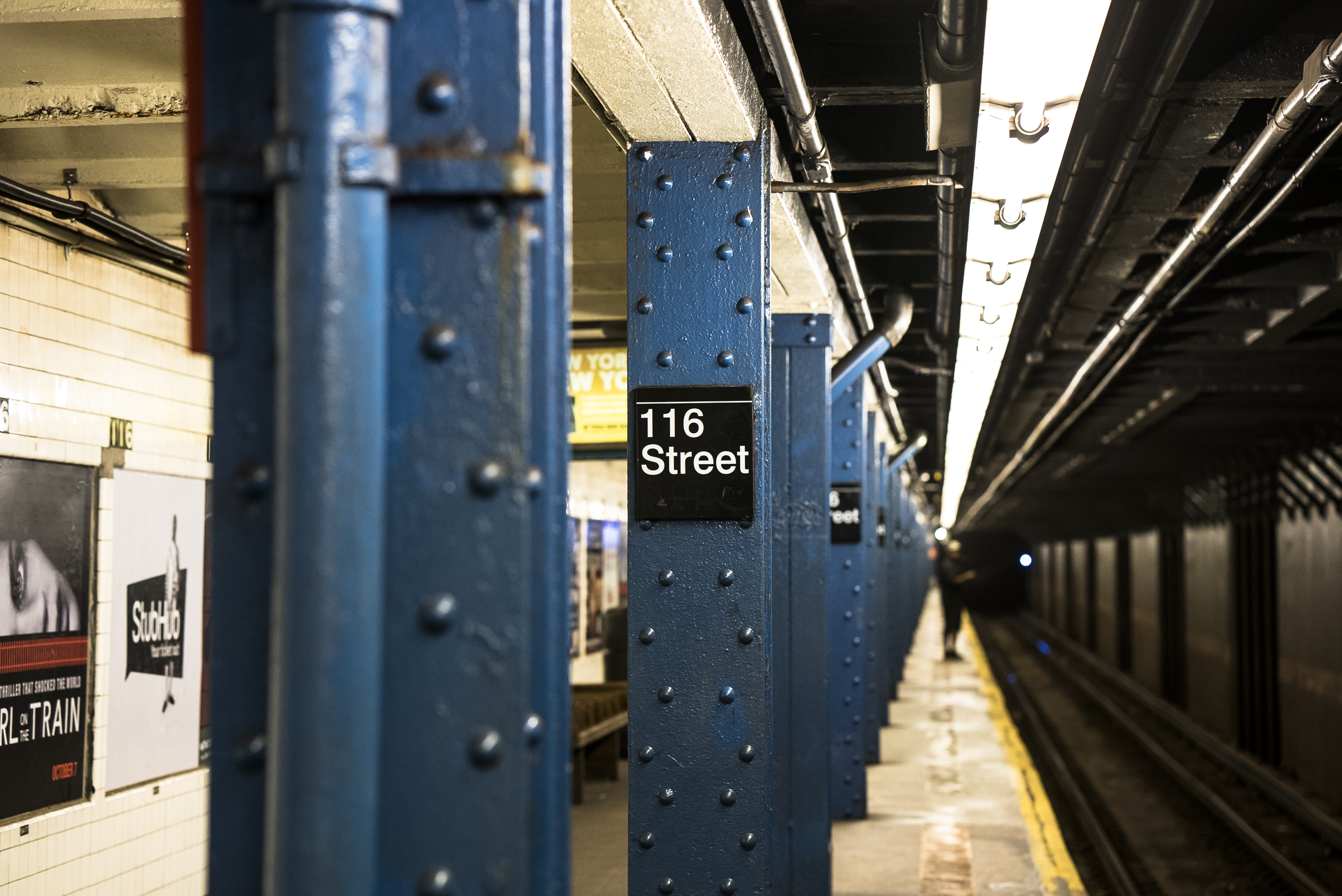
- Platform view

Station statistics
- Address: West 116th Street & Frederick Douglass Boulevard; New York, New York
- Borough: Manhattan
- Locale: Harlem
- Coordinates: 40.804389°N 73.955412°W
- Division: B (IND)
- Line: IND Eighth Avenue Line
- Services: A (late nights); B (weekdays during the day); C (all except late nights)
- Transit: NYCT Bus: M7, M10, M116
- Structure: Underground
- Platforms: 2 side platforms
- Tracks: 4

Other information
- Opened: September 10, 1932 (94 years ago)
- Accessible: No; planned

Traffic
- 2025: 1,517,442 ▲4.8%
- Rank: 227 out of 423
Services
Preceding station	New York City Subway	Following station
125th Street A B C via 145th Street	Local	Cathedral Parkway–110th Street A B C via 59th Street–Columbus Circle
does not stop here
Location
Location within New York City Subway
Location within New York City
Location within New York
Track layout
Street map
Station service legend
Symbol	Description
Stops all times except late nights	Stops all times except late nights
Stops late nights only	Stops late nights only
Stops weekdays during the day	Stops weekdays during the day

The 116th Street station is a local station on the IND Eighth Avenue Line of the New York City Subway. Located at the intersection of 116th Street and 8th Avenue in Harlem, Manhattan, it is served by the B train on weekdays and by the C train at all times except late nights, when the A train takes over service.

== History ==
The station opened on September 10, 1932, as part of the city-operated Independent Subway System (IND)'s initial segment, the Eighth Avenue Line between Chambers Street and 207th Street. Construction of the whole line cost $191.2 million (equivalent to $4,511.9 million in 2025. While the IRT Broadway–Seventh Avenue Line already provided parallel service, the new Eighth Avenue subway via Central Park West and Frederick Douglass Boulevard provided an alternative route.

The station was planned to be rehabilitated as part of the 2015–2019 Metropolitan Transportation Authority Capital Program. As part of its 2025–2029 Capital Program, the MTA has proposed making the station wheelchair-accessible in compliance with the Americans with Disabilities Act of 1990.

== Station layout ==
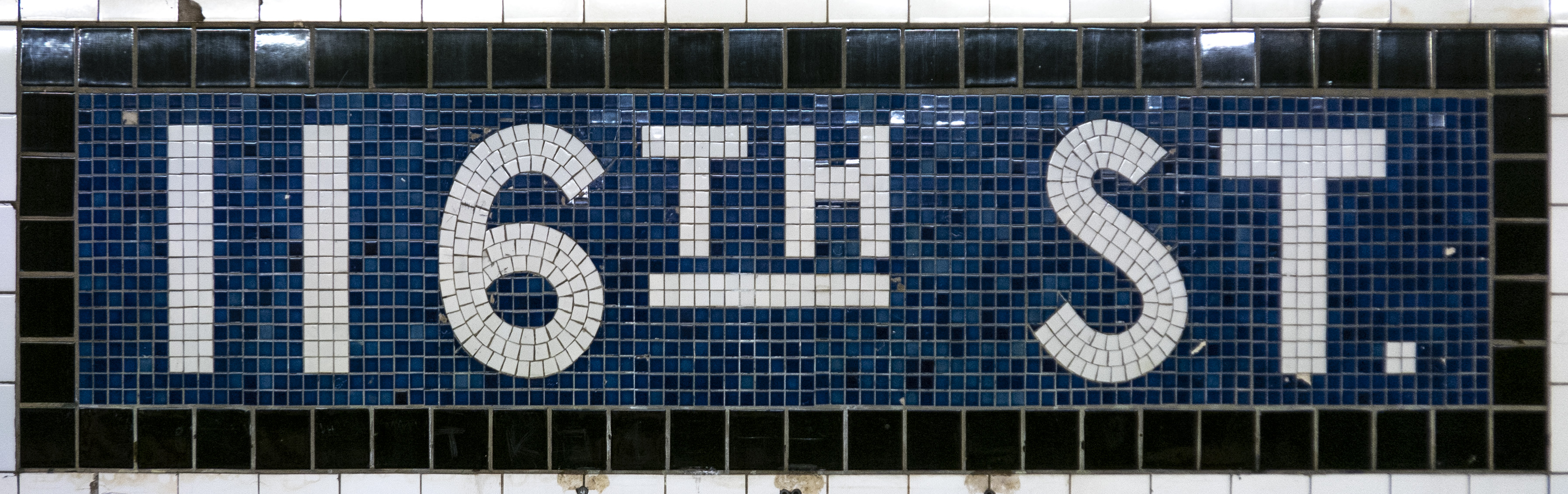
Mosaic name tablet

This underground station has four tracks and two side platforms. The platforms have name tablets reading "116TH ST." in white sans-serif lettering on a midnight blue background and black border, but no trim line. Small direction and name signs reading "116" in white lettering on a black border run at regular intervals. There are blue I-beam columns that run along both platforms at regular intervals with every other one having the standard black station name plate in white lettering.

Each platform has one same-level fare control area at their extreme south ends. Each one has a turnstile bank and two staircases to the street. The southbound platform has a token booth while the northbound platform does not, having been closed in 2010 and removed several years later.

There are no crossovers or crossunders between the two platforms. As a result, this station and 135th Street are the only two stations on the Eighth Avenue Line north of 59th Street that do not permit free transfers between opposite directions.

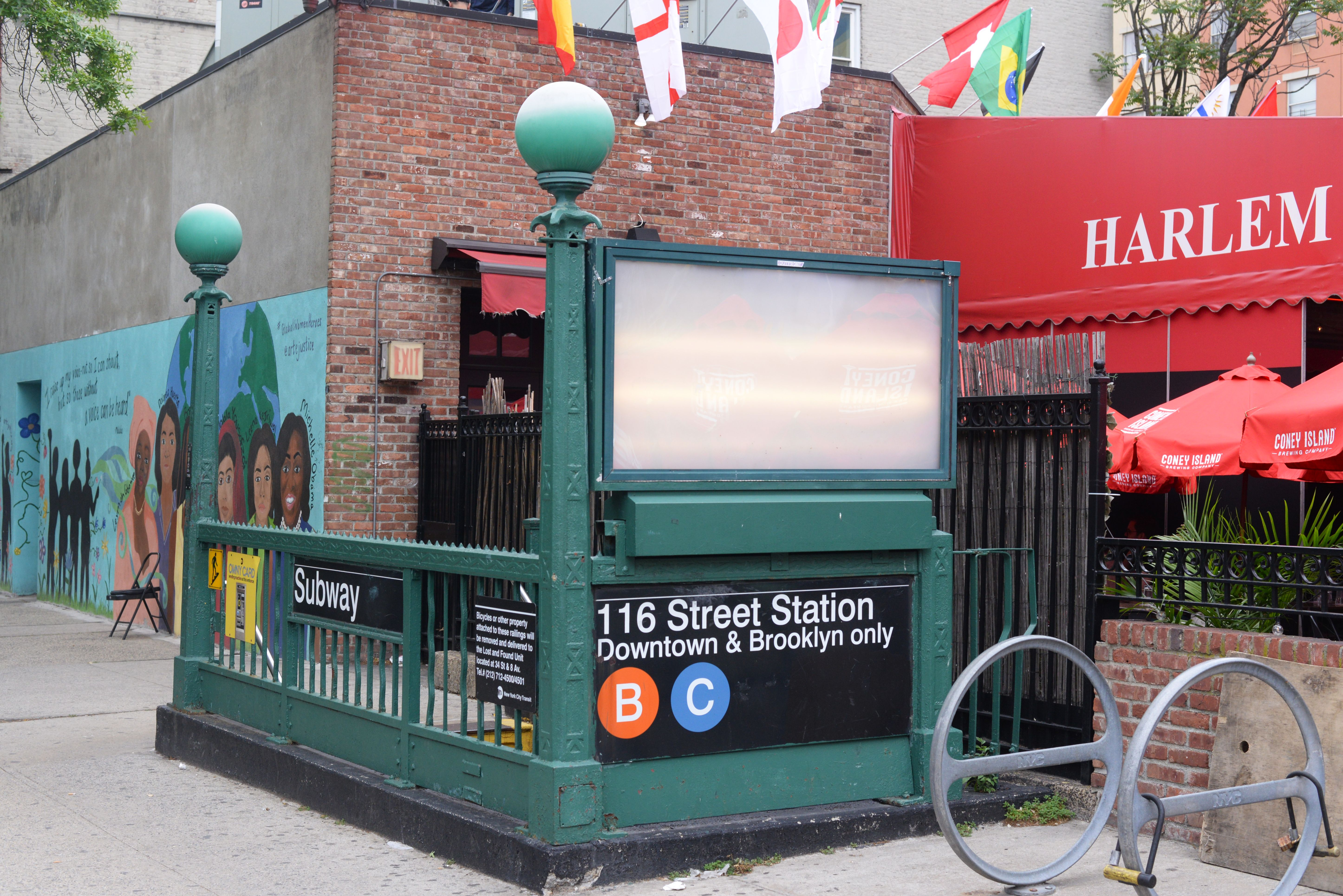
Street stair

=== Exits ===
The exits on the northbound platform go up to either eastern corners of 116th Street and Frederick Douglass Boulevard while the exits on the southbound platform go up to either western corners.

Both platforms also had a part-time entrance/exit at the north end to both northern corners of 118th Street and Frederick Douglass Boulevard, with the northbound platform's entrance/exit leading to the northeastern corner and the southbound platform's entrance/exit leading to the northwestern corner.

== Nearby points of interest ==
- East Campus at Columbia University
- Morningside Park
