= St. Nicholas Park =

Public park in Manhattan, New York

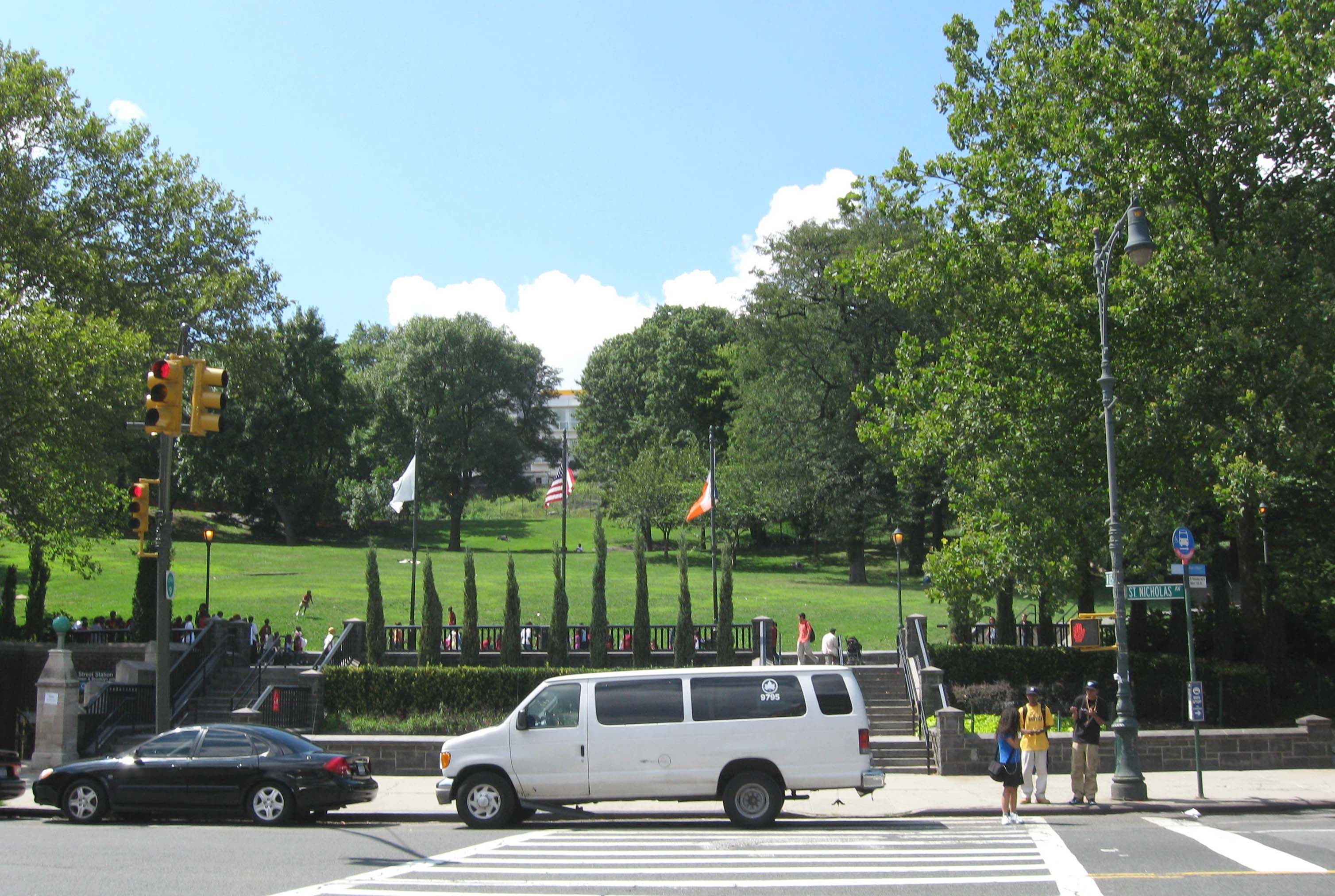
- 135th Street entrance
- Interactive map of St. Nicholas Park
- Coordinates: 40°49′02″N 73°56′56″W
- Created: 1895
- Public transit: Subway: to 135th Street, to 125th Street or 145th Street; Bus: M3, M10, M60 SBS, M100, M101, M104, Bx15, Bx19, Bx33

St. Nicholas Park is a public park in Manhattan, New York City, between the neighborhoods of Harlem, Hamilton Heights and Manhattanville. The nearly 23-acre (93,000 m^{2}) park is contained by 141st Street to the north, 128th Street to the south, St. Nicholas Terrace to the west, and St. Nicholas Avenue to the east.

== History ==
In 1895, the first land for the park was acquired upon the condemnation of land for the Croton Aqueduct. After additional property was acquired, construction on the park began in 1906. Like the streets on its eastern and western borders, the park was named after Saint Nicholas, the patron saint of Amsterdam whose likeness adorned one of the ships that brought the first Dutch settlers to New Amsterdam. Parks Commissioner Samuel Parsons designed the park himself. The park next expanded in 1909, when the park's southern boundary was extended to 128th Street. In 1931, a playground opened along 129th Street. A new playground was erected on this site in 1965.

== Features ==
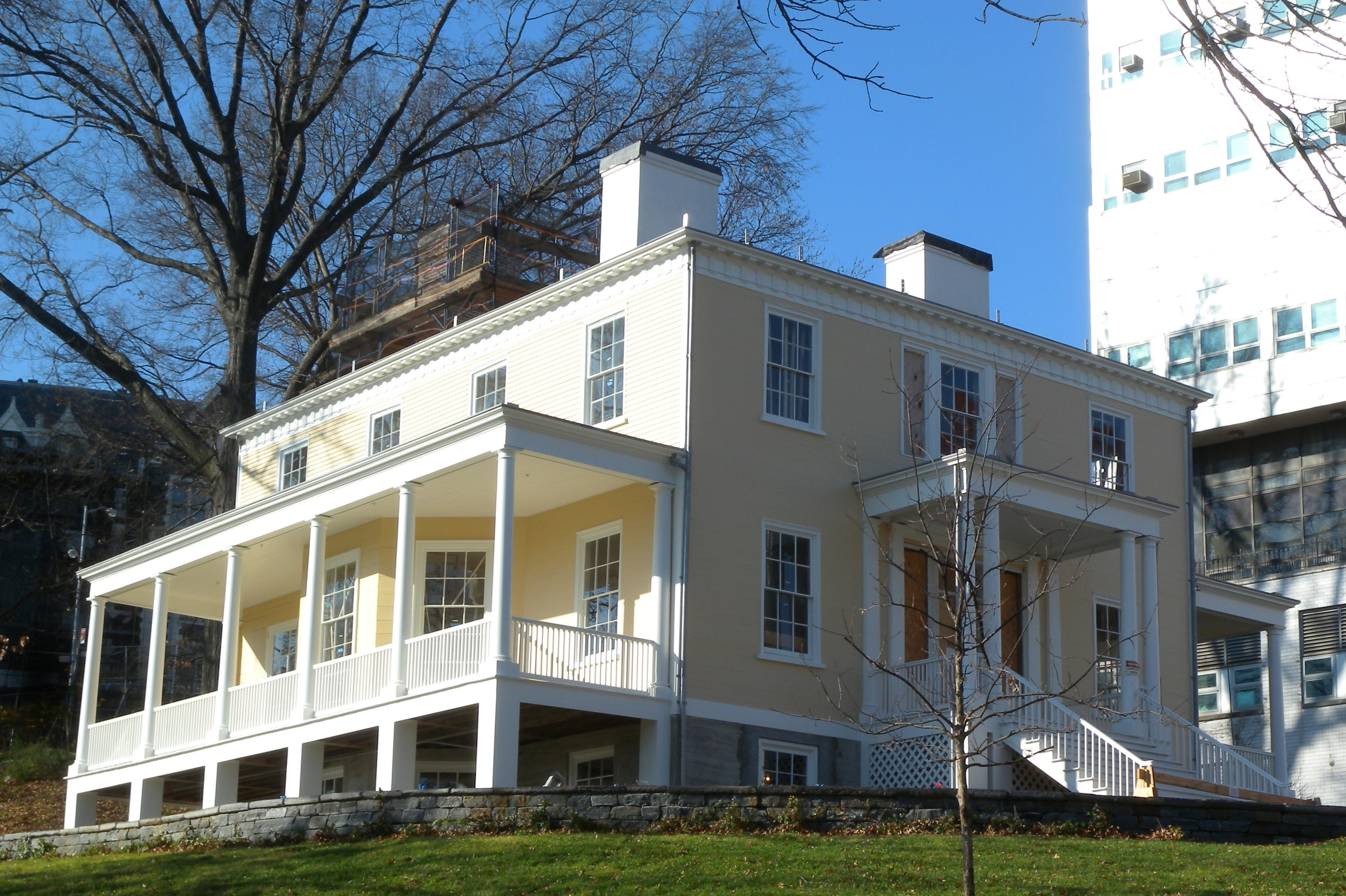
The Grange in St. Nicholas Park

St. Nicholas Park contains Alexander Hamilton's historic home, The Grange. Now designated as the Hamilton Grange National Memorial, it was moved 500 feet (150 m) in 2008 from Convent Avenue to the north side of St. Nicholas Park, facing 141st Street. The Grange was considered a "country home" when it was built in 1802, and its new location is within the boundaries of Hamilton's original 32-acre (130,000 m^{2}) estate.

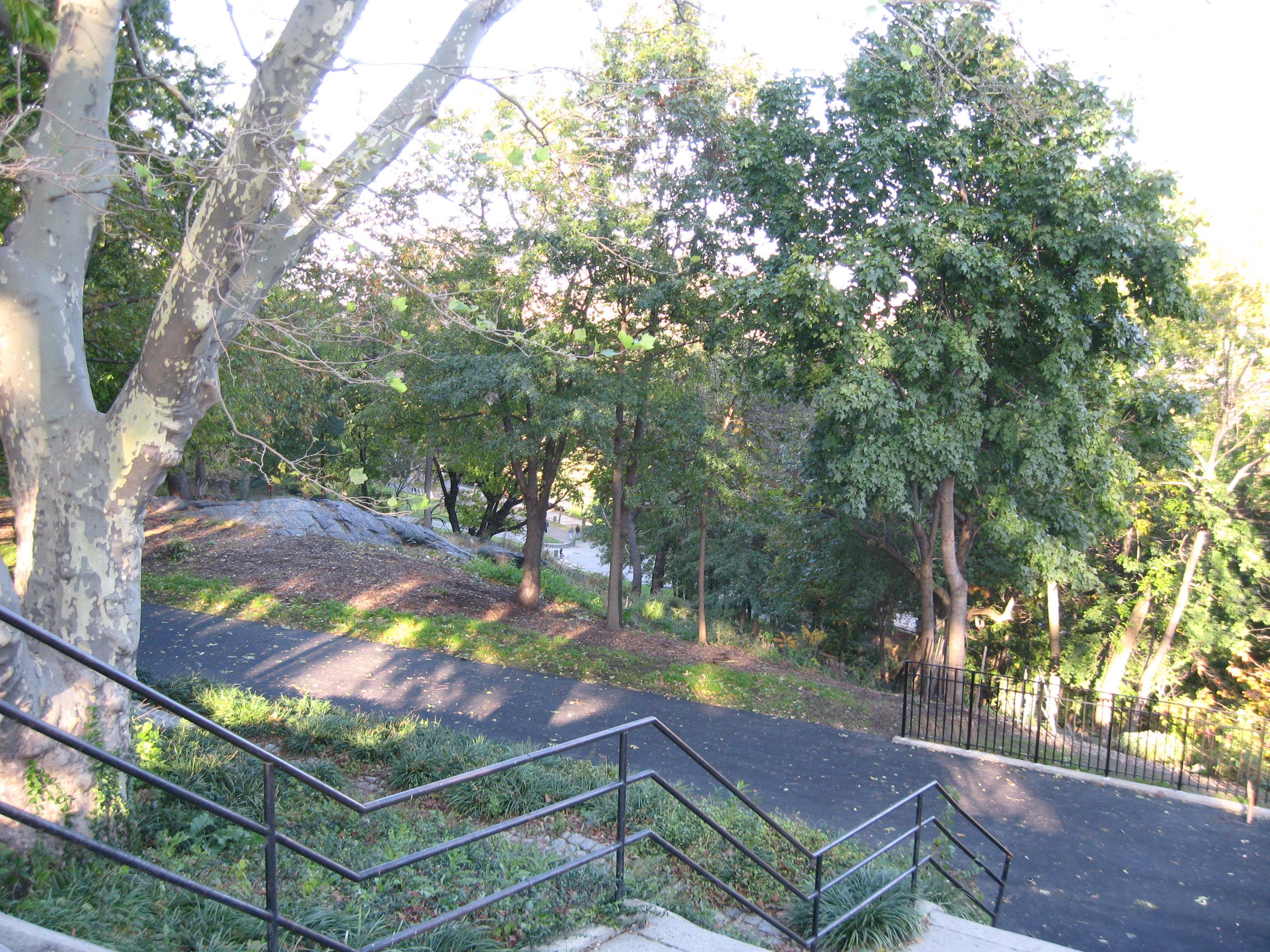
View from St. Nicholas Terrace

Much of City College of New York's campus, including Shepard Hall, is just across St. Nicholas Terrace. The wooded park features basketball courts, playgrounds, handball courts, a dog park, and barbecue areas maintained by NYC Parks. Other attractions include large Manhattan schist outcrops, and monarch butterflies that cover the butterfly bushes at migration time.

== Transportation ==
The park can be reached via the New York City Subway's IND Eighth Avenue Line at the 125th Street (A, B, C, and D trains), 135th Street (B and C trains), or 145th Street (A, B, C, and D trains) stations.

== In popular culture ==
The park is the setting for a scene from the 2014 independent film The Mend, starring Josh Lucas.

== See also ==
- List of New York City parks

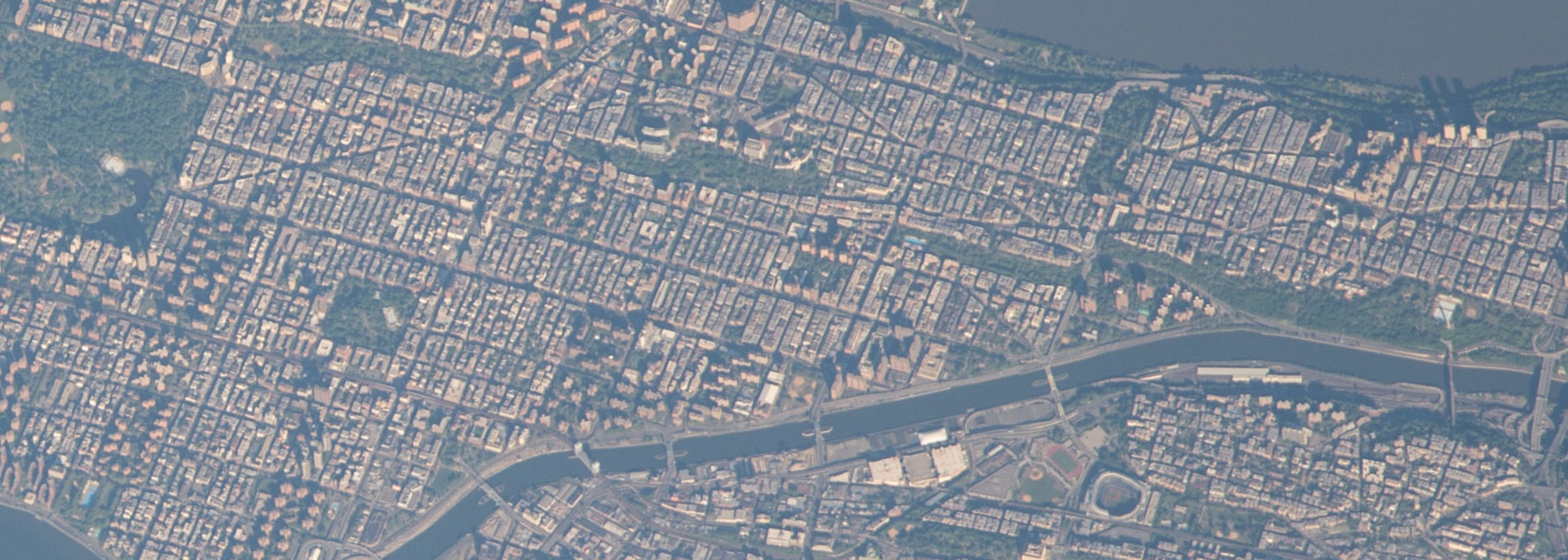
Central Park - Morningside Park - St. Nicholas Park - Jackie Robinson Park - Highbridge Park - Harlem River
