= 135th Street station (IND Eighth Avenue Line) =

New York City Subway station in Manhattan

135 Street
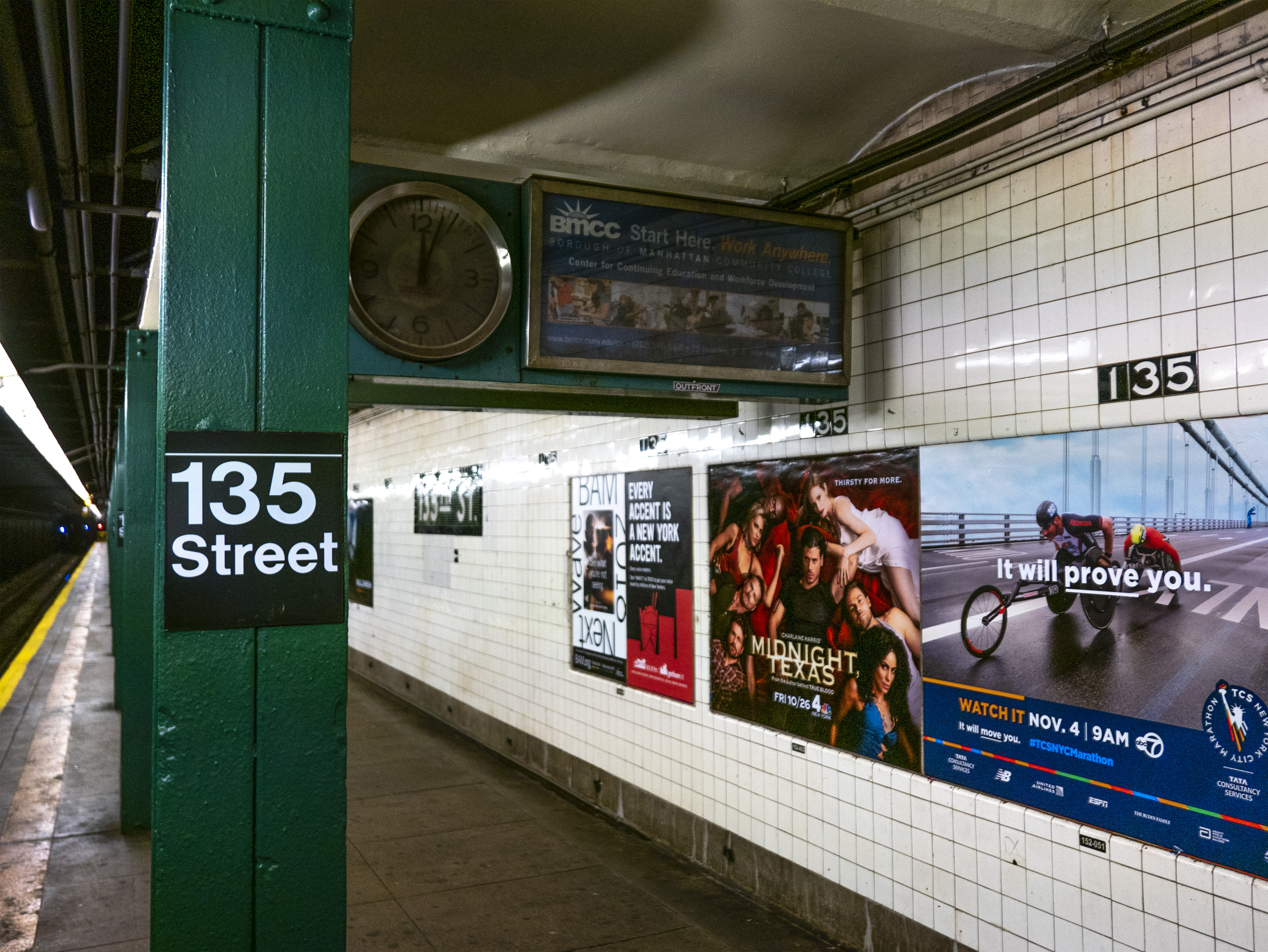
- Northbound platform

Station statistics
- Address: West 135th Street & Saint Nicholas Avenue; New York, New York
- Borough: Manhattan
- Locale: Harlem, Hamilton Heights
- Coordinates: 40.81709°N 73.94803°W
- Division: B (IND)
- Line: IND Eighth Avenue Line
- Services: A (late nights); B (weekdays during the day); C (all except late nights)
- Transit: NYCT Bus: M3, Bx33
- Structure: Underground
- Platforms: 2 side platforms
- Tracks: 6 (4 in passenger service)

Other information
- Opened: September 10, 1932 (94 years ago)
- Accessibility: Same-platform transfer available

Traffic
- 2025: 1,212,560 ▲5.5%
- Rank: 273 out of 423
Services
Preceding station	New York City Subway	Following station
145th Street A B C services split	Local	125th Street A B C via 59th Street–Columbus Circle
does not stop here
Location
Location within New York City Subway
Location within New York City
Location within New York
Track layout
Street map
Station service legend
Symbol	Description
Stops all times except late nights	Stops all times except late nights
Stops late nights only	Stops late nights only
Stops weekdays during the day	Stops weekdays during the day

The 135th Street station is a local station on the IND Eighth Avenue Line of the New York City Subway. Located at the intersection of 135th Street and St. Nicholas Avenue in Harlem and Hamilton Heights in Manhattan, it is served by the B train on weekdays and by the C train at all times except late nights, when the A train takes over service.

== History ==
The station opened on September 10, 1932, as part of the city-operated Independent Subway System (IND)'s initial segment, the Eighth Avenue Line between Chambers Street and 207th Street. Construction of the whole line cost $191.2 million (equivalent to $4,511.9 million in 2025.) While the IRT Broadway–Seventh Avenue Line already provided parallel service, the new Eighth Avenue subway via Central Park West and Frederick Douglass Boulevard provided an alternative route.

On July 3, 1997, a Queens-bound A train derailed just north of the station as it was traversing a switch. 15 passengers were injured in the incident.

== Station layout ==
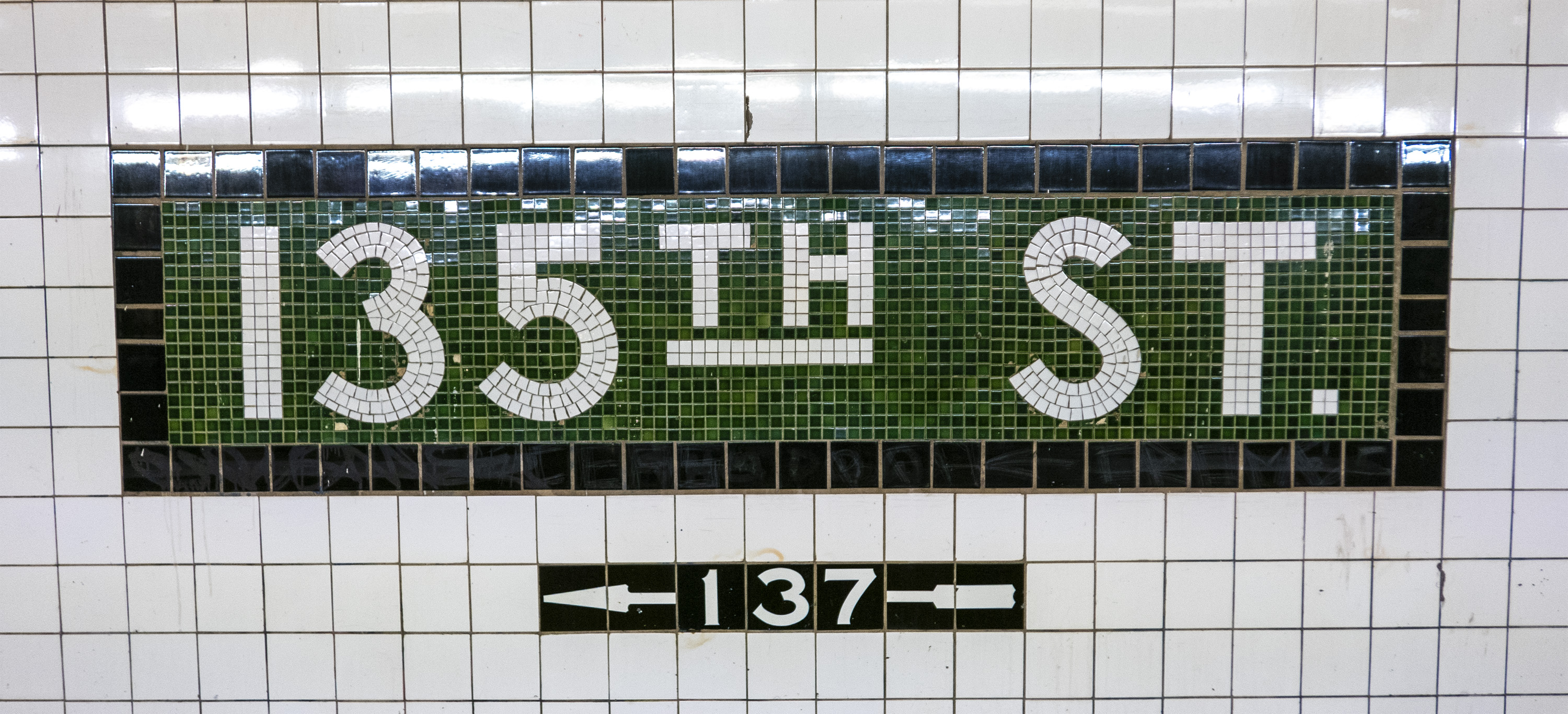
Mosaic name tablet

There is no trim line at this station, but there are mosaic name tablets reading "135TH ST." in white sans-serif lettering on a Prussian green background and black border. Small tile captions reading "135" run along the wall at regular intervals between the name tablets, and under the name tablets are directional captions, all in white lettering on a black background. Hunter green I-beam columns run along the platforms at regular intervals, alternating ones having the standard black station name plate with white lettering.

This station is the only local station with six tracks between two side platforms and is one of only three stations in the entire subway system that features six tracks on the same level, within the same tunnel (the others are DeKalb Avenue and Hoyt–Schermerhorn Streets, both in Downtown Brooklyn). The two outermost tracks are used by local trains stopping at this station, while the two innermost tracks are used by express trains. The middle tracks in each direction are lay-up tracks and not used in revenue service. All fare controls are at platform level and there are no mezzanines, crossovers, or crossunders.

This station is located nearby the City College of New York.

=== Exits ===
The full-time booths are at the 135th Street end. The booth at the 137th Street exit has been removed, and the 137th Street exits used to be part-time only. There were restrooms at the 137th Street end of the southbound platform. Both street staircases at this end were built with their entry points facing St. Nicholas Park.

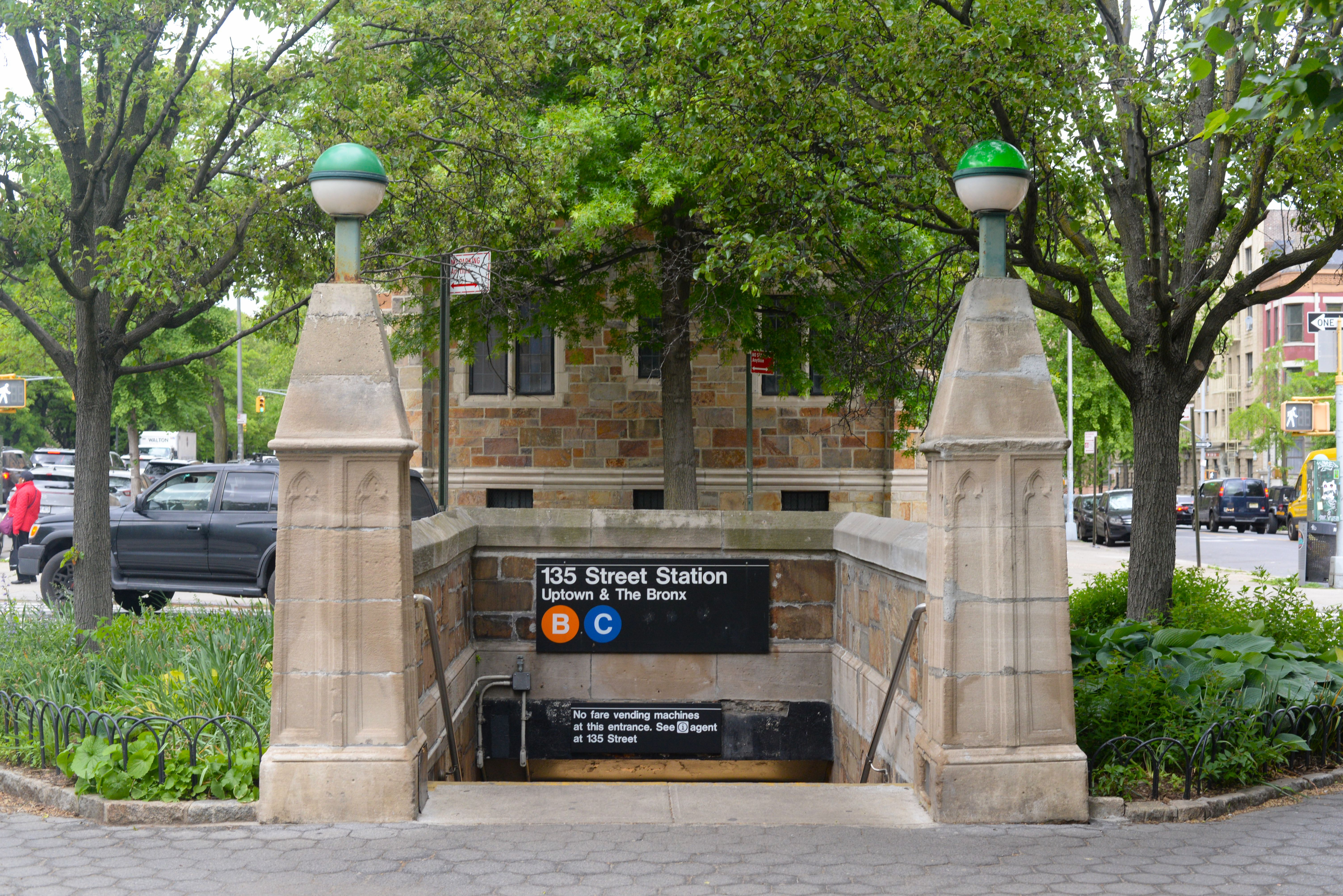
Stone entrance to the station

From the southern end of the station, there is a staircase on the west side of St. Nicholas Avenue at West 135th Street to the southbound platform, within St. Nicholas Park, a staircase from the northeastern corner of St. Nicholas Avenue and West 135th Street to the northbound platform, and two staircases to the northbound platform from the southeastern corner of St. Nicholas Avenue and West 135th Street. At the northern end of the station, there is a staircase leading to the southbound platform from the western side of St. Nicholas Avenue at West 137th Street, within St. Nicholas Park, and an exit-only staircase from the northbound platform leading to the southeastern corner of St. Nicholas Avenue and West 137th Street. This exit features an array of stone casting in a Cathedral-like setting, originally built in 1932.
