= 125th Street station (IND Eighth Avenue Line) =

New York City Subway station in Manhattan

125 Street
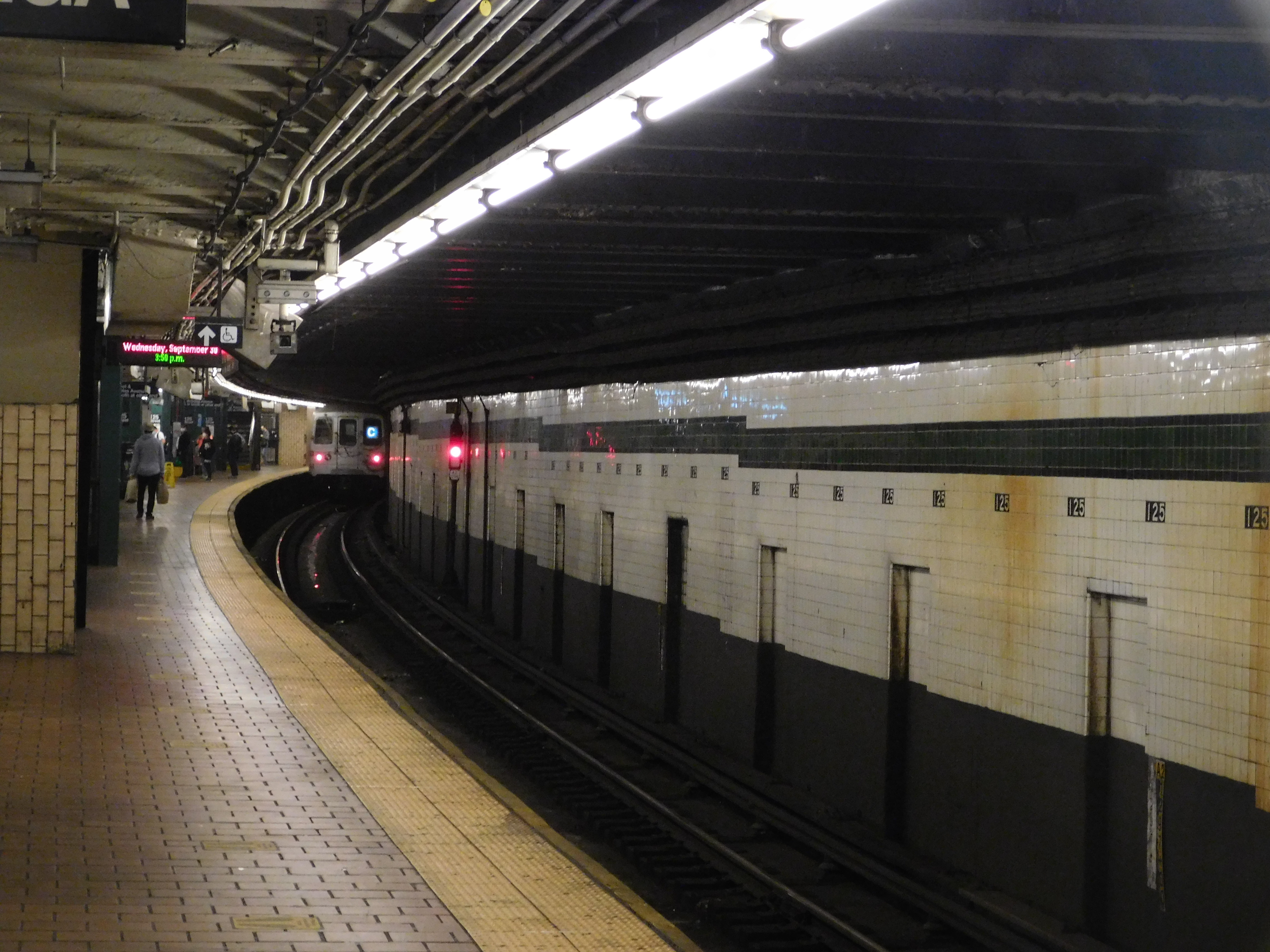
- Northbound local track with departing C train

Station statistics
- Address: West 125th Street & Saint Nicholas Avenue; New York, New York
- Borough: Manhattan
- Locale: Harlem
- Coordinates: 40.810756°N 73.952665°W
- Division: B (IND)
- Line: IND Eighth Avenue Line
- Services: A (all times); B (weekdays during the day); C (all except late nights); D (all times)
- Transit: NYCT Bus: M3, M10, M60 SBS, M100, M101, M125
- Structure: Underground
- Platforms: 2 island platforms cross-platform interchange
- Tracks: 4

Other information
- Opened: September 10, 1932 (94 years ago)
- Accessible: Yes

Traffic
- 2025: 6,171,780 ▲5.7%
- Rank: 45 out of 423
Services
Preceding station	New York City Subway	Following station
145th Street A D services split	Express	59th Street–Columbus Circle A D services split
135th Street A B C via 145th Street	Local	116th Street A B C via 59th Street–Columbus Circle
Location
Location within New York City Subway
Location within New York City
Location within New York
Track layout
Street map
Station service legend
Symbol	Description
Stops all times except late nights	Stops all times except late nights
Stops all times	Stops all times
Stops late nights only	Stops late nights only
Stops rush hours only	Stops rush hours only
Stops rush hours in the peak direction only	Stops rush hours in the peak direction only
Stops weekdays during the day	Stops weekdays during the day

The 125th Street station is an express station on the IND Eighth Avenue Line of the New York City Subway. Located at the intersection of 125th Street and St. Nicholas Avenue in the Harlem neighborhood of Manhattan, it is served by the A and D trains at all times, by the C train except at night, and by the B train only on weekdays during the day.

Nearby landmarks and points of interest include the Apollo Theater and the Touro College of Osteopathic Medicine.

== History ==
The station opened on September 10, 1932, as part of the city-operated Independent Subway System (IND)'s initial segment, the Eighth Avenue Line between Chambers Street and 207th Street. Construction of the whole line cost $191.2 million (equivalent to $4,511.9 million in 2025. While the IRT Broadway–Seventh Avenue Line already provided parallel service, the new Eighth Avenue subway via Central Park West and Frederick Douglass Boulevard provided an alternative route.

In 1981, the MTA listed the station among the 69 most deteriorated stations in the subway system. The station was renovated in the 1980s, during which two stairs to each platform at the north end were removed and the platforms' original white floor tiling was replaced. The station was damaged in a water main break in 1989. Another renovation later restored the closed staircases and made the station ADA-accessible with the installation of elevators near the middle of the platforms.

On June 27, 2017, a southbound A train derailed just north of the station. This derailment, caused by improperly secured replacement rails, left 34 passengers injured.

In January 2026, Governor Kathy Hochul announced that she would request funding to extend the Second Avenue Subway along 125th Street. Although Phase 2 of the line's construction was initially planned to extend only to 125th Street and Lexington Avenue, Hochul's proposal called for additional connections to existing stations at Lenox Avenue, St. Nicholas Avenue, and Broadway.

== Station layout ==
The 125th Street station is a standard express station with four tracks and two island platforms, allowing cross-platform interchanges between local and express trains. The A and D both stop here at all times; the C stops here except at night and the B stops here only on weekdays during the day. B and C trains always run local and D trains always run express. A trains run express during the day and local during the night. The next stop to the north is 135th Street for local trains and 145th Street for express trains; the next stop to the south is 116th Street for local trains and 59th Street–Columbus Circle for express trains. 59th Street–Columbus Circle is 3.35 miles (5.391 km) away with seven local stations in between, which is the longest distance between two express stops in the system.

The outer track wall tiles have a Prussian green trim line with a black border and small "125" signs in white lettering on a black background beneath it. The green tiles are part of a color-coded tile system used throughout the IND. The tile colors were designed to facilitate navigation for travelers going away from Lower Manhattan. As such, the green tiles used at the 125th Street station are also used at 135th Street, the local station to the north; the next express station, 145th Street, uses a different tile color. Both platforms have one line of green I-beam columns that run at regular intervals for their entire length except for a small section at either ends. Alternating columns have the standard black station name plate in white lettering.

The station has a mezzanine above the tracks at the Southern end and platforms that connect both fare control areas at either ends. There are five staircases to each platform and large-scale photos of Harlem in the 1920s and 1930s.

=== Exits ===
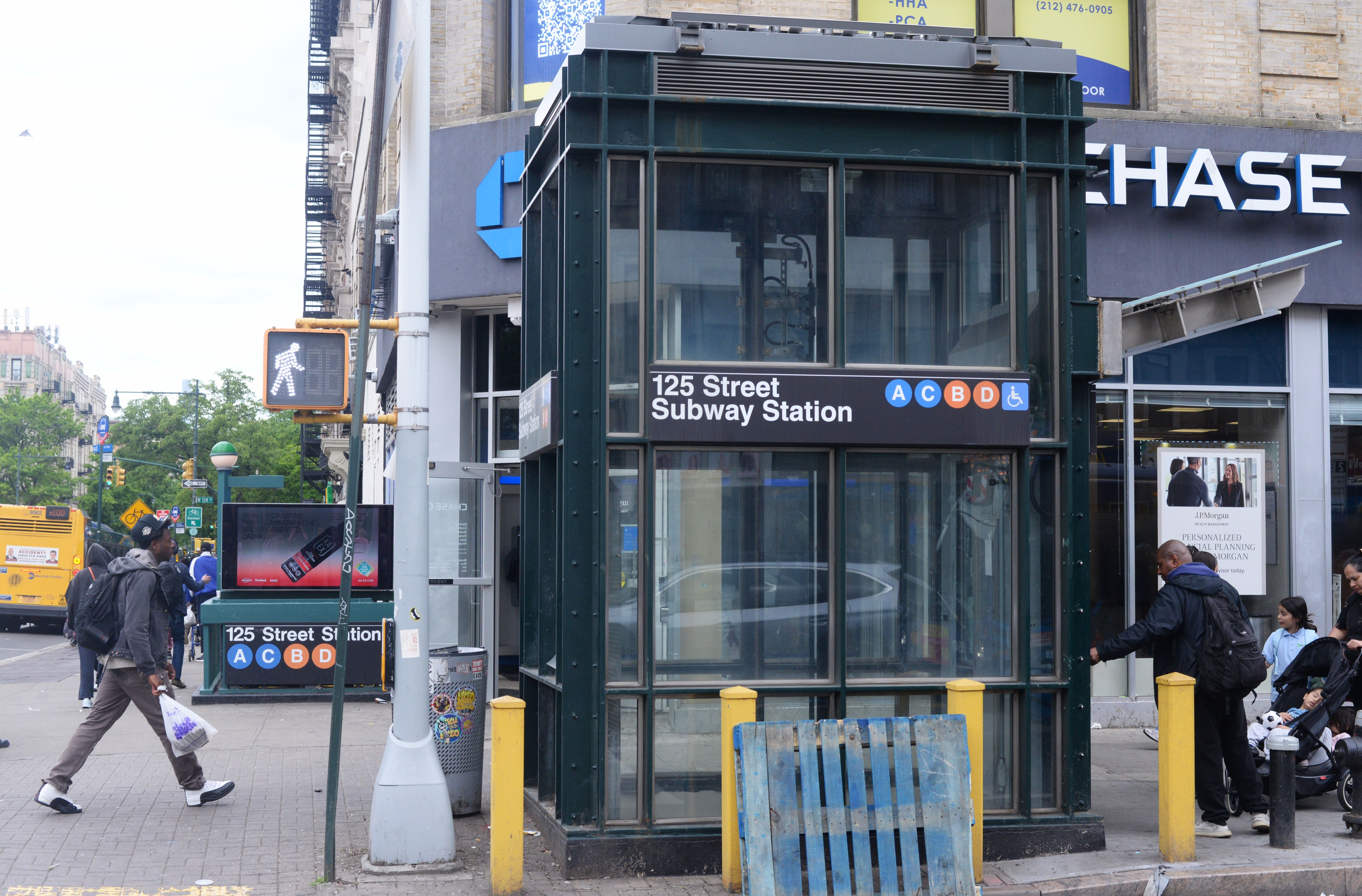
Elevator and staircase

The full-time fare control area is at the south end of the mezzanine, serving the 125th Street exits, and has a turnstile bank and token booth. It serves the exits at St. Nicholas Avenue and West 125th Street. The other fare control area at the north end, serving the 127th Street exits, is unstaffed, containing full height turnstiles. There is also evidence of closed exit stairs going up to 126th Street and 124th Street, one on each side of both mezzanines. One of the staircases led directly into the basement of a business that existed at street level.

- One stair, NW corner of St. Nicholas Avenue and West 125th Street
- One stair, NE corner of St. Nicholas Avenue and West 125th Street
- One stair and one elevator, SW corner of St. Nicholas Avenue and West 125th Street
- One stair, SE corner of St. Nicholas Avenue and West 125th Street
- One stair, SW corner of St. Nicholas Avenue and West 127th Street
- One stair, SE corner of St. Nicholas Avenue and West 127th Street
