= 59th Street–Columbus Circle station =

New York City Subway station in Manhattan

59 Street–Columbus Circle
- New York City Subway station complex
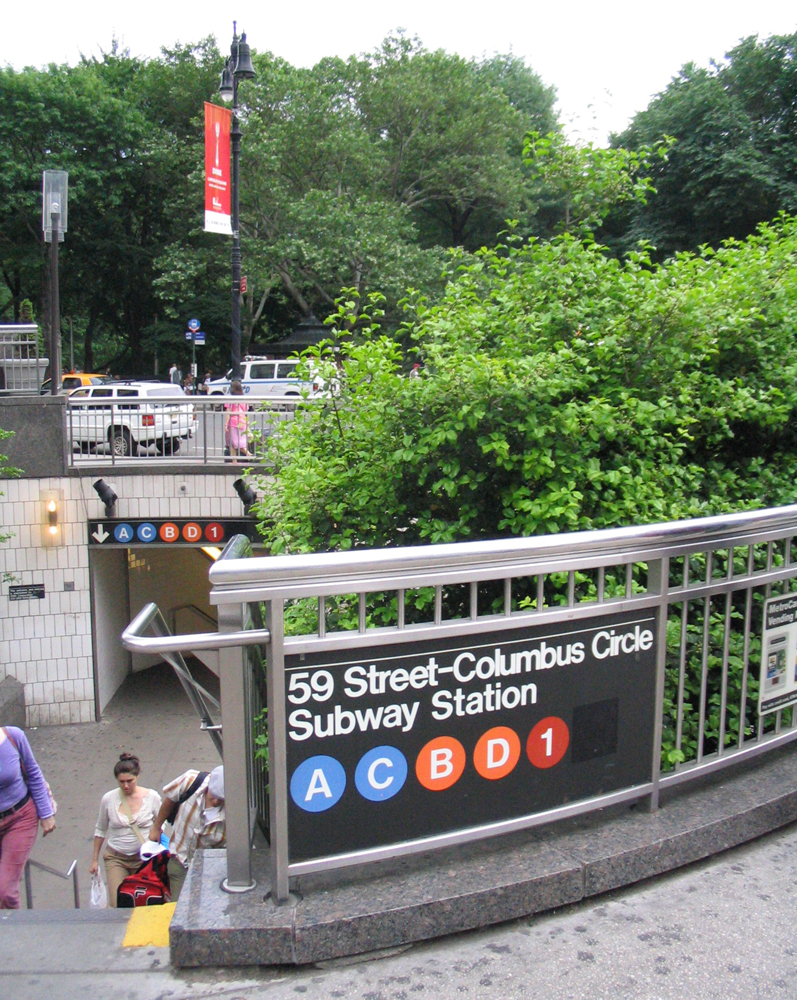
- Station entrance north of Columbus Circle

Station statistics
- Address: Intersection of West 59th Street, Eighth Avenue & Broadway; New York, New York
- Borough: Manhattan
- Locale: Columbus Circle, Midtown Manhattan
- Coordinates: 40°46′05″N 73°58′55″W
- Division: A (IRT), B (IND)
- Line: IND Eighth Avenue Line; IRT Broadway–Seventh Avenue Line
- Services: 1 (all times); 2 (late nights); A (all times); B (weekdays during the day); C (all except late nights); D (all times)
- Transit: NYCT Bus: M5, M7, M10, M12, M20, M104; MTA Bus: BxM2
- Levels: 2

Other information
- Opened: IRT station: October 27, 1904; 122 years ago IND station: September 10, 1932; 94 years ago Transfer: July 1, 1948; 78 years ago
- Accessible: Yes

Traffic
- 2025: 17,215,905 ▲2.1%
- Rank: 8 out of 423
Location
Location within New York City Subway
Location within New York City
Location within New York
Street map
Station service legend
Symbol	Description
Stops all times except late nights	Stops all times except late nights
Stops all times	Stops all times
Stops late nights only	Stops late nights only
Stops weekdays during the day	Stops weekdays during the day

The 59th Street–Columbus Circle station is a New York City Subway station complex shared by the IRT Broadway–Seventh Avenue Line and the IND Eighth Avenue Line. It is located at Columbus Circle in Manhattan, where 59th Street, Broadway and Eighth Avenue intersect, and serves Central Park, the Upper West Side, Hell's Kitchen, and Midtown Manhattan. The station is served by the 1, A, and D trains at all times; the C train except at night; the B train only on weekdays during the day; and the 2 train during late nights.

The Broadway–Seventh Avenue Line station was built for the Interborough Rapid Transit Company (IRT) and was a local station on the city's first subway line, which was approved in 1900. The station opened on October 27, 1904, as one of the original 28 stations of the New York City Subway. The Eighth Avenue Line station was built as an express station for the Independent Subway System (IND) and opened on September 10, 1932, as part of the IND's first segment. The complex was renovated in the 2000s, following unsuccessful attempts to raise money for such a restoration during the late 20th century.

The IRT station has two side platforms and four tracks; express trains use the inner two tracks to bypass the station. The IND station has three island platforms and four tracks, but only two of the platforms are in use. The transfer between the IRT platforms and the IND platforms has been within fare control since July 1, 1948. The station complex contains elevators, which make it compliant with the Americans with Disabilities Act of 1990. There is also a New York City Police Department (NYPD) transit precinct at the station. The original portion of the IRT station's interior is a New York City designated landmark and listed on the National Register of Historic Places. As of 2019, the station is the eighth-busiest in the system.

== History ==
=== Original IRT subway ===
==== Construction and opening ====
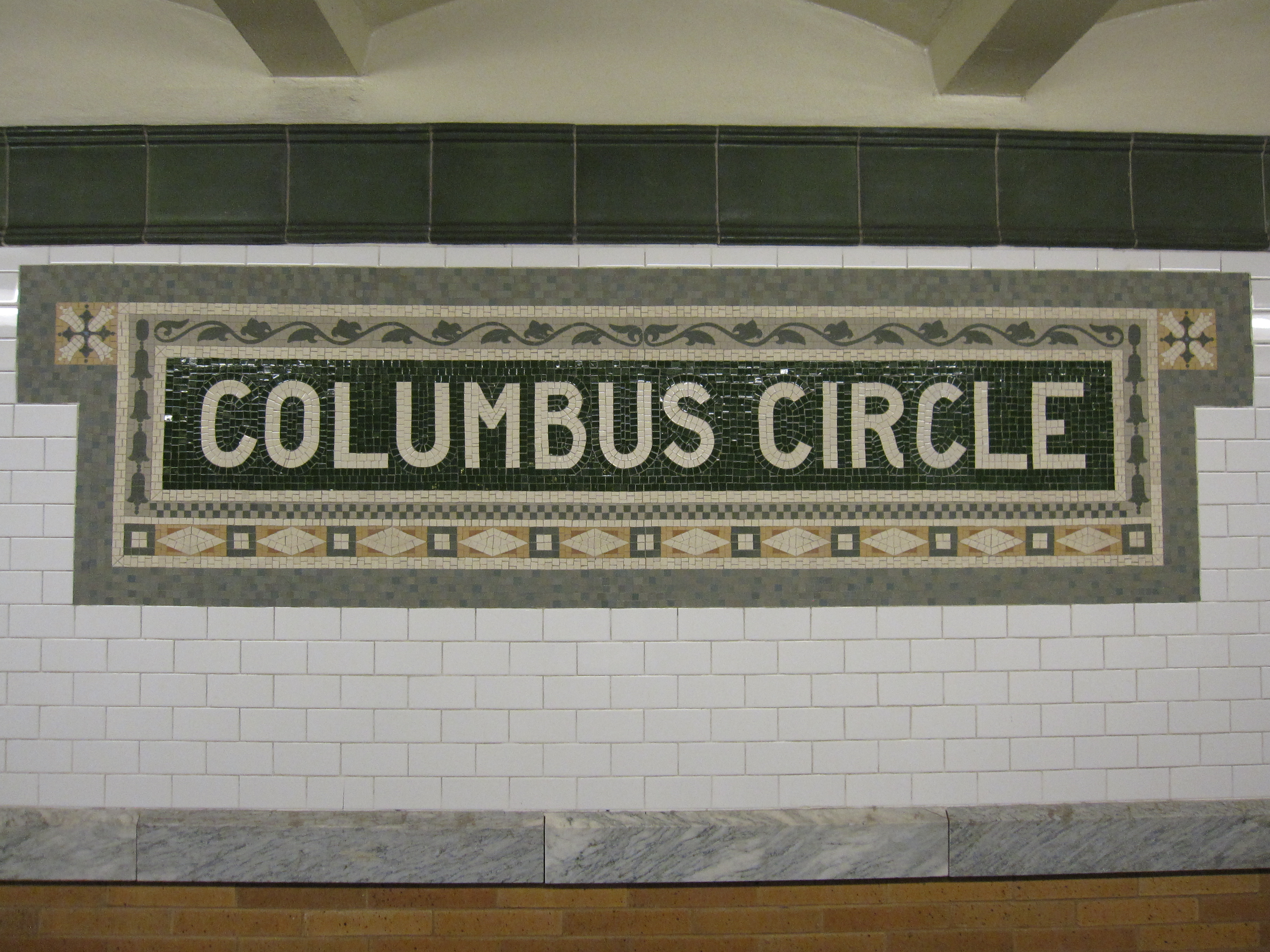
IRT station's name in mosaics

Planning for a subway line in New York City dates to 1864, but development of what became the city's first subway line did not start until 1894, when the New York State Legislature passed the Rapid Transit Act. The subway plans were drawn up by a team of engineers led by William Barclay Parsons, the Rapid Transit Commission's chief engineer. It called for a subway line from New York City Hall in lower Manhattan to the Upper West Side, where two branches would lead north into the Bronx. A plan was formally adopted in 1897, and all legal conflicts over the route alignment were resolved near the end of 1899. The Rapid Transit Construction Company, organized by John B. McDonald and funded by August Belmont Jr., signed the initial Contract 1 with the Rapid Transit Commission in February 1900, under which it would construct the subway and maintain a 50-year operating lease from the opening of the line. In 1901, the firm of Heins & LaFarge was hired to design the underground stations. Belmont incorporated the Interborough Rapid Transit Company (IRT) in April 1902 to operate the subway.

The 59th Street station was constructed as part of the IRT's West Side Line (now the Broadway–Seventh Avenue Line) from 60th Street to 82nd Street, for which work had begun on August 22, 1900. These sections had been awarded to William Bradley. The section of tunnel near Columbus Circle had been completed by late 1901. At the time, the uptown platform was planned to be named 60th Street, while the downtown platform was to be named 59th Street. On March 14, 1903, the 59th Street station hosted a ceremony in which mayor Seth Low drove the first spike for the IRT subway's first track. By late 1903, the subway was nearly complete, but the IRT Powerhouse and the system's electrical substations were still under construction, delaying the system's opening.

The 59th Street station opened on October 27, 1904, as one of the original 28 stations of the New York City Subway from City Hall to 145th Street on the West Side Branch. The opening of the first subway line, and particularly the 59th Street station, helped contribute to the development of Columbus Circle and the Upper West Side.

==== Operation ====
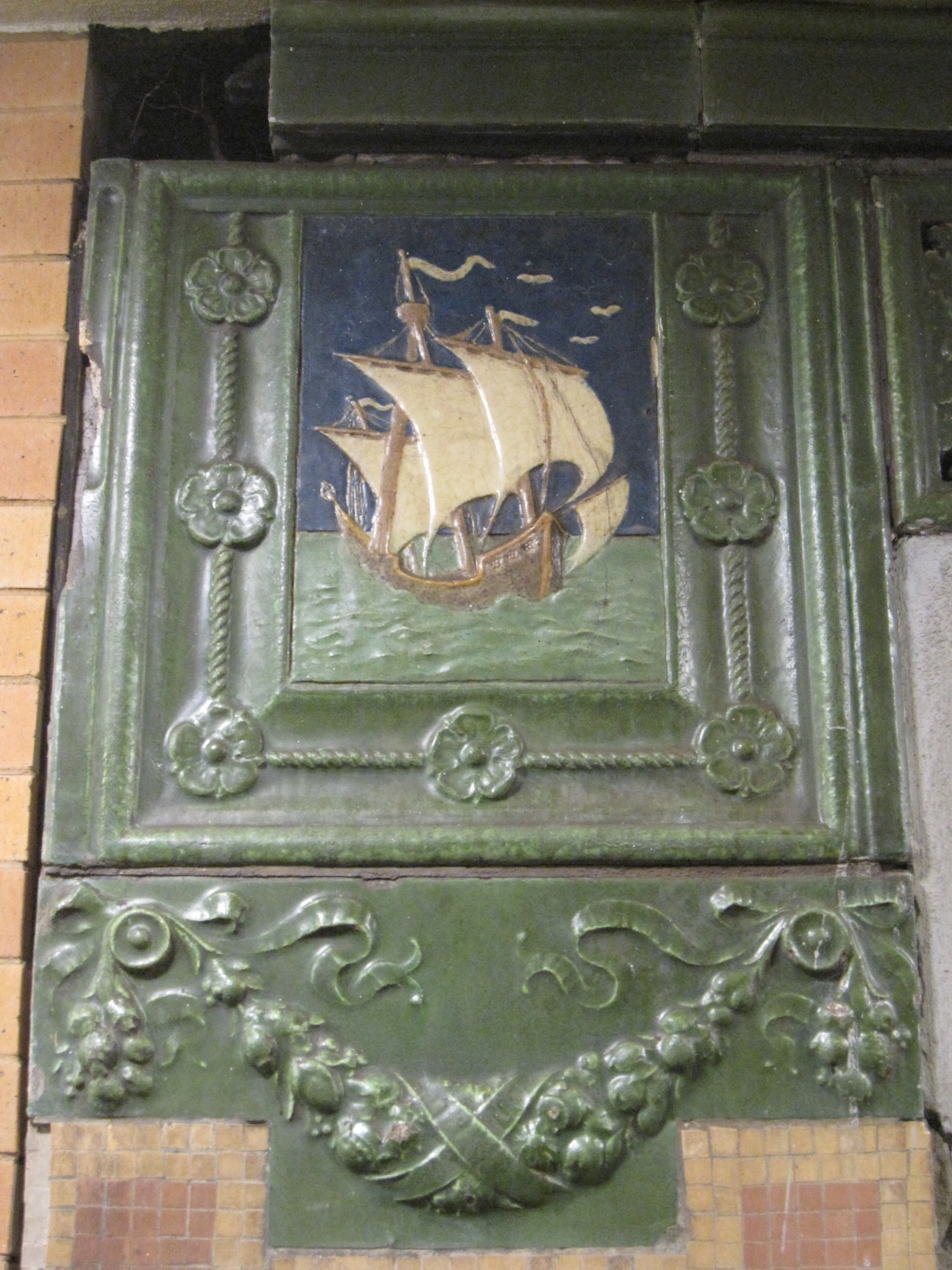
Original cartouche featuring Columbus's ship the Santa Maria

To address overcrowding, in 1909, the New York Public Service Commission (PSC) proposed lengthening the platforms at stations along the original IRT subway. As part of a modification to the IRT's construction contracts made on January 18, 1910, the company was to lengthen station platforms to accommodate ten-car express and six-car local trains. In addition to $1.5 million (equivalent to $51.8 million in 2025) spent on platform lengthening, $500,000 (equivalent to $17.3 million in 2025) was spent on building additional entrances and exits. It was anticipated that these improvements would increase capacity by 25 percent. Platforms at local stations, such as the 59th Street–Columbus Circle station, were lengthened by between 20 and 30 ft (6.1 and 9.1 m). The northbound platform was extended to the south, while the southbound platform was extended to the north and south. Six-car local trains began operating in October 1910.

As early as March 1914, local business owners and workers began advocating for the 59th Street–Columbus Circle station to be converted into an express stop. That August, the PSC published a report outlining two alternatives for the station's conversion. The first option called for building a mezzanine under the tracks and relocating the platforms, while the other option called for lowering the tracks and erecting a new mezzanine above. IRT president Theodore Shonts opposed the plan, saying that the plan was too costly. Such a conversion would require underpinning the Columbus Monument directly above the station, as well as the relocation of a water main next to the subway line. In 1915, the city awarded the PSC the right to build an entrance inside a building on the north side of Columbus Circle, replacing an entrance on the sidewalk.

The Broadway Association recommended in mid-1922 that a new entrance be built on the south side of Columbus Circle, since pedestrians had to cross heavy vehicular traffic in the circle. In December 1922, the Transit Commission approved a $3 million project to lengthen platforms at 14 local stations along the original IRT line, including 59th Street and five other stations on the Broadway–Seventh Avenue Line. Platform lengths at these stations would be increased from 225 to 436 ft (69 to 133 m). The commission postponed the platform-lengthening project in September 1923, at which point the cost had risen to $5.6 million.

=== IND expansion ===
New York City mayor John Francis Hylan's original plans for the Independent Subway System (IND), proposed in 1922, included building over 100 mi (160 km) of new lines and taking over nearly 100 mi (160 km) of existing lines. The lines were designed to compete with the existing underground, surface, and elevated lines operated by the IRT and Brooklyn–Manhattan Transit Corporation (BMT). On December 9, 1924, the New York City Board of Transportation (BOT) gave preliminary approval to the construction of a subway line along Eighth Avenue, running from 207th Street. The Eighth Avenue Line station was originally planned to be located at 57th Street, with entrances extending up to 61st Street. By 1927, the IND station had been relocated to be nearer the IRT station, forming a major transit hub under Columbus Circle. The BOT announced a list of stations on the new line in February 1928, with an express station at 58th Street.

Though most of the Eighth Avenue Line was dug using a cheap cut-and-cover method, workers at 59th Street–Columbus Circle had to be careful to not disrupt the existing IRT line overhead. Workers blasted out a portion of the station site, but they had to halt the work when an IRT train passed by. The Columbus Monument was shored up during the work. The underpinning process was overseen by John H. Myers, the engineer who had been responsible for underpinning the monument during the construction of the IRT station. In October 1928, the BOT awarded a $444,000 contract to Charles Mead & Co. for the completion of the 50th Street, 59th Street, and 72nd Street stations on the Eighth Avenue Line. The finishes at the three stations were 20 percent completed by May 1930. By that August, the BOT reported that the Eighth Avenue Line was nearly completed and that the three stations from 50th to 72nd Street were 99.9 percent completed. The entire line was completed by September 1931, except for the installation of turnstiles.

A preview event for the new subway was hosted at Columbus Circle on September 8, 1932, two days before the official opening. The Eighth Avenue Line station opened on September 10, 1932, as part of the city-operated IND's initial segment, the Eighth Avenue Line between Chambers Street and 207th Street. There was a direct connection with the IRT station at Columbus Circle; initially, passengers had to pay an additional fare to transfer between the IRT and the IND. The New York Herald Tribune described the 59th Street station as one of three "showplaces" on the new IND line, the others being the 14th Street and 42nd Street stations. The construction of the Eighth Avenue Line caused real-estate values along Eighth Avenue to increase by as much as 400 percent. One developer predicted that the IND station's construction would spur development around Columbus Circle, similar to the development boom that had taken place around Times Square when the original IRT had been built.

Although the IND station was built with three island platforms, the center platform (between the two express tracks) was not used for the first two decades of the station's operation. IND employees did use the center platform for musical performances during Christmas. In the 1930s, the Works Progress Administration (WPA) proposed decorating the 59th Street station and other IND stations with murals. Supporters of the WPA's plan created a mockup of two murals for the 59th Street station in early 1939. One mural would have depicted a map of Manhattan's subway lines, flanked by "typical street scenes", while the other mural would have depicted Christopher Columbus, flanked by scenes depicting Central Park. In addition, relief panels would have been placed above the stairways leading to the northbound and southbound platforms, respectively depicting personifications of winter and summer.

=== Modifications and later changes ===
==== 1940s and 1950s ====
The city government took over the IRT's operations on June 12, 1940. A large sporting arena was then proposed for the western side of Columbus Circle in 1946, with a tunnel connecting directly to the 59th Street–Columbus Circle station. The arena plan, originally envisioned as a replacement for Madison Square Garden, ultimately evolved into the New York Coliseum convention center. As part of the unification of the New York City Subway system, the passageways between the IRT and IND stations were placed inside fare control on July 1, 1948. Later the same year, a candy store opened in the mezzanine of the 59th Street station, one of the first such stores approved in the subway system.

Starting on March 24, 1953, the IND station's center express platform was opened for passenger service during rush hours; express trains opened their doors on both sides in the peak direction only. Southbound trains served the center platform in the morning, and northbound trains served the platform in the afternoon. In addition, a loudspeaker system was installed at the IND station to help regulate passenger flow. Access to the center express platform was via seven staircases, which were closed during off-peak hours. This was the first time the center express platform had been used in regular service.

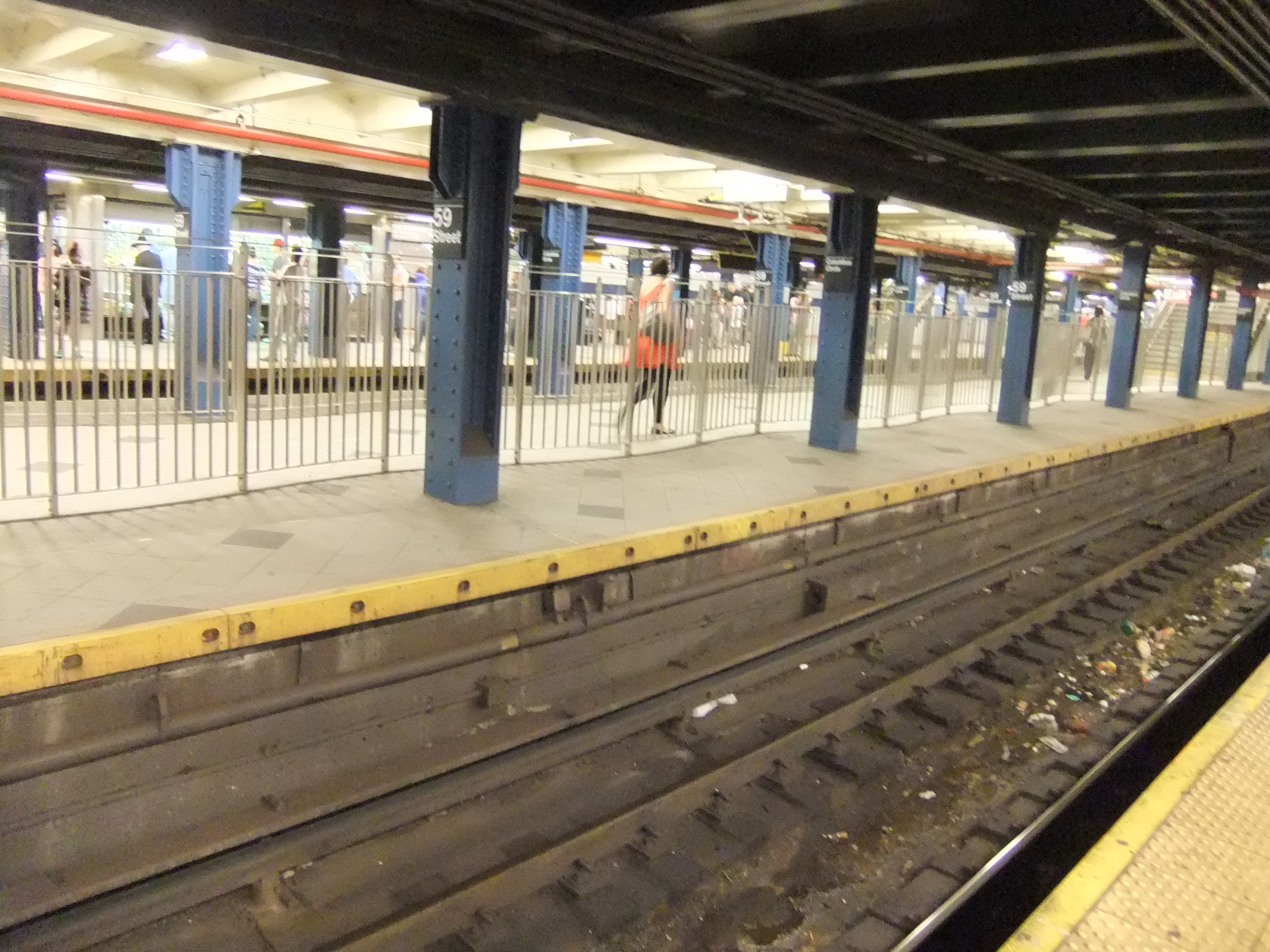
Passageway between the two IRT Broadway–Seventh Avenue Line platforms via the center IND platform

During the early 1950s, the New York City Transit Authority (NYCTA; now an agency of the Metropolitan Transportation Authority, or MTA) considered converting the IRT station to an express stop. This would serve the anticipated rise of ridership resulting from the Coliseum's completion and the expected redevelopment of the area. The conversion would entail constructing a separate island platform for express trains, similar to the arrangement at 34th Street–Penn Station, at a cost of $5 million. Additionally, a passageway would be built, connecting directly to the basement of the Coliseum. The NYCTA also considered converting the 72nd Street station to a local station. In March 1955, the NYCTA approved contracts with engineering firms for the design and construction of four projects across the subway system, including the conversion of the 59th Street station. Edwards, Kelcey and Beck was hired as consulting engineers for the station conversion, which never occurred. NYCTA chairman Charles L. Patterson suggested that the authority lengthen platforms at local stations along the Broadway–Seventh Avenue Line to accommodate eight-car local trains, rather than construct an express platform for the IRT at 59th Street.

The original IRT stations north of Times Square could barely fit local trains of five or six cars depending on the configuration of the trains. Stations on the line from 50th Street to 96th Street, including this station but excluding the 91st Street station, had their platforms extended in the 1950s to accommodate ten-car trains as part of a $100 million (equivalent to $1.104452055×10^{9} in 2025) rebuilding program. The joint venture of Rosoff Bros Inc. and Joseph Meltzer Associates Inc. received a contract to remodel the 50th Street, 59th Street, and 66th Street stations in February 1957. The work was complicated by the fact that the contractors could not disrupt subway service or vehicular traffic during the platform-lengthening project. The platform extensions at the local stations were completed by early 1958. Once the project was completed, eight-car local trains began operating on February 6, 1959. Due to the lengthening of the platforms at 86th Street and 96th Street, the intermediate 91st Street station was closed on February 2, 1959, because it was too close to the other two stations.

==== 1960s and 1970s ====
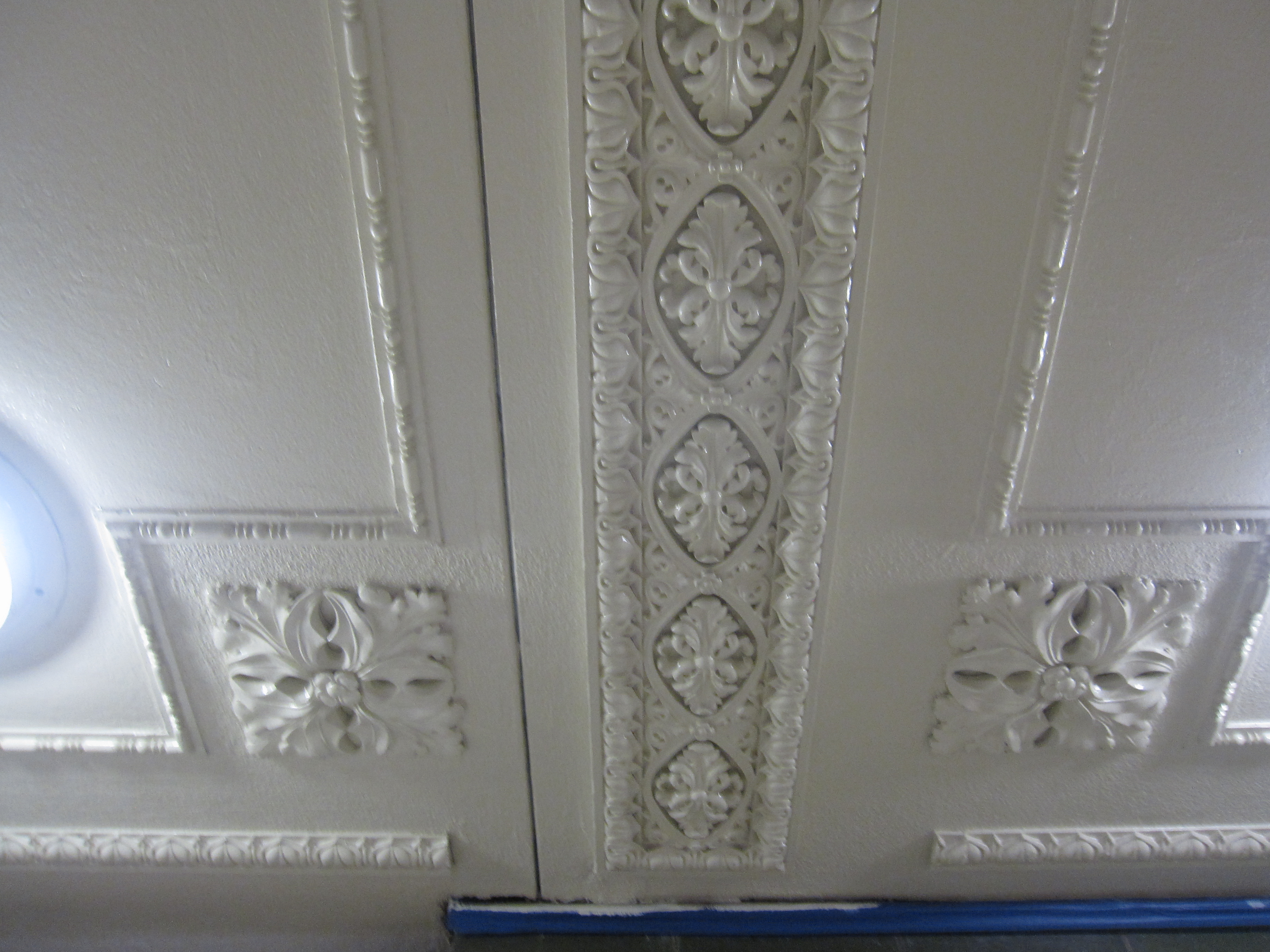
Detailed view of the IRT station's ceiling. The original IRT station had been designated as a New York City landmark in 1978.

In May 1960, the NYCTA approved businessman Huntington Hartford's offer to redesign a subway entrance on Eighth Avenue and 58th Street, next to Hartford's new Gallery of Modern Art at 2 Columbus Circle. Hartford funded the project, which was designed by the Gallery of Modern Art's architect, Edward Durell Stone. A New York Times article attributed the development of the Coliseum and 2 Columbus Circle to the presence of the 59th Street station, which had increased the neighborhood's accessibility. The Gulf and Western Building (now the Trump International Hotel and Tower) was constructed on the north side of the circle in the late 1960s. As part of that project, a sunken circular plaza was built, with a large staircase leading to the 59th Street–Columbus Circle station and to the building's basement. This plaza and entrance had been required as part of the building's construction. Though the station had a direct entrance to the Gulf and Western Building, it lacked similar connections to 2 Columbus Circle or the Coliseum.

By 1970, NYCTA officials ranked the Columbus Circle station as one of the twelve most congested places in the subway system, where trains suffered from significant delays due to overcrowding. In March 1975, the NYCTA proposed renovating the 59th Street station as part of a six-year modernization program. The same year, the Triborough Bridge and Tunnel Authority (TBTA), an MTA subsidiary that owned the Coliseum, spent $1 million on two escalators between the mezzanine and the intersection of Eighth Avenue and 58th Street. The installation included a 40 by 45 ft (12 by 14 m) fiberglass canopy above the escalators, as well as a small garden at mezzanine level near the escalators. The escalators opened in October 1975 and were intended largely for patients of the nearby Roosevelt Hospital, but they initially were often out of service due to "repeated vandalism". The MTA announced in late 1978 that it would modernize the 59th Street–Columbus Circle station. The improvements included new finishes on the walls and floors; acoustical, signage, and lighting improvements; replacement of old mechanical equipment; and new handrails. In 1979, the New York City Landmarks Preservation Commission designated the space within the boundaries of the original IRT station, excluding expansions made after 1904, as a city landmark. The station was designated along with eleven others on the original IRT.

==== 1980s and 1990s ====
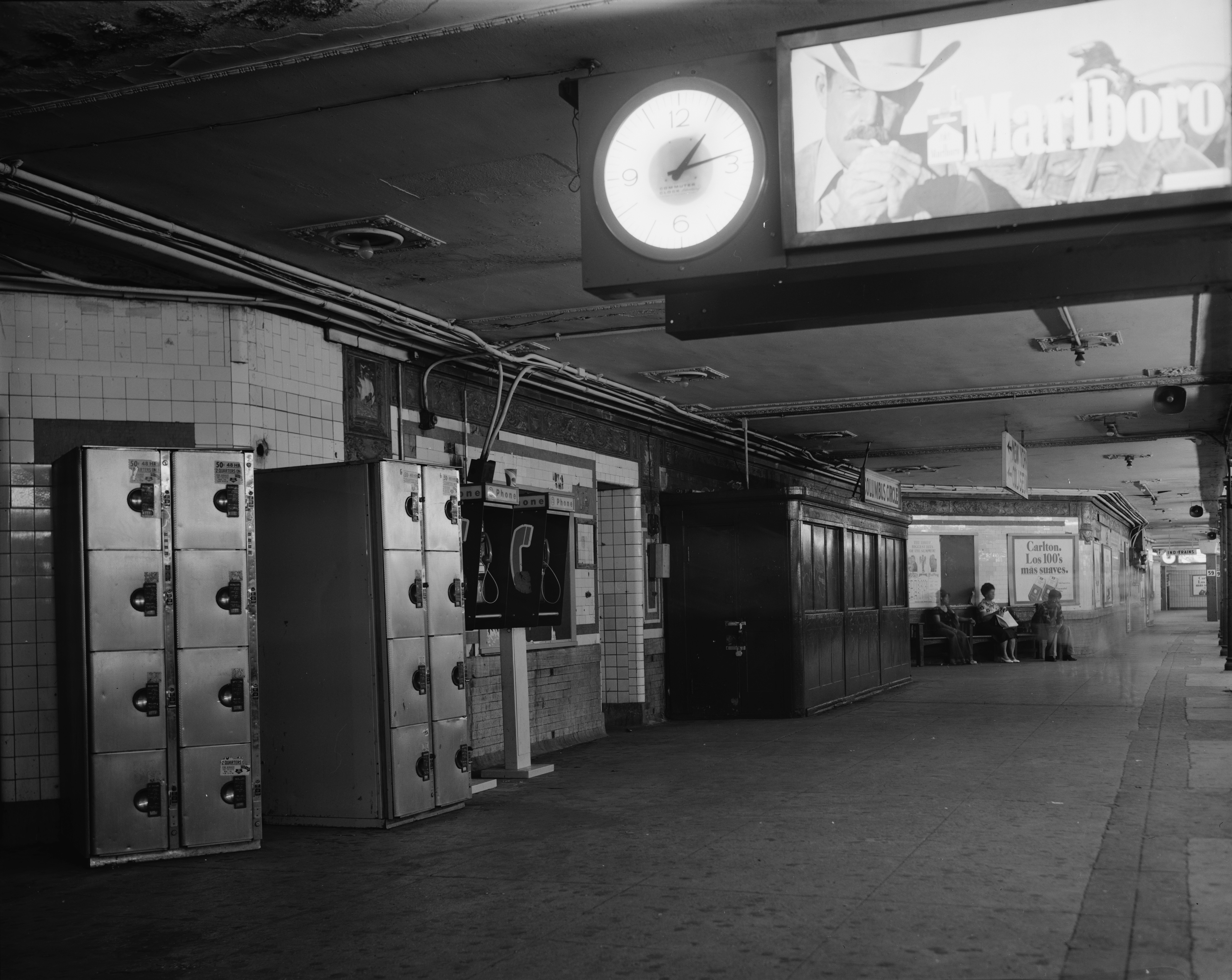
The uptown IRT platform in 1978

As part of a pilot program to reduce crime in the New York City Subway system, in May 1981, the MTA spent $500,000 on 76 CCTV screens at the Columbus Circle subway station, monitored by the New York City Transit Police. Crime at the station increased in the year after the CCTV system was installed, but the Transit Police continued to use the CCTV system, and the MTA expanded the experiment to the Times Square–42nd Street station. The cameras were deactivated in 1985 after further tests showed that their presence did not help reduce crime. The MTA considered transferring 220 CCTV cameras from these stations to token booths at the stations with the most crime.

The MTA announced in 1983 that it would renovate the Columbus Circle station as part of its capital program. To fund the renovation, the MTA placed the neighboring Coliseum for sale in 1984. The next year, a joint venture of Boston Properties and Phibro-Salomon Inc. was selected to redevelop the site as part of the Columbus Center project. In exchange for a zoning bonus, the developers would have funded over $30 million in improvements to the station. The improvements would have included new elevators and escalators; rearranged entrances and staircases; wider platforms; a reconfigured mezzanine and fare control area; and an entrance into the basement of the proposed building. The MTA planned to remove most of the bas-relief plaques as part of a widening of the southbound platform, relocating two of these plaques above an escalator, though the LPC objected to the proposal.

The Coliseum sale was nullified in late 1987, and Boston Properties presented a revised proposal for Columbus Center the next year, in which it would no longer fund improvements to the Columbus Circle station. To cover a funding shortfall for the Columbus Circle station's renovation, officials considered diverting $7.7 in million of funding from a proposed renovation of the Flushing–Main Street station in Queens. A third plan for Columbus Center was presented in 1989. This proposal included $12 million to $15 million for a renovation of the Columbus Circle station; Boston Properties, the city, and the MTA would each cover one-third of that amount.

By 1990, The New York Times described the station as "a haven for many homeless people", and the station had one of Manhattan's largest homeless populations. The renovation of the Columbus Circle station was to have been funded by the sale of the Coliseum, which continued to face delays. Boston Properties withdrew from the Columbus Center project in 1994. Planning for Columbus Center restarted in May 1996, and Time Warner and The Related Companies were selected to redevelop that site into the Time Warner (now Deutsche Bank) Center in 1998. The development would include a refurbished subway entrance at 58th Street, with an elevator to the mezzanine. However, Time Warner was not obligated to renovate the station, since it was not requesting a zoning bonus for its project. The city government simultaneously planned to renovate Columbus Circle itself. An entrance or skylight for the subway station was included in two proposals for the circle's reconstruction, but the final plan did not include skylights or a new entrance.

==== 2000s to present ====
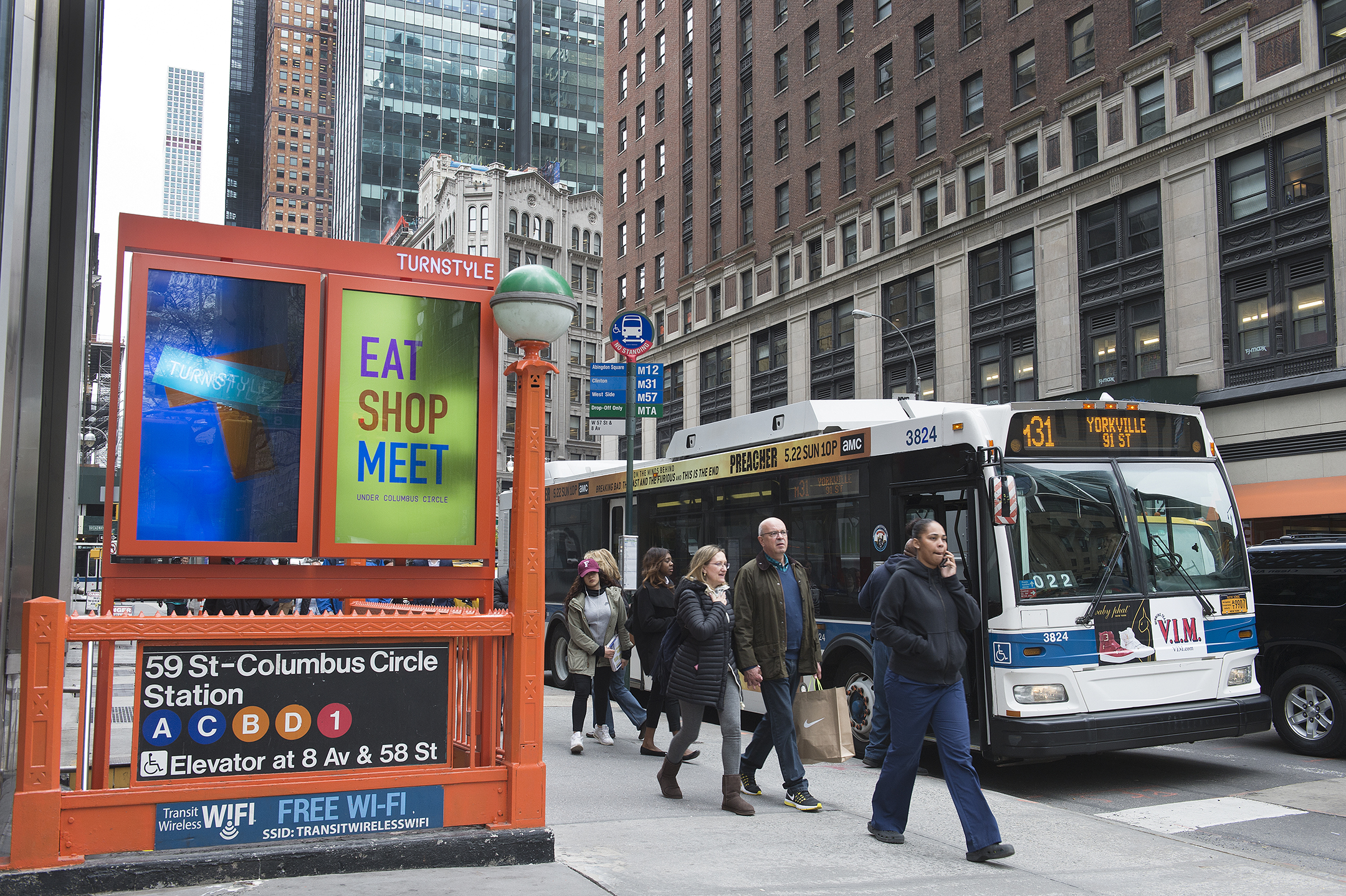
One of the station's entrances, which also leads to the TurnStyle retail complex

In 2002, as part of the construction of the nearby Hearst Tower, the Hearst Corporation proposed renovating the station in exchange for permission to include six more stories in its tower. Hearst would fund the addition of three elevators: two to the IND and southbound IRT platforms and the third to the northbound IRT platform. In addition, the company would construct an entrance, add and relocate stairways, and relocate turnstiles. The IRT station's original interiors were listed on the National Register of Historic Places in 2004. A renovation of the station started in 2006; the project cost $125 million and included new elevators, artwork, entrances, and finishes. As part of the project, two subway entrances opened at the northwest corner of 60th Street and Broadway in 2008, connecting with the downtown IRT platform. The IND station's unused express platform was converted to an underpass between the IRT platforms. Dattner Architects and WSP Global designed the renovation, which was completed in 2012.

The MTA announced in early 2014 that it would convert a section of the mezzanine between 57th and 59th Streets into a retail complex called TurnStyle. At the time, the station was the seventh-busiest in the system. According to MTA real-estate director Jeffrey Rosen, this was the first project where the MTA converted a portion of an older station to retail. The MTA initially charged rents of $275 to $425/ft^{2} ($2,960 to $4,570/m^{2}), about one-third the rate of similarly sized above-ground storefronts. The TurnStyle complex opened on April 18, 2016. TurnStyle's storefronts generally had a higher occupancy rate than those in the surrounding neighborhood; the complex had a 90 percent occupancy rate by 2019, prompting the MTA to consider building similar malls in other stations. The market was temporarily closed from March to October 2020 during the COVID-19 pandemic in New York City, although half of the market's 39 storefronts closed permanently as a result of the pandemic. Only one of TurnStyle's original stores remained by 2024, and some storeowners reported going days at a time without having any customers at all. An escalator entrance at 58th Street was temporarily closed for structural repairs in late 2024, and the MTA announced in late 2025 that a customer service center would open at the station.

=== Service history ===
==== IRT station ====
The IRT's 59th Street–Columbus Circle station opened on October 27, 1904, as one of the original 28 stations of the New York City Subway from City Hall to 145th Street on the West Side Branch. After the first subway line was completed in 1908, the station was served by local trains along both the West Side (now the Broadway–Seventh Avenue Line to Van Cortlandt Park–242nd Street) and East Side (now the Lenox Avenue Line). Local trains ran from City Hall to 242nd Street in the Bronx during rush hours, continuing south from City Hall to South Ferry at other times. East Side local trains ran from City Hall to Lenox Avenue (145th Street). The Broadway–Seventh Avenue Line opened south of Times Square–42nd Street in 1918, and the original line was divided into an H-shaped system. The original subway north of Times Square thus became part of the Broadway–Seventh Avenue Line, and all local trains were sent to South Ferry.

The IRT routes at the station were given numbered designations in 1948 with the introduction of "R-type" rolling stock, which contained rollsigns with numbered designations for each service. The Broadway route to 242nd Street became known as the 1 and the Lenox Avenue route as the 3. After the platforms at the station were lengthened in 1959, all 1 trains became local and all 2 and 3 trains became express, and eight-car local trains began operating. Increased and lengthened service was implemented during peak hours on the 1 train on February 6, 1959. In April 1988, the NYCTA unveiled plans to speed up service on the Broadway–Seventh Avenue Line through the implementation of a skip-stop service: the 9 train. When skip-stop service started in 1989, it was only implemented north of 137th Street–City College on weekdays, and 59th Street was served by both the 1 and the 9. Skip-stop service ended on May 27, 2005, as a result of a decrease in the number of riders who benefited.

==== IND station ====
When the IND Eighth Avenue Line opened, the station was served by express (A) and local (AA) trains between Chambers and 207th Street. After the IND Concourse Line opened on July 1, 1933, the C express and CC local trains started serving the station, running via the Concourse Line, while the AA was discontinued. IND service at the station was again modified on December 15, 1940, when a spur to the IND Sixth Avenue Line opened south of 59th Street. The BB and CC local trains stopped at the station only during rush hours, while the AA local train served the station during off-peak hours. The C express train ran only during rush hours, and a new express route (the D) was established, running at all times. In 1985, the AA was relabeled the K, while the BB became the B; the K train was discontinued in 1988.

== Station layout ==
The IRT Broadway–Seventh Avenue Line platforms run diagonally to and above the IND Eighth Avenue Line platforms. The IRT station is a local stop with four tracks and two side platforms, while the IND station is an express stop with four tracks and three island platforms (one of which is not in revenue service). The complex contains two mezzanines, which contain fare control areas and connect directly to the IRT platforms. The northern mezzanine is next to the northbound IRT platform and the southern mezzanine is next to the southbound IRT platform. Passengers can transfer between the IRT platforms by descending to the IND platforms. The 59th Street–Columbus Circle station is fully wheelchair-accessible, with several elevators connecting the street, mezzanines, and platforms. The station also contains the precinct house of New York City Police Department (NYPD)'s Transit District 1.

South of the southbound IRT platform is a mezzanine leading to 57th Street. The TurnStyle retail complex occupies a 325 ft-long (99 m) portion of this mezzanine. There are stores on both sides of a central corridor measuring 27 ft (8.2 m) wide. TurnStyle contains 30 or 40 storefronts, which range from 219 to 780 ft^{2} (20.3 to 72.5 m^{2}). TurnStyle is divided into three sections: a marketplace at the south end, retail stores in the middle, and an area with "grab-and-go" restaurants at the north end. Deliveries are made via a staircase with an enclosed conveyor belt leading from the street, and garbage is taken out through the same conveyor belt.

=== Artwork ===
This station formerly had an artwork called Hello Columbus, installed in 1992 and made by various New York City artists and public school students. The artwork consisted of 74 aluminum plaques, each measuring 3 by 3 ft (0.91 by 0.91 m).

As part of the MTA Arts & Design program, Sol LeWitt designed a mosaic on the stairway from the IND platforms to the uptown IRT platform, Whirls and Twirls, which was installed in 2009. Whirls and Twirls is rectangular in shape, measuring 53 by 11 ft (16.2 by 3.4 m). It consists of 250 porcelain tiles in six colors, which are arranged in a curving pattern within the rectangle. LeWitt also designed two light-and-dark-gray porcelain compass roses on the station floor. One of the compass roses is near the Deutsche Bank Center entrance, while the other is near 58th Street.

=== Entrances and exits ===
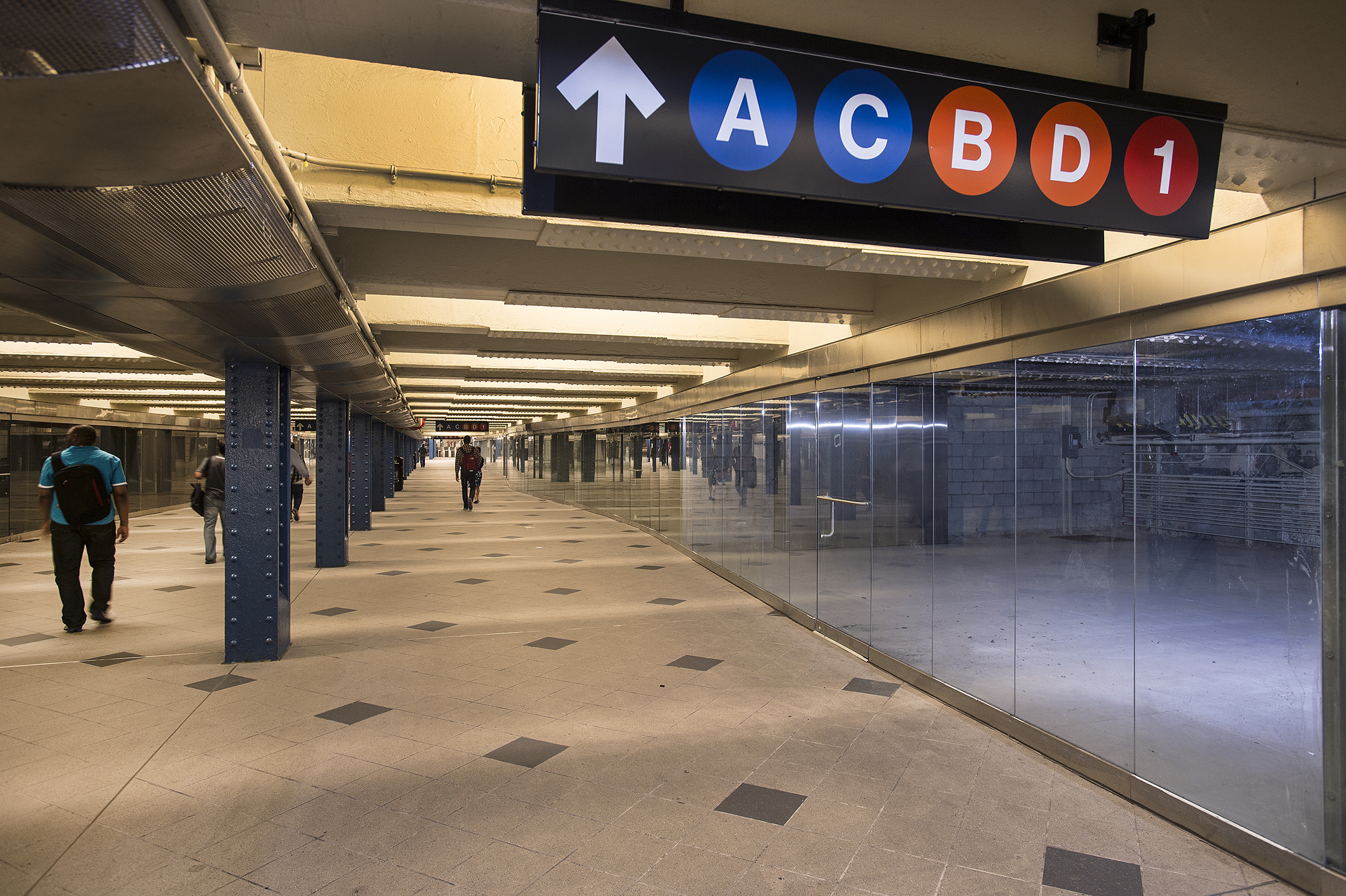
Retail space

This station complex has several entrances and exits from street level. Most of the station's exits are from the two mezzanines. The one at the north end of Columbus Circle leads to the Trump International Hotel and Tower. A wide staircase from that plaza leads to the northern part of the IND mezzanine, adjacent to the north end of the northbound IRT platform. There is also an elevator at the same corner. An additional staircase leads to the east side of Central Park West, just north of Columbus Circle.

The south end of the northbound IRT platform has a fare control area leading to two staircases. These staircases ascend to the southeastern corner of Central Park South and Broadway, just outside 240 Central Park South.

Two staircases from the northwest corner of Broadway and 60th Street descend to a fare control area leading to the southbound IRT platform. There are two additional staircases from the median of Broadway between Columbus Circle and 60th Street, which also lead to a fare control area adjacent to the southbound IRT platform. A staircase to the southwest corner of that intersection was proposed as part of the Columbus Center project but was never built.

The Deutsche Bank Center at the northwest corner of 58th Street and Eighth Avenue has an elevator, escalators, and a staircase descending to a fare control area. The mezzanine also has a staircase to the northeast corner of 58th Street and Eighth Avenue, outside 2 Columbus Circle. There is a passageway leading to two sets of easement staircases at 57th Street and Eighth Avenue. A single staircase, within the Central Park Place building, ascends to the northwest corner of the intersection. At the southeast corner, two staircases ascend to the Hearst Tower: one to Eighth Avenue and one to 57th Street.

In October 1992, at a public hearing, New York City Transit proposed closing street staircase S6 to the northwest corner of 61st Street and Central Park West (outside what is now 15 Central Park West) and reopening street staircase S2 at 60th Street and Central Park West, located to the east of the circular stair, in order to expand the Transit Police District Command to accommodate more officers and increase the efficiency of the operation. The circular staircase was expected to be reconstructed to provide more direct access. The 61st Street exit was operated part-time, closing at nights; it consisted of a high exit turnstile and was used by 2,400 daily passengers. It was located in a remote unmonitored portion of the station, making safety an added consideration for its closure. Four staircases to the two platforms that led to the passageway leading to the exit were removed.

== IRT Broadway–Seventh Avenue Line platforms ==
59 Street–Columbus Circle
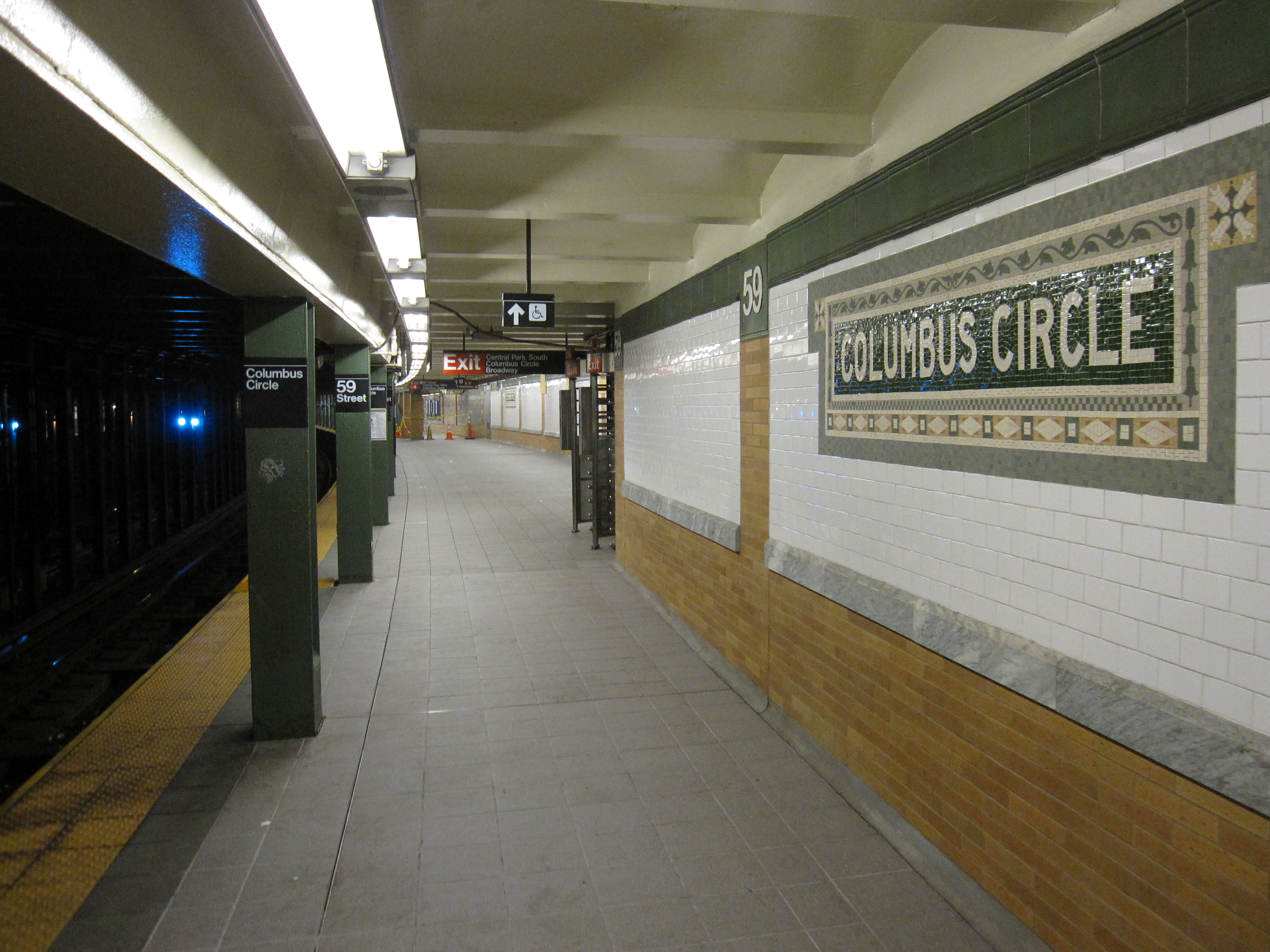
- View from the northbound platform

Station statistics
- Division: A (IRT)
- Line: IRT Broadway–Seventh Avenue Line
- Services: 1 (all times); 2 (late nights)
- Structure: Underground
- Platforms: 2 side platforms
- Tracks: 4

Other information
- Opened: October 27, 1904; 122 years ago
- Accessible: Yes
Services
Preceding station	New York City Subway	Following station
66th Street–Lincoln Center 1 2 toward Van Cortlandt Park–242nd Street	Local	50th Street 1 2 toward South Ferry
does not stop here
Track layout
Station service legend
Symbol	Description
Stops all times	Stops all times
Stops late nights only	Stops late nights only
- 59th Street – Columbus Circle (IRT)
- U.S. National Register of Historic Places
- New York State Register of Historic Places
- New York City Landmark
- MPS: New York City Subway System MPS
- NRHP reference No.: 04001015
- NYSRHP No.: 06101.000052
- NYCL No.: 1096

Significant dates
- Added to NRHP: September 17, 2004
- Designated NYSRHP: July 20, 2004
- Designated NYCL: October 23, 1979

The 59th Street–Columbus Circle station is a local station on the IRT Broadway–Seventh Avenue Line that has four tracks and two side platforms. The local tracks are used by the 1 at all times and by the 2 during the night; the express tracks are used by the 2 train during daytime hours and by the 3 train at all times. The station is between 66th Street–Lincoln Center to the north and 50th Street to the south. The platforms were originally 200 ft (61 m) long, like at other local stations on the original IRT, and ranged between 9.5 ft (2.9 m) wide at the ends and 43 ft (13 m) wide at the center. As a result of the 1958–1959 platform extension, the platforms became 520 ft (160 m) long.

=== Design ===
As with other stations built as part of the original IRT, the station was constructed using a cut-and-cover method. The tunnel is covered by a U-shaped trough that contains utility pipes and wires. This trough contains a foundation of concrete no less than 4 inches (100 mm) thick. Each platform consists of 3-inch-thick (7.6 cm) concrete slabs, beneath which are drainage basins. The platform floor was originally divided into white granolithic slabs measuring 3 by 3 ft (0.91 by 0.91 m). These slabs curved upward at the intersection with each wall, preventing debris buildup. The original platforms contain circular, cast-iron Doric-style columns spaced every 15 feet (4.6 m), while the platform extensions contain I-beam columns. Additional columns between the tracks, spaced every 5 ft (1.5 m), support the jack-arched concrete station roofs. The ceiling ranges from 9.5 to 19 ft (2.9 to 5.8 m) high. There is a 1-inch (25 mm) gap between the trough wall and the platform walls, which are made of 4-inch (100 mm)-thick brick covered over by a tiled finish.

The walls along the southbound platform and a short stretch of the northbound platform consist of a brick wainscoting on the lowest part of the wall and white glass tiles above, while the rest of the northbound platform has ceramic tile walls. The wainscoting is about 2.5 to 3 ft (0.76 to 0.91 m) high and is topped by a band of green marble with white veining. The platform walls are divided at 15 ft (4.6 m) intervals by green and red tile pilasters, or vertical bands. Atop each pilaster are faience plaques in blue, green, brown, and cream. These are flanked by square tiles depicting the Santa María, one of Christopher Columbus's ships. The walls contain two varieties of mosaic tile plaques, with the name "Columbus Circle" in white letters, alternating with each other. One variety of name plaques contains a green-mosaic background, while the other has a green faience background with half-circle motifs and Renaissance style moldings. There were originally four such plaques on each platform. The mosaic tiles at all original IRT stations were manufactured by the American Encaustic Tile Company, which subcontracted the installations at each station. The decorative work was performed by faience contractor Grueby Faience Company. Hidden behind the current station wall is a prototype of a mosaic installed in 1901; it consists of red and yellow mosaic tiles in a guilloche pattern.

Various doorways lead off both platforms. On each platform, two of the doorways led to restrooms for women and men. Each restroom had ceramic-tile floors, glass walls, and marble-and-slate partitions; patrons paid five cents to enter. The ceilings of the original platforms and fare control areas contain plaster molding. The moldings divide the original ceilings into panels measuring 15 feet wide. Blue tile was used for the ceilings above the tracks, while yellow plaster was used for the ceilings above the platforms. The mezzanines leading off either platform contain ceramic tiles and flooring. The original exit stairways (now removed or upgraded) were 5.5 to 6 ft (1.7 to 1.8 m) wide.

In January 1992, the MTA Board approved a request by the NYCTA to close 43 full-time or part-time station areas at 30 station complexes. These included an underpass near the northern end of the station, west of the IND platforms, which connected the northbound and southbound platforms.

== IND Eighth Avenue Line platforms ==
59 Street–Columbus Circle
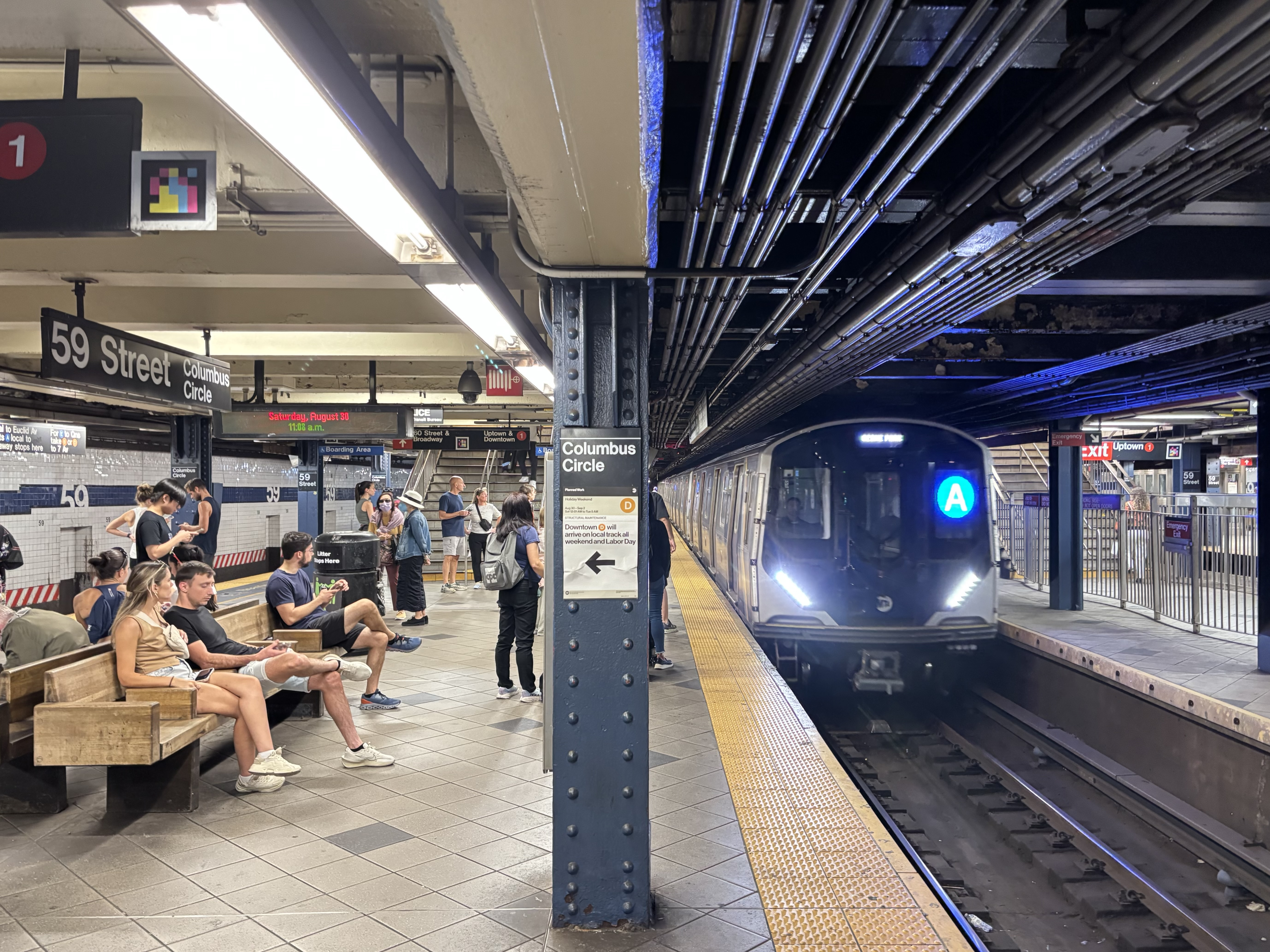
- R211A A train arriving at the southbound platform

Station statistics
- Division: B (IND)
- Line: IND Eighth Avenue Line
- Services: A (all times); B (weekdays during the day); C (all except late nights); D (all times)
- Structure: Underground
- Platforms: 3 island platforms (2 in passenger service) cross-platform interchange
- Tracks: 4

Other information
- Opened: September 10, 1932; 94 years ago
- Accessible: Yes
Services
Preceding station	New York City Subway	Following station
125th Street A D via 145th Street	Express	42nd Street–Port Authority Bus Terminal A toward Far Rockaway–Mott Avenue or Ozone Park–Lefferts Boulevard
125th Street A D via 145th Street	Express	Seventh Avenue B D via Grand Street
72nd Street A B C via 145th Street	Local	Seventh Avenue B D via Grand Street
72nd Street A B C via 145th Street	Local	50th Street A C toward Euclid Avenue
Track layout
Station service legend
Symbol	Description
Stops all times except late nights	Stops all times except late nights
Stops all times	Stops all times
Stops late nights only	Stops late nights only
Stops weekdays during the day	Stops weekdays during the day

The 59th Street–Columbus Circle station on the IND Eighth Avenue Line is an express station with four tracks and three island platforms. Only the outer two platforms are used for passenger service, allowing cross-platform interchanges between local and express trains heading in the same direction. The station is served by A and D trains at all times, C trains except at night, and B trains on weekdays during the day. B and C trains always use the local tracks and D trains always use the express tracks. A trains use the express tracks during the day and the local tracks during the night. The next stop to the north is 72nd Street for local trains and 125th Street for express trains; there are seven local stations between 59th and 125th Streets. The next stop to the south is 50th Street for Eighth Avenue local A and C trains, 42nd Street–Port Authority Bus Terminal for Eighth Avenue express A trains, and Seventh Avenue for Sixth Avenue express B and D trains.

=== Design ===
The walls of the station contain blue-tile bands with black borders; since 59th Street is an express station, it has a wider tile band than local stations. Large white "59"s are placed over the blue stripes. The tile colors are intended to help riders identify their station more easily, part of a color-coded tile system for the entire Independent Subway System. The tile colors were designed to facilitate navigation for travelers going away from Lower Manhattan; on the Eighth Avenue Line, the tiles change color at the next express station to the north. As such, the blue tiles used at the 59th Street station were also used on local stations to the north; the next express station, 125th Street, used a different tile color.

The stations on the Eighth Avenue Line were built with 600-foot (180 m) long platforms, but there were provisions to lengthen them to 660 feet (200 m) to accommodate eleven-car trains. Four of the express stations, including 59th Street, were built with long mezzanines so that passengers could walk the entire length of the mezzanines without having to pay a fare. It was proposed to develop the mezzanines of these four stations with shops, so that they would become retail corridors, similar to the underground mall at Rockefeller Center. Above the south end of the station is an underground arcade connecting 57th and 58th Streets, which was originally flanked by stores. The mezzanine also enabled pedestrians to cross under Columbus Circle.

=== Track layout ===
South of the station, A and C trains continue along the Eighth Avenue Line, while B and D trains diverge east to the Seventh Avenue station via the IND Sixth Avenue Line. North of the station are crossovers in both directions, and the northbound tracks cross over the southbound tracks to form a two-level configuration, used at all local stations on the line through 103rd Street. The distance between the 59th Street station and the next express stop, 125th Street, was intended to "avoid much delay and confusion" by reducing the number of local–express transfer stations.

== Nearby points of interest ==
- Central Park
- Church of St. Paul the Apostle
- Deutsche Bank Center (including Jazz at Lincoln Center)
- Fordham University
- John Jay College of Criminal Justice
- Museum of Arts & Design
- New York Institute of Technology
- Professional Children's School

== Ridership ==
In 2019, the station had 23,040,650 boardings, making it the eighth most-used station in the 423-station system. This amounted to an average of 72,959 passengers per weekday. Due to the COVID-19 pandemic in New York City, ridership dropped drastically in 2020, with only 7,618,925 passengers entering the station that year. However, it was still the system's eighth most-used station.
