= 145th Street station (IND lines) =

New York City Subway station in Manhattan

145 Street
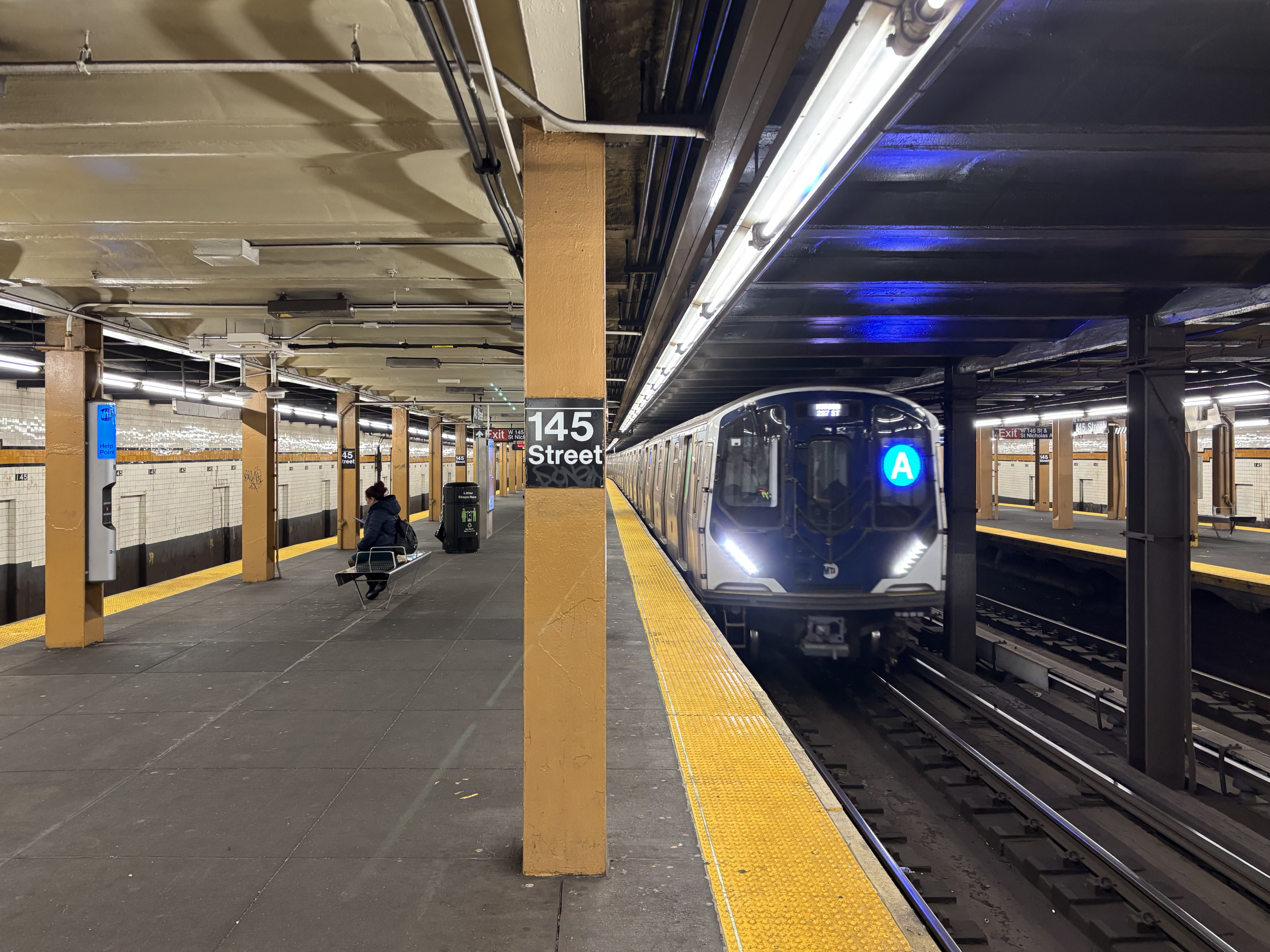
- Northbound R211A A train arriving on the upper level

Station statistics
- Address: West 145th Street & St. Nicholas Avenue; New York, New York
- Borough: Manhattan
- Locale: Harlem, Hamilton Heights
- Coordinates: 40.82404°N 73.944769°W
- Division: B (IND)
- Line: IND Eighth Avenue Line; IND Concourse Line
- Services: A (all times); B (weekdays during the day); C (all except late nights); D (all times)
- Transit: NYCT Bus: Bx19, M2, M3, M10, M100, M101
- Structure: Underground
- Levels: 2
- Platforms: 4 island platforms (2 on each level) cross-platform interchange
- Tracks: 7 (4 on upper level, 3 on lower level)

Other information
- Opened: September 10, 1932 (94 years ago)
- Accessible: No; under construction
- Accessibility: Cross-platform transfer available

Traffic
- 2025: 5,146,201 ▲4%
- Rank: 58 out of 423
Services
Preceding station	New York City Subway	Following station
168th Street A toward Inwood–207th Street	Express	125th Street A D via 59th Street–Columbus Circle
Tremont Avenue D Concourse express	Express	125th Street A D via 59th Street–Columbus Circle
155th Street B D toward Norwood–205th Street	Express	125th Street A D via 59th Street–Columbus Circle
Terminus	Local	135th Street A B C via 59th Street–Columbus Circle
155th Street A C toward 168th Street	Local	135th Street A B C via 59th Street–Columbus Circle
Location
Location within New York City Subway
Location within New York City
Location within New York
Track layout
Upper platforms, 8 Av Line
Lower platforms, Concourse Line
Street map
Station service legend
Symbol	Description
Stops all times except late nights	Stops all times except late nights
Stops all times except rush hours in the peak direction	Stops all times except rush hours in the peak direction
Stops all times	Stops all times
Stops late nights only	Stops late nights only
Stops rush hours only	Stops rush hours only
Stops rush hours in the peak direction only	Stops rush hours in the peak direction only
Stops weekdays during the day	Stops weekdays during the day

The 145th Street station is a bi-level express station on the IND Eighth Avenue and Concourse lines of the New York City Subway, located at the intersection of 145th Street and St. Nicholas Avenue in Harlem and Hamilton Heights, Manhattan. It is served by the A and D trains at all times, the C train at all times except late nights, and the B train on weekdays only (the latter of which terminates here during select midday trips and all evening trips). There is a New York City Police Department (NYPD) transit precinct at the station.

== History ==
=== Planning and opening ===
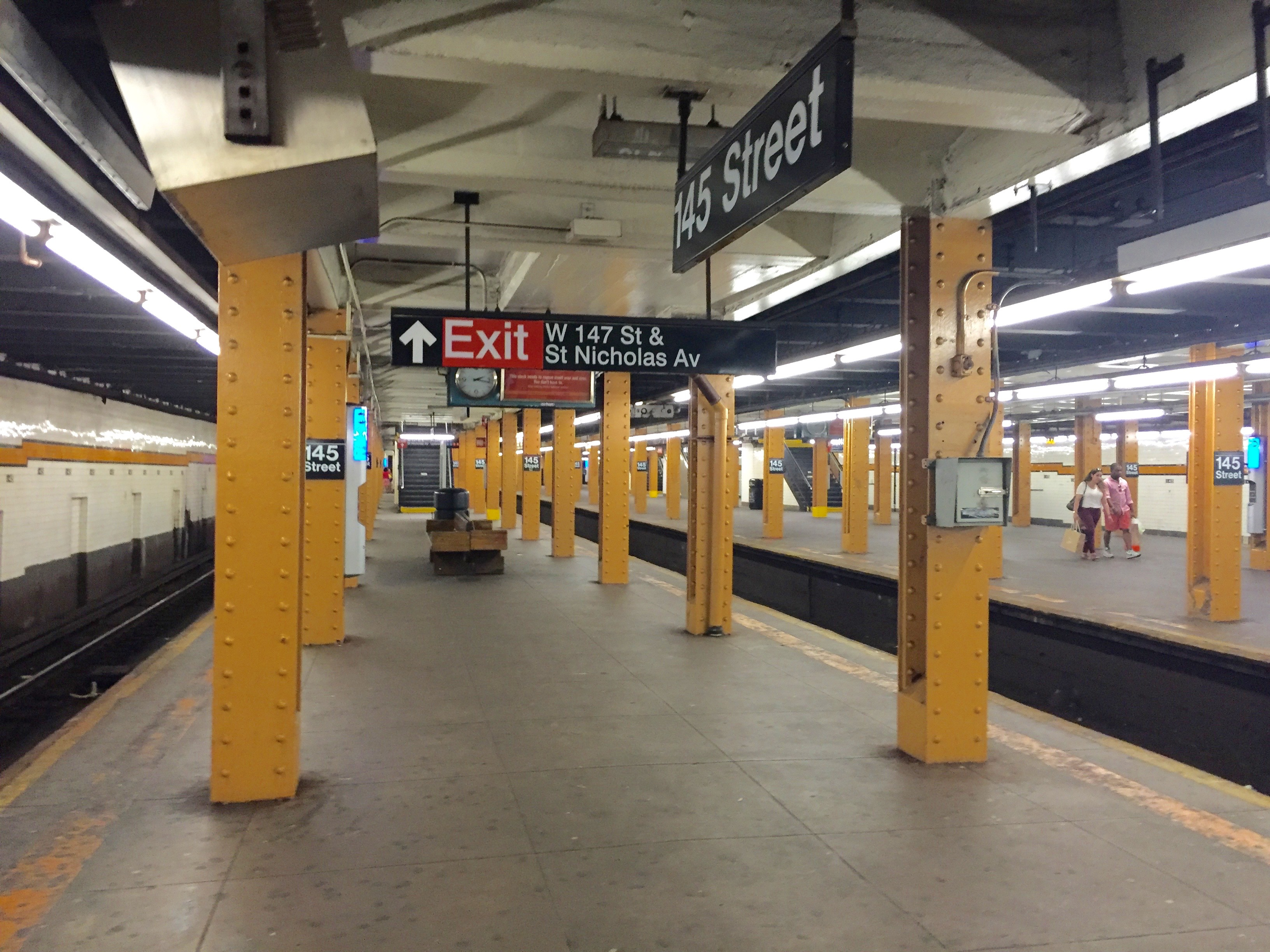
Southbound platform on the lower level

On August 3, 1923, the New York City Board of Estimate approved the Washington Heights Line, an extension of the Broadway Line to Washington Heights. The line was to have four tracks from Central Park West at 64th Street under Central Park West, Eighth Avenue, Saint Nicholas Avenue, and private property to 173rd Street, and two tracks under Fort Washington Avenue to 193rd Street. South of 64th Street, one two-track line would connect to the Broadway Line stubs at 57th Street, and another would continue under Eighth Avenue to 30th Street at Penn Station, with provisions to continue downtown.

Mayor John Hylan instead wanted to build an independent subway system, operated by the city. The New York City Board of Transportation (NYCBOT) gave preliminary approval to several lines in Manhattan, including one on Eighth Avenue, on December 9, 1924. The main portion of the already-approved Washington Heights Line—the mostly-four track line north of 64th Street—was included, but was to continue north from 193rd Street to 207th Street. South of 64th Street, the plan called for four tracks in Eighth Avenue, Greenwich Avenue, the planned extension of Sixth Avenue, and Church Street. Two tracks would turn east under Fulton Street or Wall Street and under the East River to Downtown Brooklyn.

A groundbreaking ceremony was held at St. Nicholas Avenue and 123rd Street on March 14, 1925. Most of the Eighth Avenue Line was dug using a cheap cut-and-cover method, where the street above was excavated. Still, the construction of the line was difficult, as it had to go under or over several subway lines.

The station opened on September 10, 1932, as part of the city-operated Independent Subway System (IND)'s initial segment, the Eighth Avenue Line between Chambers Street and 207th Street. At this time, only the upper level of the station opened, as the IND Concourse Line was still under construction. When the IND Concourse Line opened for service on July 1, 1933, the lower level was opened.

=== Later years ===
The station has been undergoing renovations since 2017 as part of the 2010–2014 MTA Capital Program. This is because of an MTA study conducted in 2015, which found that 45 percent of components were out of date.

In January 2024, accessibility at the station was proposed as part of the 2020-2024 Capital Program. In May 2024, the Federal Transit Administration awarded the MTA $157 million for accessibility renovations at five stations, including 145th Street. The funds would be used to add elevators, signs, and public-announcement systems, as well as repair platforms and stairs, at each station. The accessibility project was to be funded by congestion pricing in New York City, but it was postponed in June 2024 after the implementation of congestion pricing was delayed. However, after congestion pricing was approved, the MTA announced that the elevator installations would proceed.

== Station layout ==
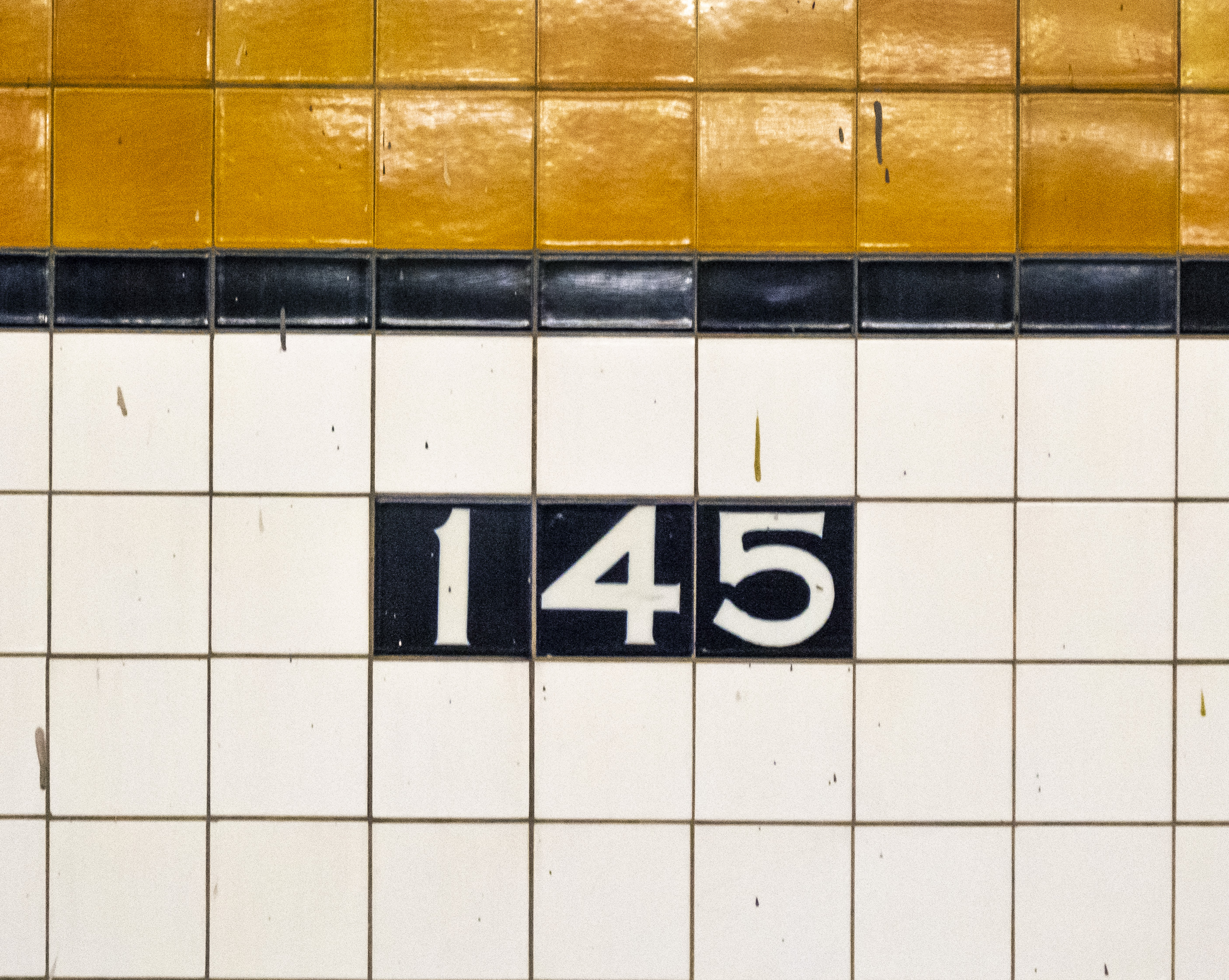
Tile caption below trim line

The 145th Street station is a bi-level express station. The upper level has four tracks and two island platforms and the lower level has three tracks and two island platforms. Both platforms offer a cross-platform interchange between express and local trains like any typical express station in the subway system. The northbound platform on the lower level is twice as wide as the station's other three similarly sized platforms, being 39 feet wide, so that the three trackways on the lower level line up directly with those above. Escalators lead up from this level to the mezzanine, bypassing the upper-level platforms.

The center track on the lower level is used to originate and terminate select B trains during limited middays and early evenings, when it does not run to and from the Bronx. During rush hours, this track is used by D trains that run express on the IND Concourse Line in the peak direction. This track is not used during late nights or weekends.

The A and D both stop here at all times; the C stops here except at night; and the B stops here only on weekdays during the day. The A and C are on the upper level and the B and D are on the lower level. The A runs express during the day and local at night. The B and C always run local. The D always runs express south of the station; it also runs express north of the station but only in the peak direction during rush hours; other times, it runs local north of the station. The next stop to the north on the upper level is 155th Street for local trains and 168th Street for express trains, while the next stop to the north on the lower level is 155th Street for local trains and Tremont Avenue for express trains. The next stop to the south for all levels is 135th Street for local trains and 125th Street for express trains.

Both levels have a trim line on the track walls, which is yellow with a black border. It is two tiles high, a pattern usually reserved for local stations. Tile captions reading "145" in white lettering on black run below the trim line at regular intervals. The trim line was part of a color-coded tile system used throughout the IND. The tile colors were designed to facilitate navigation for travelers going away from Lower Manhattan. As such, a different tile color is used at 168th Street and Tremont Avenue, the next express stations to the north on the Eighth Avenue and Concourse lines, respectively. Yellow tiles are used at the local stations between 145th Street and either 168th Street or Tremont Avenue. Yellow I-beam columns run along all the platforms, alternating ones having the standard black station name plate with white lettering.

The station used to have a full mezzanine; now, the central portion is used as a police precinct. The station contains the headquarters of the New York City Police Department (NYPD)'s Transit District 3.

=== Track layout ===
On the upper level, just north of the station, there is an open space next to the uptown local track that was a remnant of the construction of the subway and not built for a specific purpose. That open space is where the lower level tracks turn off to the IND Concourse Line. There is a hole in the floor that allows a view of the lower level.

South of this station, the seven tracks merge into four, then split back out into six tracks north of 135th Street. The six-track section continues until just north of 125th Street. The express trains use the innermost pair of tracks, and the locals uses the outermost tracks. This section of the line is nicknamed "Homeball Alley"—a reference to a home signal, a type of railway signal used in the New York City Subway system.

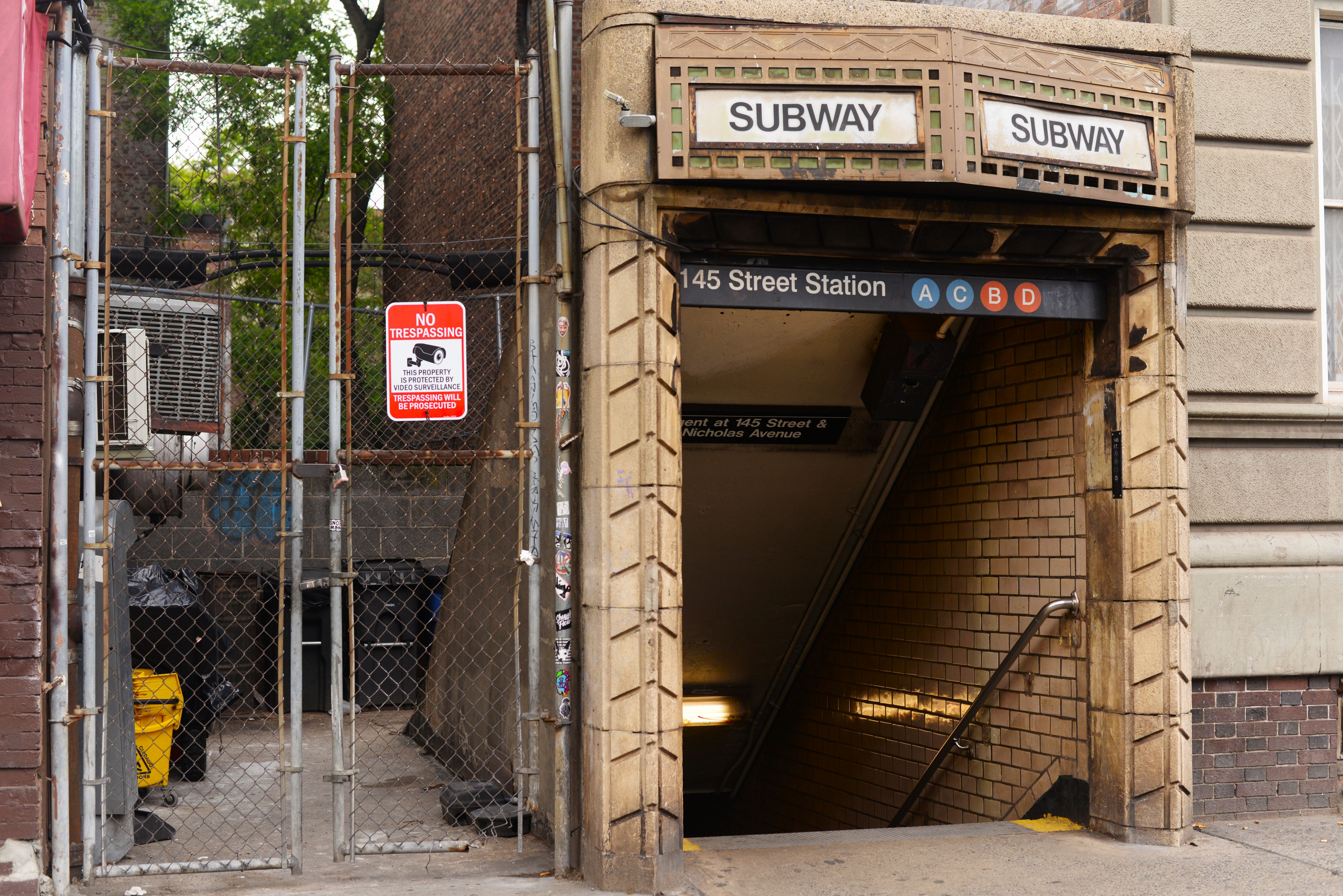
Station entrance between 147th and 148th streets.

=== Exits ===
The full-time entrance is at 145th Street with a part-time north exit at 147th Street. The station has entrances leading to each corner of St. Nicholas Avenue and West 145th Street, an entrance between buildings on the west side of St. Nicholas Avenue between West 147th and West 148th Streets, and an entrance on the east side of St. Nicholas Avenue between West 147th and West 148th Streets. There is a closed exit to the northwestern corner of St. Nicholas Avenue and West 146th Street.
