= Kappo Masa Restaurant =

Coordinates: 40.774577°N 73.963399°W

Kappo Masa
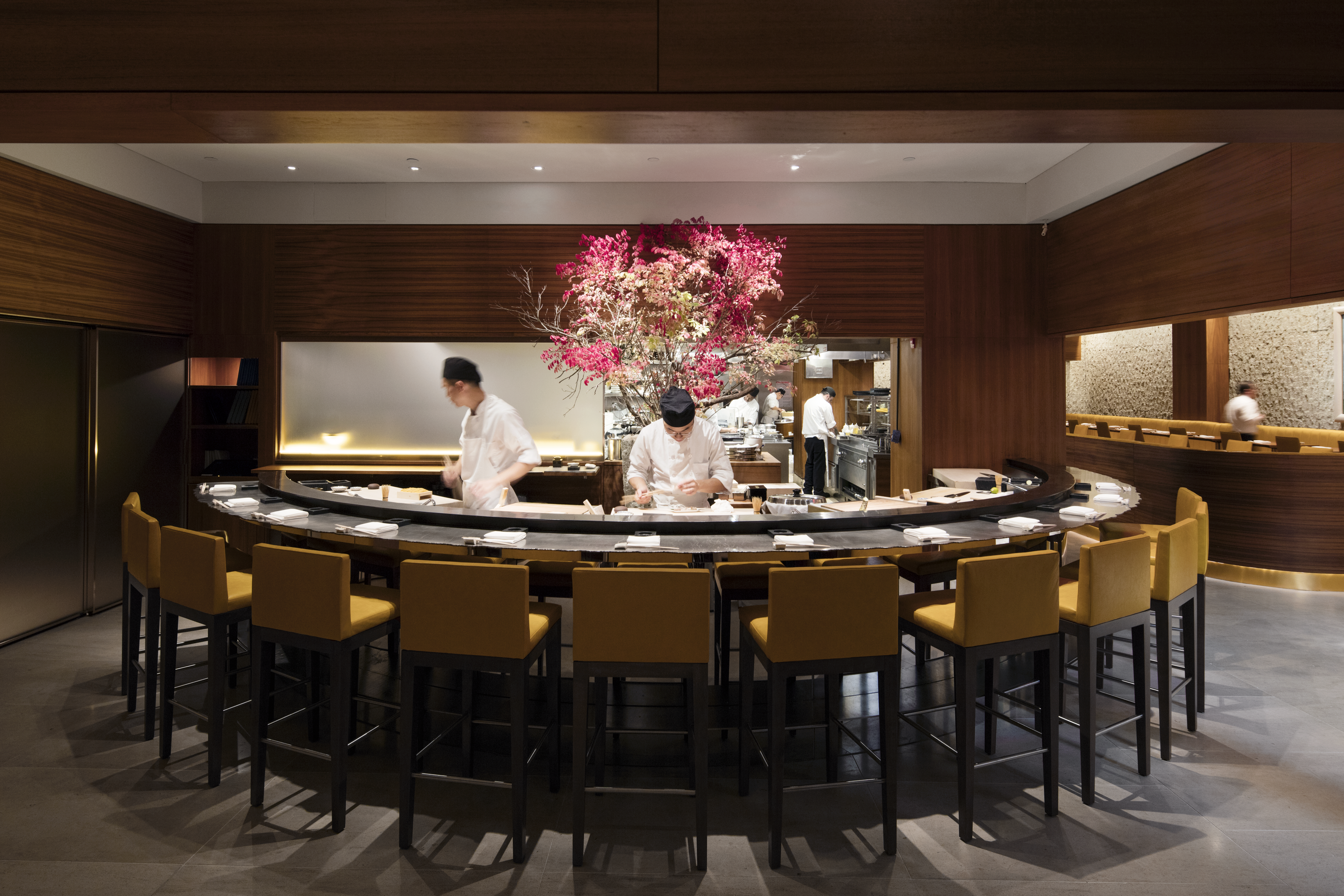
- Kappo Masa, photo by Naho Kubota
- Interactive map of Kappo Masa

Restaurant information
- Established: 2014
- Owner: Masa Takayama
- Food type: Japanese
- Location: 976 Madison Ave, New York City (Upper East Side), New York, 10075, United States
- Website: KappoMasaNYC.com

Kappo Masa is a Japanese restaurant located within the Gagosian Gallery on Madison Avenue on the Upper East Side of Manhattan in New York City.

Conceived as a venture between Michelin-starred chef Masa Takayama and art dealer Larry Gagosian, Kappo Masa serves a range of specialty small-plate dishes as well as an omakase menu, served at the restaurant’s dining counter, made by New York City-based craftsman Andre Joyau. The space, occupying what was once a bank vault, features works by artists such as Andy Warhol, Cy Twombly, and Pablo Picasso.

== Background ==
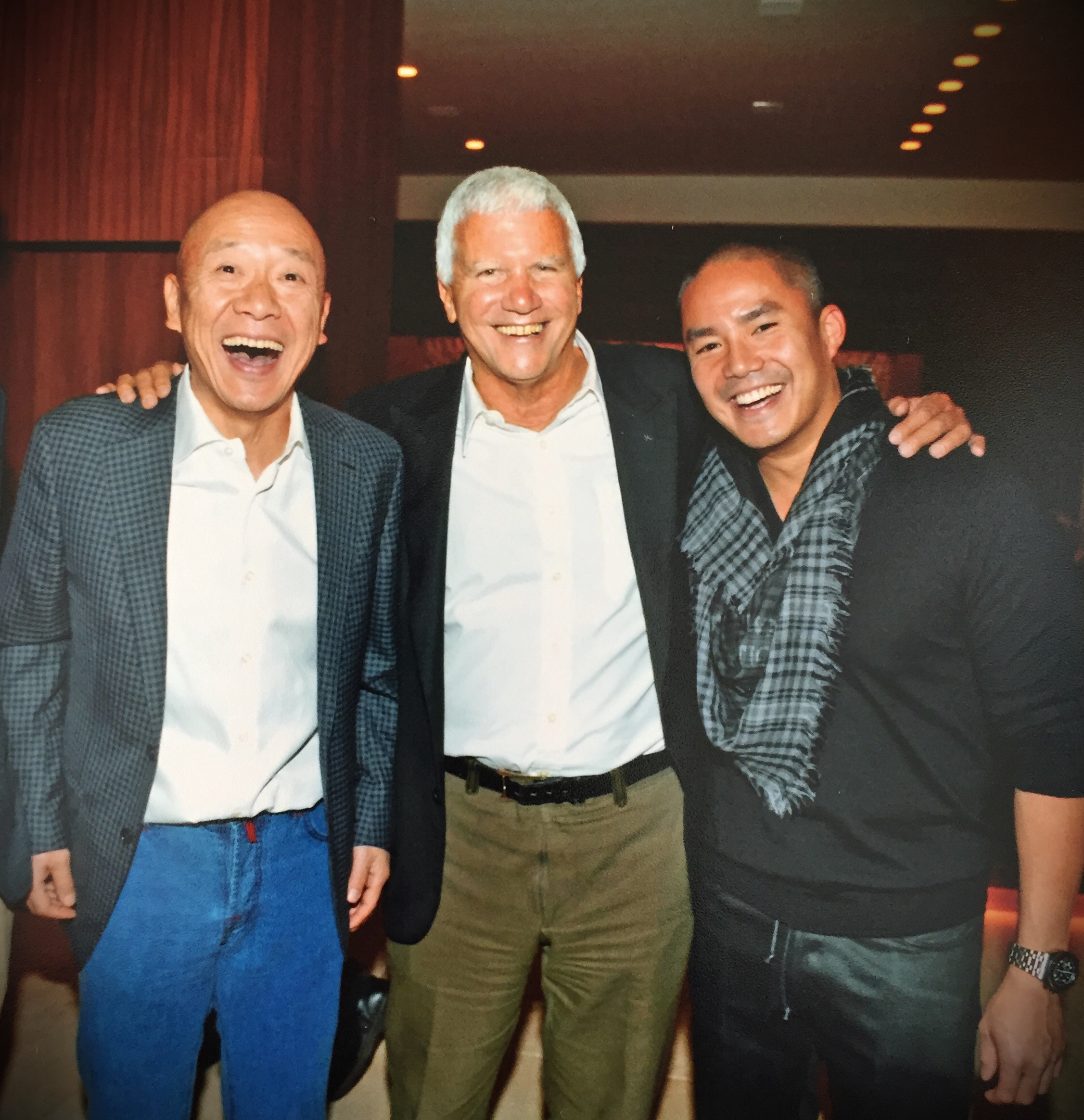
Owners Gagosian/Masa with Preeti Sriratana

Prior to opening Kappo Masa, chef Takayama has opened two other major ventures, beginning in 2004 with his eponymous three Michelin-starred restaurant, Masa, in the Time Warner Center at Columbus Circle in New York City, and subsequently with barMASA in the Aria Resort & Casino on The Strip in Las Vegas, Nevada. As a Masa regular with a long-standing interest in the hospitality world, art dealer Larry Gagosian conceived of the partnership with Takayama, as a way to expand the exposure of his contemporary and modern art gallery.

In 2012, Takayama began collaborating with New York City-based designer Preeti Sriratana, managing director of MNDPC, to design Kappo Masa restaurant. The concept was to present Chef Masa’s take on a traditional Japanese menu in a modern and casual setting. The design of the space features materials found in traditional Japanese architecture, such as teak wood and volcanic oya stone, as well as works of art from the Gagosian Gallery’s collection.

New York Times food critic Pete Wells reviewed Kappo Masa in 2015, giving it zero stars.

In September 2023, a class action lawsuit was filed against Kappo Masa. The lawsuit alleged that Kappo Masa employees were owed tip money for their services and that the restaurant “underpaid its employees by 12 percent.”
