= Larry Gagosian =

American art dealer (born 1945)

- Born: Lawrence Gilbert Gagosian; April 19, 1945 (age 81); Los Angeles, California, U.S.
- Education: University of California, Los Angeles
- Known for: Art dealer, gallery owner

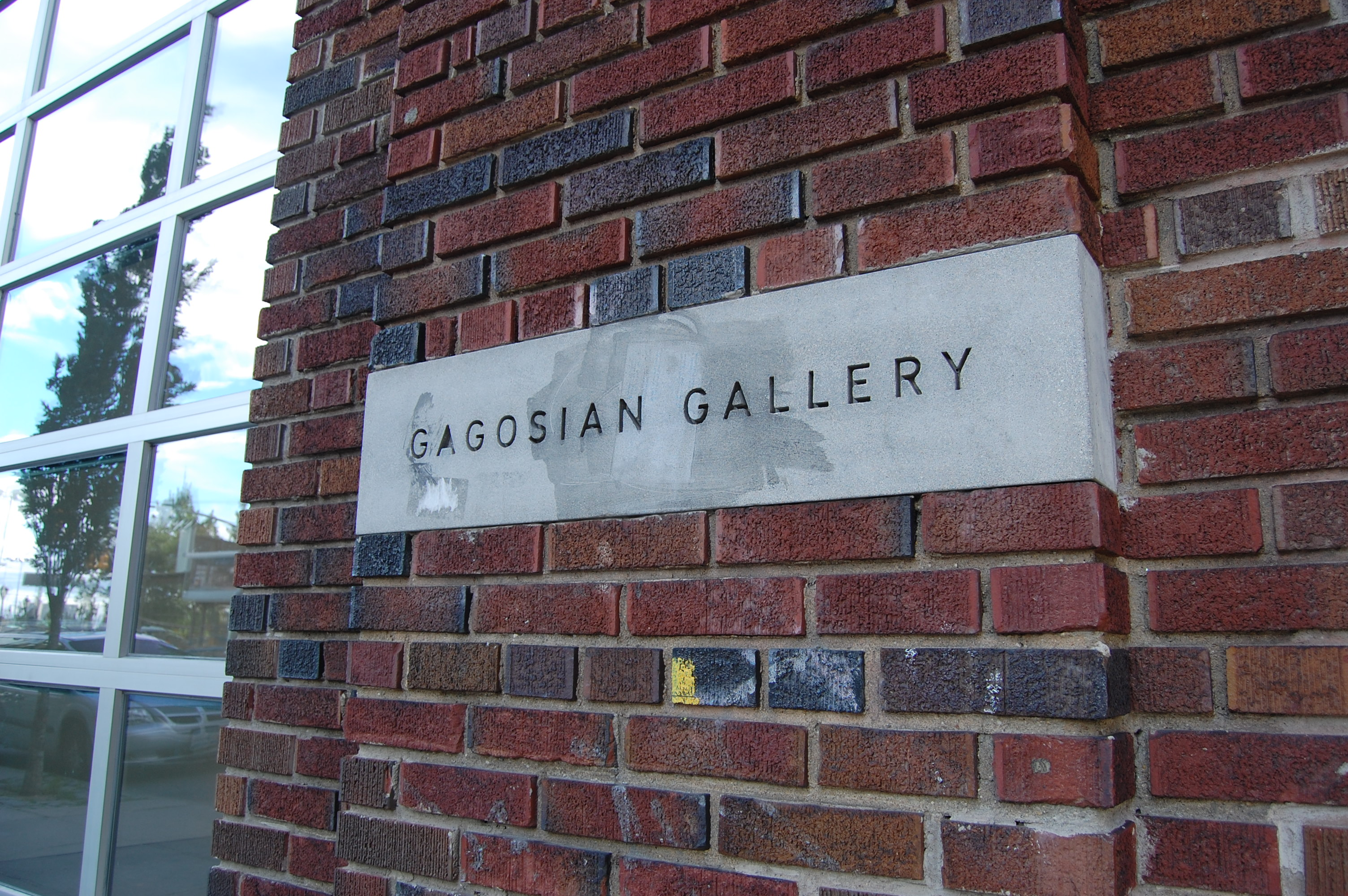
Gagosian Gallery in New York City

Lawrence Gilbert Gagosian (born April 19, 1945) is an American art dealer who owns the Gagosian Gallery chain of art galleries. Working in concert with collectors including Douglas S. Cramer, Eli Broad, and Keith Barish, he developed a reputation for staging museum-quality exhibitions of contemporary art.

== Early life and education ==
Gagosian was born April 19, 1945, in Los Angeles, the only son of Armenian parents. His mother, Ann Louise, had a career in acting and singing, and his father, Ara, was an accountant and later a stockbroker. His grandparents (original last name Ghoughasian) immigrated from Armenia; he and his parents were born in California. Growing up Gagosian was not introduced much to the art world, but his mother had been involved in theatre and movies. Furthermore, within his household, there was not much art that was owned by the Gagosian family, leaving Larry Gagosian to not find an interest within the art world in his early personal life. In addition, Gagosian believed that he had not been disciplined properly as his father had a drinking problem. Between 1963 and 1969, he pursued a major in English literature at UCLA and graduated in 1969. During his early college life, Gagosian participated in the swim team, became active in photography, and dropped out of college twice before graduating. Although Gagosian never took any classes at UCLA for art history, his initial perception of art involved clothing and one's specific appearance. More specifically, one of his English professors claimed that contemporary and abstract art were not worthy of formal discussion, causing Gagosian to disagree with the statement.

He worked briefly in a record store, a bookstore, a supermarket, and in an entry-level job as Michael Ovitz’s secretary at the William Morris Agency, but got his start in the art business by selling posters near the campus of UCLA in Los Angeles. In particular, as a parking attendant in Westwood, he noticed a street vendor that was selling posters. Intrigued by the revenue that the vendor was making, he took initiative and copied the vendor's business idea. With a new business idea in mind, Gagosian began to purchase posters from a company called Ira Roberts of Beverly Hills, buying and selling the work. As the business move began to boom and income continued to get generated, Gagosian made the decision to begin selling fine art in the form of photographs and prints. Fortunately, for Gagosian, his rise to fame included young Hollywood celebrities such as Steven Martin. With time, Gagosian would reach out to Ralph Gibson, represented by the dealer Leo Castelli, to open a West Coast exhibition. Nevertheless, through this relationship with Gibson, Castelli and Gagosian would soon become acquaintances, introducing Gagosian to prominent individuals such as Si Newhouse and the greater art dealing world.

He closed his poster shop around 1976, when a former restaurant facility became available in the same complex on Westwood's Broxton Avenue, and upgraded to prints by artists like Diane Arbus and Lee Friedlander. His gallery Prints on Broxton was renamed the Broxton Gallery when he began to show a wider array of contemporary art. The gallery worked with up-and-coming artists such as Vija Celmins, Alexis Smith, and Elyn Zimmerman, and staged exhibitions such as "Broxton Sequences: Sequential Imagery in Photography", which included the work of John Baldessari and Bruce Nauman.

== Career ==
In 1978, he opened his first gallery, on La Brea Avenue in West Hollywood, and began showing young Californians (Vija Celmins, Chris Burden) and new New Yorkers (Eric Fischl, Cindy Sherman). That same year, he bought a loft in New York on West Broadway opposite the Leo Castelli Gallery. It was Castelli who introduced Gagosian to Charles Saatchi and Samuel Newhouse Jr. In his first New York appearance, in 1979, he presented David Salle's first exhibition in a loft at 421 West Broadway, in collaboration with dealer Annina Nosei. In 1982, Nosei and Gagosian staged an exhibition of Jean-Michel Basquiat in Los Angeles. Around that time, Basquiat worked from the ground-floor display and studio space Gagosian had built below his Venice home on Market Street.

In the early 1980s, Gagosian developed his business rapidly by exploiting the possibilities of reselling works of art by blue-chip modern and contemporary artists, earning the nickname "Go-Go" in the process. After establishing a Manhattan gallery in the mid-1980s, located at the ground-floor space in artist Sandro Chia’s studio building at 521 West 23rd Street, Gagosian began to work with a stable of super collectors including David Geffen, Newhouse, Saatchi, and David Ganek. Bidding on behalf of Newhouse in 1988, Gagosian paid over $17 million for False Start (1959) by Jasper Johns, a then-record price for a work by a living artist.

On 10 May 2022, Gagosian bought one of the four Shot Marilyns paintings by Andy Warhol, for a record breaking $195 million, making it the most expensive piece of 20th century art to change hands in a public sale.Since 2014, Gagosian has been a partner at Blue Parrot, a Mexican restaurant in East Hampton, New York. In 2025, he also purchased BookHampton, an independent bookstore nearby.

In order to maintain his status and power within the art dealing world, Gagosian has hired a Black writer, Antwaun Sargent, to refreshen his perspective on modern times. This collaboration between Gagosian and Sargent has allowed for the greater representation of Black artists, such as Honor Titus. More specifically, the exhibition set in Gagosian's gallery in Beverly Hills allowed for many of Titus's work, depicting tennis courts, to be sold due to Sargent's idea to build a physical tennis court in the gallery. In addition, by signing Anna Weyant, a Canadian artist, Gagosian was able to leverage her art and its prices based on displaying it in Gagosian galleries. Although the two had become eventually involved in a relationship, their business partnership also allowed both of them to mutually benefit from the art.

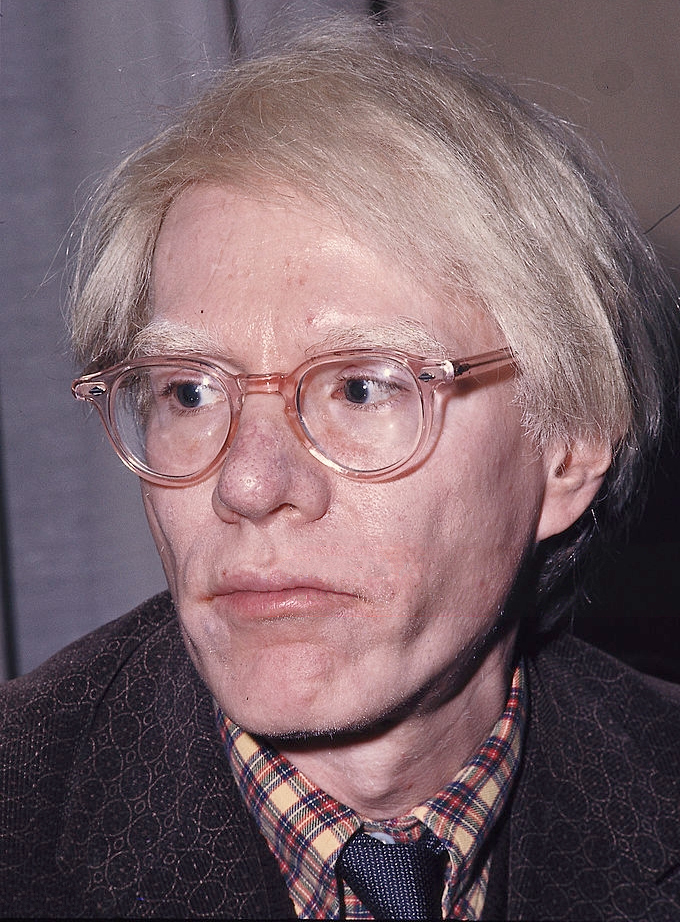
Artist Andy Warhol of Shot Sage Blue Marilyn

Today, Gagosian is the owner of over eighteen various exhibits across the United States, Europe, and Asia. In addition, his galleries are also renowned for representing a great diversity of living artists such as John Currin, Theaster Gates, Titus Kaphar, Taryn Simon, Richard Prince, Jeff Wall, Nathaniel Mary Quinn, and Mary Weatherford. Although his previous work has revolved around the various genres of art, he is currently associated with modern and contemporary art. Through his work as an art dealer, Gagosian has passed $1 billion in sales from auctions. Of his successful sales, one of the most prominent/expensive art works that were bought from Gagosian includes Andy Warhol's Shot Sage Blue Marilyn for approximately $195 million. In particular, Gagosian's success is associated with his prime condition aggression in art dealing and utilized the secondary market. More specifically, aggressiveness, in the context of art dealing associated Gagogosian with opportunities that are in front of him. In addition, the secondary market utilization refers to strategy enforced with Gagosian such that he purchases desired artwork from clients, earning commission from the side.

In addition to his career as an art dealer, Gagosian has also opened the Japanese restaurant Kappo Massa with chef Masa Takayama. More specifically, the two originally met in Los Angeles in Massa's restaurant when Robbi Robertson brought the art dealer for dinner. Fond of Gagosian's creativity and entrepreneurial ideas, Chef Takayama opened the Japanese Restaurant with Gagosian on 976 Madison Avenue in New York.

Despite Gagosian's success, the art dealer does not currently have any children. Hence, many questions arise regarding the sakes of Gagosian Galleries globally and the entirety of his private collection after his passing. Due to such concerns, several speculations have existed regarding the potential buy out of Gagosian Galleries from L.V.M.H, the luxury French brand conglomerate, though Gagosian has denied such claims.

== Recognition ==
In 2011, the British magazine ArtReview placed Gagosian fourth in their annual poll of "most powerful person in the art world". Artist Robert Longo included in his ‘Men in the Cities’ photographic series. In 2022, The Financial Times named Gagosian the most important art dealer in the world.

== Personal life ==
In his younger years, Gagosian pled guilty to two felony charges regarding use of a stolen credit card. He received a suspended sentence and probation. Gagosian considers the incident a mistake, as the credit card was being passed around by several of his friends.

Gagosian was briefly engaged to the dancer Catherine Kerr. In 2021, it was reported that he had begun a relationship with artist Anna Weyant. ArtNet News reported in 2024 that the two had separated. Currently, Gagosian is in a relationship with Italian model Erica Pelosini.

In 1988, Gagosian bought the Toad Hall estate in Amagansett, New York, with an 11,000-square-foot house designed by architect Charles Gwathmey for fellow architect François de Menil in 1983, for $8 million. In 2009, he had Christian Liaigre design a home for him in Flamands Beach on St. Barths. In 2010, internet pioneer David Bohnett sold his 5,700 square foot Holmby Hills compound, originally designed by A. Quincy Jones for Gary Cooper, to Gagosian for $15.5 million, according to public records. Gagosian bought the former Harkness Mansion, an enormous townhouse at 4 East 75th Street in Manhattan, for $36.5 million in 2011.

Although born in the United States, Gagosian still has roots to his Armenian heritage. For example, he has been known to support Armenian artist Arshile Gorky, who is deemed to be an abstract expressionist.

=== Legal issues ===
In 1969, Gagosian pleaded guilty to two felony charges of forgery, stemming from his use of someone else’s credit card. He received a suspended sentence and probation.

In 2003, Gagosian paid $4 million settlement after federal prosecutors accused him and three partners of failing to pay taxes on the sale of 58 works of art.

In 2012, suits and counter-suits were filed by Gagosian and Ronald Perelman against one another concerning an unfinished work by Jeff Koons and 10 others worth up to $45 million.

In 2012, Gagosian was sued for $14 million in a suit involving the sale of an edition of Girl in Mirror.

In September 2023, a class action lawsuit was filed against Kappo Masa, which is owned by Gagosian and Masa Takayama. The lawsuit alleges that Kappo Masa employees are owed tip money for their services and that the restaurant “underpaid its employees by 12 percent.”

== Membership ==
- Jazz at Lincoln Center, Member of the Board of Directors (since 2012)
- Museum Berggruen, Member of the International Council
- New York University Institute of Fine Arts, Member of the Board of Trustees
- Carnegie Hall, Member of the Board of Trustees
