= Wenliang =

Wenliang is a given name. Notable people with the name include:

- Li Wenliang (1985–2020), Chinese ophthalmologist, warned about early COVID-19 infections in Wuhan
- Li Wenliang (chess player) (born 1967), Chinese chess player, China's Deputy National Team Manager
- Wang Wenliang (born 1954), Chinese construction executive and elected official
- Xie Wenliang (1925–2022), Singaporean footballer who competed for China in the 1948 Summer Olympics
- Yan Wenliang (1893–1988), Chinese painter and educator
- Zhao Wenliang (1937–2019), Chinese painter, foundational member of the No Name (Wuming) Group
