= Cavan Huang =

Graphic designer

- Occupation(s): Creative director, designer
- Known for: Experience design, product design, graphic design
- Website: cavanthology.com

Cavan Huang is a creative director, designer, and design educator. He attended McGill University in Montreal where received his BA in history and urban planning. Huang then studied at Rhode Island School of Design in Providence, Rhode Island, where he received his MFA in graphic design in 2005. He creates digital ideas, products and experiences that make meaningful impact for brands and organizations. Much of his inspiration comes from the details of cities, lights, traffic, sounds, and people. Huangs work can be found in Contemporary Graphic Design, The New York Times, Ad Age, a PBS documentary, the Time Warner Center, AIGA, TED, Cannes Lions, the Webby Awards, and the White House.

== Awards ==
- 2025
  - Webby Award Nominee: Best Health & Fitness App: Planet Fitness
  - Webby Award Honoree: Best Practices: Planet Fitness
- 2024
  - Anthem Award Winner: Product Innovation: Planet Fitness
- 2021
  - Webby Award Winner: Best Public Service Activism: 9/11 Day
  - Shorty Award Silver: Non-Profit Social Good: 9/11 Day
- 2020
  - Webby Award Honoree: Best Corporate Communications: Con Edison
- 2019
  - Webby Award Honoree: Best Visual Function App: Con Edison
- 2018
  - ADC One Club Merit Award: Branding Logo: Petfinder
  - Webby Award Winner: Best Community Website: Petfinder
  - Webby Award Honoree: Best User Interface Website: Con Edison
- 2016
  - Brand New: Most Notable Brands of 2016: Petfinder
- 2015
  - Webby Award Honoree: Best Political Website: ACLU The Uncovery
- 2014
  - Rebrand 100 Award: Cabot Brand
- 2012
  - Emmy Award: Best New Approach to News & Documentary: Time Beyond 9/11: Portraits of Resilience
- 2010
  - AIGA 365 Award: AIGA MAKE/THINK Conference Titles
- 2009
  - Webby Award Honoree: Best Navigation: The Art of the Possible
- 2006
  - Nominated as 1 of 25 emerging designers, Step Inside Design magazine, New York
- 2004
  - Best Multimedia Design, Summit Creative Awards, Toronto
- 2003
  - Best Multimedia Design, Applied Arts magazine, Toronto

== Professional experience ==
- 2021-present - Executive Creative Director, HUGE, New York
- 2015–2021 - Creative Director, POSSIBLE / Wunderman Thompson / VML, New York
- 2011–2015 - Associate Creative Director, Interbrand, New York
- 2009-2014 - Adjunct Professor / Design Critic, Rhode Island School of Design, Providence
- 2007–2011 - Senior Art Director and Interactive Designer, Time Warner, New York
- 2005–2007 - Digital Media Designer, Time Warner, New York
- 2003–2005 - Instructor, Rhode Island School of Design, Providence
