= Bad Roman =

Themed restaurant in New York City

- Interactive map of Bad Roman

Restaurant information
- Established: 2023
- Owner: Quality Branded
- Head chef: Nick Gaube
- Food type: Italian-American
- Location: 3rd floor, 10 Columbus Circle within The Shops at Columbus Circle, New York City, New York, 10019
- Coordinates: 40°46′7″N 73°58′59″W
- Reservations: Required
- Website: www.badromannyc.com

Bad Roman is a faux-Roman quasi-Italian themed restaurant operated by the "Quality Branded" restaurant group and located at the Deutsche Bank Center on Columbus Circle in the borough of Manhattan in New York City.

== Background ==
The eatery opened in February 2023 in the space previously occupied by Landmarc. The executive chef is Nick Gaube. The eatery is known for its unusual and sometimes over the top creations such as, lemon cheesecake served in the shape of lemons, garlic babka, filet mignon topped with cacio e pepe ravioli, tiramisu ice cream cake, and whole roasted lobster and Calabrian campanelle for two. The interior space is designed by the Brooklyn situated studio GRT Architects. Luke Fortney in one of his pieces on Bad Roman for Eater calls a main part of the design a "250-seat dining room that looks a bit like a coked-out Ruby Tuesday".

Curbed held its 2023 NYC TikTokers dinner at the establishment. Kylie Jenner has noted it as one of her favorite spots for pasta.
