= New York Coliseum =

Convention center in New York City (1956–2000)

Coordinates: 40°46′06″N 73°58′58″W

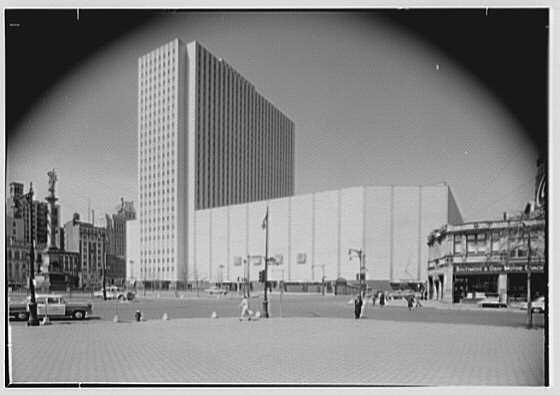
The Coliseum in April 1956, viewed from the southwest corner of Central Park, at Columbus Circle

The New York Coliseum was a convention center that stood at Columbus Circle in Manhattan, New York City, from 1956 to 2000. It was designed by architects Leon Levy and Lionel Levy in a modified International Style, and included both a low building with exhibition space and a 26-story office block. The project also included the construction of a housing development directly behind the complex.

The Coliseum was planned by Robert Moses, an urban planner and the chairman of the Triborough Bridge and Tunnel Authority (TBTA). In 1946, it was proposed to build a convention center within a new Madison Square Garden building at Columbus Circle. This plan was not successful, nor was another plan for the Metropolitan Opera House. After years of delays, the Coliseum was approved in 1953, and construction started in 1954. The Coliseum hosted its first exhibits on April 28, 1956, followed by hundreds of conventions over the next four decades. The Coliseum supplanted the Grand Central Palace as the city's main convention center until it was superseded in that role by the Javits Center, which opened in 1986.

The TBTA's successor, the Metropolitan Transportation Authority (MTA), started looking for buyers in order to raise money for its operations. Boston Properties attempted to negotiate a lease between 1987 and 1994. The site was ultimately bought by a joint venture between Time Warner and The Related Companies in 1998, and the Coliseum was demolished in 2000 to make way for the Time Warner Center (renamed the Deutsche Bank Center in 2021).

== Description ==
The 323,000-square-foot (30,000 m^{2}) Coliseum was located on the west side of Columbus Circle. It occupied the block from West 58th to West 60th Streets between Eighth and Ninth Avenues. One block of 59th Street was decommissioned to make way for the complex.

The Coliseum contained four exhibition floors, including a 150-foot (46 m)-square, three-story void for exhibiting large items, such as sailboats and airplanes. The exhibition space did not contain any windows; its exterior was instead sheathed in plain white stone. The space had three separate entrances and could host up to six shows at the same time. Nine elevators and five escalators were installed in this part of the building, as was a two-lane truck ramp. Upon the Coliseum's opening, one of the freight elevators was said to be larger than any other elevator in existence, except for the airplane elevators present on aircraft carriers. The attached office building had 26 stories and was covered in white and gray brick. The complex was designed by Leon Levy and Lionel Levy. The complex cost $35 million to build, of which $26.5 million came from toll revenues collected by the Triborough Bridge and Tunnel Authority (TBTA).

The sculptor Paul Manship was commissioned to design four plaques for the Coliseum. The four plaques depicted the federal, state, city, and TBTA seals. Just before the Coliseum was demolished, the MTA removed the plaques for restoration.

Christopher Gray of The New York Times criticized the complex as a "low point for New York's public buildings". He said that the visual relationship between the windowless convention space and the grid-shaped facade of the office building "was awkward at best". Gray quoted another magazine, Art News, as stating that the complex contained a "total lack of relation to its site". After the Coliseum's demolition was completed in 2000, Joyce Purnick of the Times wrote, "What was always wrong about the Coliseum was its original conception. It was, as an exhibition hall, broad and impenetrable, a wall of blond brick. There it sat at the gateway to Central Park—an unblinking barrier."

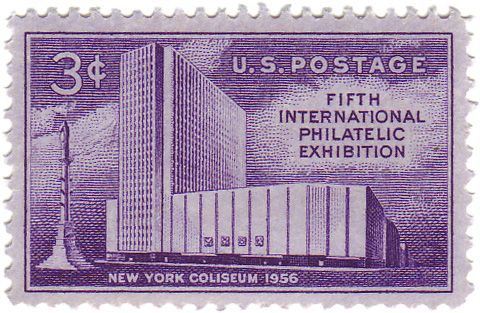
Coliseum commemorative stamp

A US postage stamp commemorates the Fifth International Philatelic Exhibition as well as the Coliseum.

== History ==
=== Planning ===
The Triborough Bridge and Tunnel Authority's chairman, Robert Moses, first envisioned a convention center for New York City in 1944. Separately, in 1946, the Madison Square Garden Corporation proposed building a large sports arena along the western edge of Columbus Circle between 58th and 60th Streets, supplementing the existing Madison Square Garden (MSG) ten blocks south. The nine-story MSG annex would include a 25,000- to 27,000-seat arena, a 200,000-square-foot (19,000 m^{2}) convention space, and a 2,000-car garage. The convention space would be the world's largest. The TBTA would build the new MSG building and issue bonds to finance construction, and the city would take over the building after the bonds were paid off. In this original plan, the structure would have been located above 59th Street. The cost of construction was projected at $25 million; the land itself was said to cost $5 million.

The plans were delayed in February 1947, when the New York State Assembly's Ways and Means Committee failed to act on a bill that would have authorized the construction of the new MSG building. Supporters of the project stated that New York City had already lost the opportunity to host several large expositions due to the inadequate facilities at the Grand Central Palace, the city's only convention center at the time. In April 1948, Governor Thomas E. Dewey signed a bill that authorized the MSG annex's construction. However, due to disagreements among the MSG Corporation's board of directors, the project was put on hold in April 1949. During this delay in the plans, several private interests purchased large tracts of land on the site of the proposed MSG annex. Negotiations resumed in October of that year, with the expectation that construction would begin in spring 1950. By this time, the project was known as the "Columbus Circle Coliseum". In The Power Broker, Moses biographer Robert Caro states that the Coliseum's name "reveals Moses' preoccupation with achieving an immortality conferred on the Caesars of Rome".

In May 1951, the city offered the Metropolitan Opera and New York Philharmonic a chance to build a new opera house and operate it tax-free on part of the Coliseum's land. The New York Times described it as Moses's "new approach" toward the project. At this point, the land for the Coliseum had still not been acquired. By July 1951, more than half the $1 million cost for the proposed Metropolitan Opera House's site had been raised. By January 1952, the opera had achieved $900,000 of the cost of acquisition, which had jumped to $1.2 million. However, the plan for a Metropolitan Opera House at Columbus Circle was dropped in March 1952. Moses later said that the problems surrounding the site included internal conflicts among the Metropolitan Opera's directors regarding whether the opera should simply rebuild its existing opera house.

The Columbus Circle Coliseum was included in the Columbus Circle Urban Renewal Plan, published in 1952. In April 1952, the Federal Housing and Home Finance Agency advanced $40,000 toward slum clearing. Slightly more than half of the plot was to contain an apartment complex so Moses could receive two-thirds federal funding for clearing the slums on the site. The two-thirds federal funding for slum clearing could only be approved by the Federal Housing Administration if at least half the site were used for housing. Thus, housing took up the western 51% of the block, facing Ninth and Columbus Avenues, while the Coliseum took up the eastern 49%, facing Columbus Circle. By October 1952, Moses said that builders were ready to start construction on the Coliseum, but he emphasized that the MSG arena was no longer part of the plan. In December of that year, the plan to build a convention center and two 12-story residential towers was submitted to the New York City Board of Estimate and Mayor Vincent R. Impellitteri. The Board of Estimate quickly voted to approve the Coliseum project because of an expected turnover in Housing and Home Finance Agency leadership, which in turn was occurring due to the election of President Dwight D. Eisenhower that year.

=== Construction and opening ===
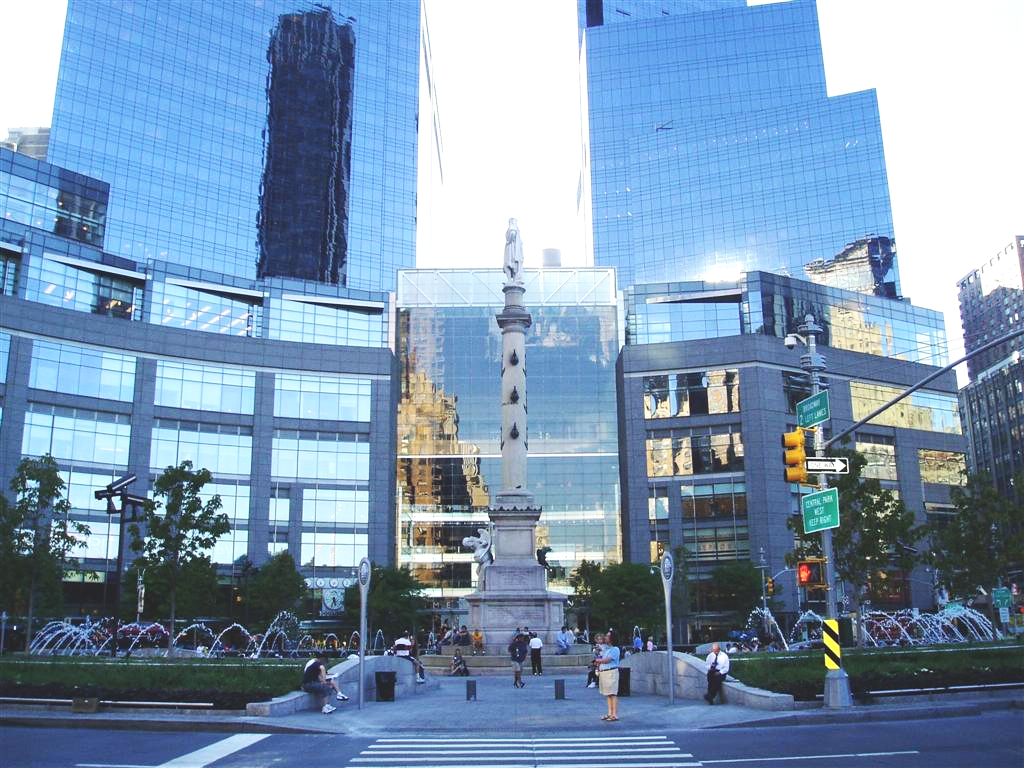
Looking west from Columbus Circle toward the superblock once occupied by the New York Coliseum, now occupied by the Deutsche Bank Center

As part of the Coliseum project, Moses condemned the area from West 58th to West 60th Streets on the west side of Columbus Circle. However, the start of construction was delayed by a lawsuit from a taxpayer who wanted an injunction on the acquisition. The Grand Central Palace held its last show in late 1953, and due to the delays in building the Coliseum, it was anticipated that New York City would not have a convention space for the following three years. An appeals court gave the city the right to acquire the land for the project in October 1953, and the city obtained the land in November of that year. The Coliseum project, as well as the related development of housing, was approved in December 1953. It replaced the Gotham National Bank Building as well as smaller tenement and retail buildings. In the original plan, there would have been a separate office building and convention center, but the two structures were combined in a late revision to the plan. There would also be a 900-space parking lot under the Coliseum.

The cornerstone for the Coliseum was laid on October 22, 1954. Seventy-five subcontractors from forty construction trades were hired to build the Coliseum. In May 1955, an accident occurred in which a 180-by-180-foot (55 by 55 m) component of the exhibition space collapsed while concrete was being poured into it. The accident injured 50 workers and killed one. A subsequent investigation found no evidence of criminal negligence.

The Coliseum opened on April 28, 1956, with three exhibitions: the New York International Auto Show, the National Photographic Show, and the International Philatelic Exhibition. One observer wrote of the new convention center, "The Coliseum is extraordinary in many ways. Its vastness must be seen—from the inside—to be believed". Ground was broken for the housing to the west of the Coliseum on May 1, 1956, three days after the center's official opening. It was complete by September 1957. The new housing development, called Coliseum Park, consisted of two 15-story buildings at 58th and 60th Streets with 590 units between them, as well as a 2-acre (0.81 ha) park separating the two buildings.

By the first anniversary of the Coliseum's opening, over three million people had visited the convention center. Additionally, 70% of the attached office building had been leased. The opening of the Coliseum, as well as other nearby projects such as a new tube for the Lincoln Tunnel, gave rise to a new zoning plan for the Far West Side of Manhattan. This rezoning allowed for a series of new developments in the formerly blighted Hell's Kitchen neighborhood. The number of renters in Hell's Kitchen also increased following the Coliseum's opening.

In 1959, a bilateral agreement was made between the United States and Soviet Union. As part of the agreement, the American National Exhibition was to be held in Moscow, and the Russians were to host the Soviet National Exhibition at the New York Coliseum from June 29, 1959, to late July 1959. Sputnik, the Soviet satellite launched in 1957, was a focal point amidst exhibits on Soviet industry and agriculture, as were musical and theatrical performances.

By 1967, the Coliseum had hosted 247 major events with a total of 24 million visitors. The Coliseum had a tax agreement with the city, wherein the city government would collect a portion of the TBTA's revenue rather than collect taxes on the Coliseum property. Within the first ten years of the Coliseum's opening, the city had collected almost $9.1 million from the TBTA.

Up to the end of 1986, the Coliseum hosted 1,246 events. Conventions held at the Coliseum included the New York International Auto Show; the International Flower Show; the International Home Expo; the New York Coliseum Antiques Show; the National Photographic Show; and the Philatelic Exhibition. Until the 1970s, the Coliseum was usually hosting one show at any given time. However, the Coliseum had a limited amount of space, and exhibitions started to move to other cities with larger convention centers. A larger replacement, the Jacob K. Javits Convention Center, was announced in 1979. One particularly notable event was when Nirvana played at the Coliseum in 1993.

=== Closure and demolition ===
The Javits Center effectively supplanted the Coliseum as the major exhibit space in New York City. By the time of the announcement of the Javits Center, the Coliseum had become dated and redundant. In 1984, the Metropolitan Transportation Authority (MTA), by now the parent of the Triborough Bridge and Tunnel Authority, announced that it was placing the property for sale. The MTA and the city jointly owned the property, and all proceeds would go to improving the MTA's transit systems. In 1985, the architect Moshe Safdie revealed his plans for twin 70-story-high towers at the site. Representatives for over 100 developers and architectural firms showed interest in the redevelopment of the Coliseum.

The plan received opposition from the community. Many community members expressed concerns that the proposal did not fit in with the mostly residential character of the surrounding neighborhood of Lincoln Square. They stated that the twin towers would cast long shadows over Central Park, across the circle. Critics also expressed concern about the project's impact on traffic around Lincoln Square. Notable opponents included the Municipal Art Society, which, led by former First Lady Jacqueline Kennedy Onassis, filed a lawsuit to try to stop the project from being approved.

The Coliseum was shuttered in 1986 with the expectation that it would be demolished as soon as an agreement with developers was finalized. Fourteen proposals for the redevelopment of the Coliseum site were submitted. Ultimately, there were two finalists: a joint venture between Boston Properties and Phibro-Salomon Inc., and another between New York Land Company and Kumagai Gumi. Boston Properties' plan was selected in July 1985 and unanimously approved by the New York City Council in December 1986. In 1987, the MTA agreed to sell the Coliseum and its office building to Boston Properties for $477.5 million. Under Boston Properties' plan, the Coliseum would be demolished by 1988 and replaced by a headquarters for Salomon Brothers, a subsidiary of Phibro-Salomon. Boston Properties would also have renovated the New York City Subway's 59th Street–Columbus Circle station for $40 million as part of the project. The new Salomon Brothers headquarters would have been called the "Columbus Center". The developer, Boston Properties CEO Mortimer Zuckerman, then entered negotiations with the MTA and the city. The MTA wanted a down payment, so Zuckerman placed a $5.7 million letter of credit for his portion of the sale, while Salomon Brothers paid the other $39.8 million.

Due to continuing opposition from the community, Zuckerman downsized the proposal so that the towers were 58 and 68 stories high. In January 1988, Salomon Brothers withdrew from the project due to the October 1987 stock market crash. After Zuckerman threatened to sue Salomon Brothers, they reached a settlement of between $55 million and $60 million. In December 1987, a state court ruled that the proposed building violated the city's own zoning ordinances and nullified the sale. New York City and Boston Properties renegotiated the deal to call for a 52-story structure with a reduced price of $357 million for the site. Boston Properties tapped David Childs to redesign the building. In the interim, the MTA, seeking to make some use of the site once the future of the Boston Properties site became unclear, reopened the Coliseum on an interim basis in 1992 for smaller events, primarily a thrice-a-year antiques show. Some homeless individuals also squatted at the building when it was abandoned.

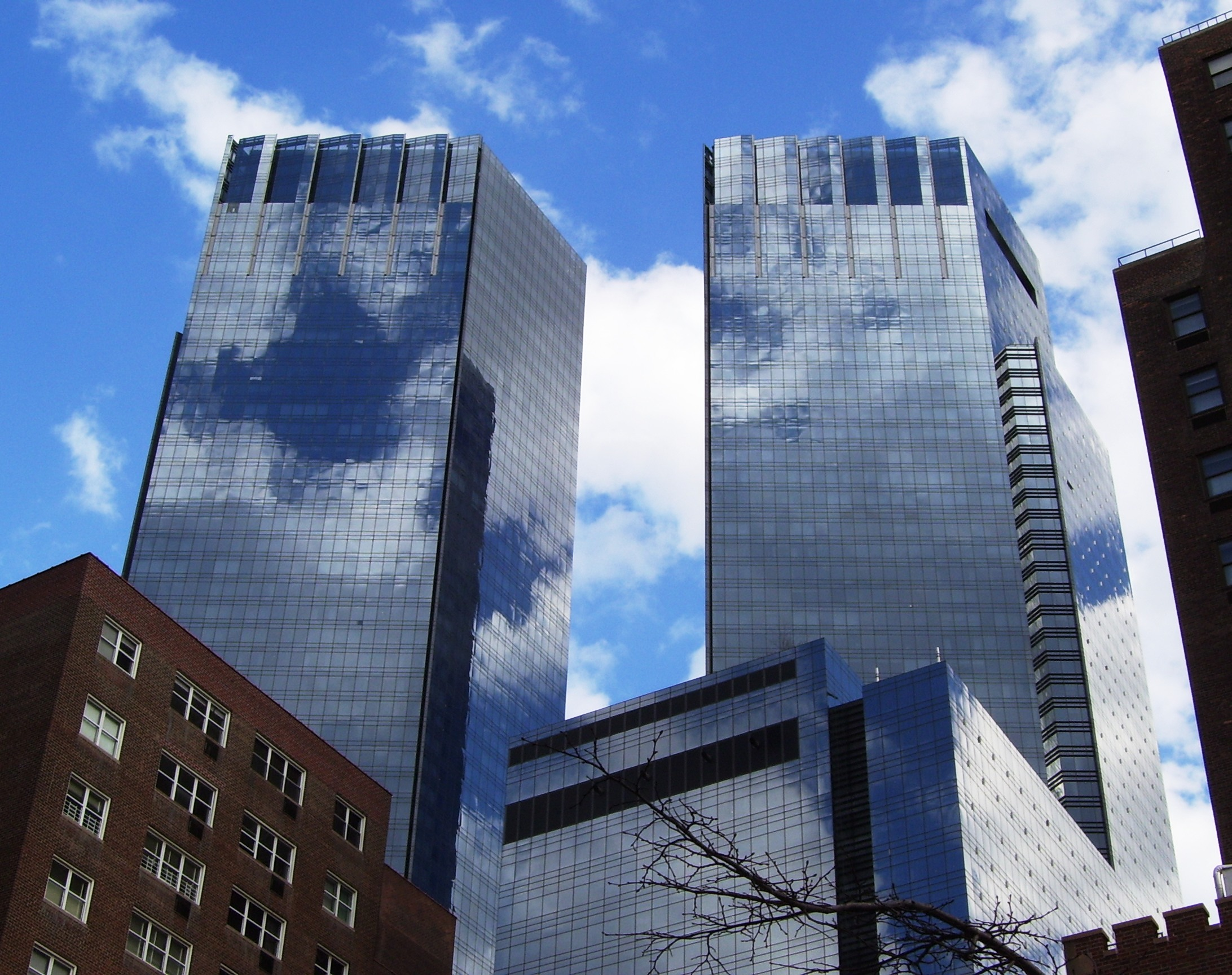
The Deutsche Bank Center, which replaced the Coliseum

The failure to close the sale of the New York Coliseum was having negative effects on the MTA's finances. In August 1990, the agency announced that several improvement projects worth $500 million would need to be delayed if the coliseum was not sold by the end of 1991. Zuckerman continued to negotiate with the MTA, but faced problems when Mayor David Dinkins refused to call Zuckerman's letter of credit until just before leaving office in 1993. In early 1994, newly elected mayor Rudy Giuliani requested that a third party appraise the site, which Zuckerman wanted to purchase for $100 million. While the third party determined that the New York Coliseum site was worth $57 million, MTA chairman Peter Stangl said that the site was worth $200 million.

By 1994, the sale had still not been finalized, and in April of that year, Giuliani requested a third-party appraisal of the site. If the contract was not signed that month, Zuckerman would lose his $33 million down payment. As a result, the real estate developer exercised an option for a 55-day postponement in signing the deal. In May 1994, Zuckerman proposed to buy the site for $80 million, less than a quarter of the original price. The MTA refused, saying that any price less than $100 million was unacceptable. The $80 million sale price was agreed-on in June. However, when the deadline for signing the contract passed in July 1994, Zuckerman still had not signed the contract, and negotiations between him and the MTA collapsed. By this time, the plans for Columbus Center had been reduced three times. Zuckerman lost $17 million as a result of the deal's cancellation, while the MTA was able to sever its strained relationship with Zuckerman. By October 1994, the MTA was deciding whether to keep using the Coliseum or to proceed with trying to find a buyer.

In the late 1990s, another attempt to sell the Coliseum was made, this time to an investment firm headed by Israel Englander, who proposed to build luxury apartments and a ballroom on the site. However, with the real estate market rebounding, a critical $50 million tax break was withdrawn by then-mayor Rudolph Giuliani (who saw a tax break for a property that would not draw permanent jobs to the site as unnecessary), at which point Englander's Millennium Partners walked away from the project. By 1997, there were nine bids for the redevelopment of the Coliseum site. At this point, the entire area around Columbus Circle was being redeveloped, but six separate government agencies were handling different parts of the process. The president of the Municipal Art Society said, "This is the last time in our lifetime that such an important chunk of Manhattan is going to be up for redesign and rebuilding. [...] 'This one has got to be done right. It can't be just another development."

In 1998, the MTA finally agreed to sell the property to a joint venture of Time Warner and The Related Companies for $345 million. Time Warner would use the land to build its world headquarters. Time Warner's proposed headquarters consisted of twin towers, but they were clad with glass and stood only 55 stories tall. The Coliseum closed for good in January 1998, and the building's plaques were removed in September 1999. A food market that had operated next to the Coliseum closed in October 1999, and the MTA began moving workers from the Coliseum to 2 Broadway the next month. Following interior demolition, the Coliseum and its attached office building were dismantled beginning in February 2000. The site was cleared by that June. During demolition of the Coliseum, two workers were injured in a partial collapse on June 2, 2000. The Time Warner/Related joint project (later the Time Warner Center, now the Deutsche Bank Center) stands on the Coliseum site.
