= The Shops at Columbus Circle =

Shopping mall in New York City

Coordinates: 40°46′5″N 73°58′58″W

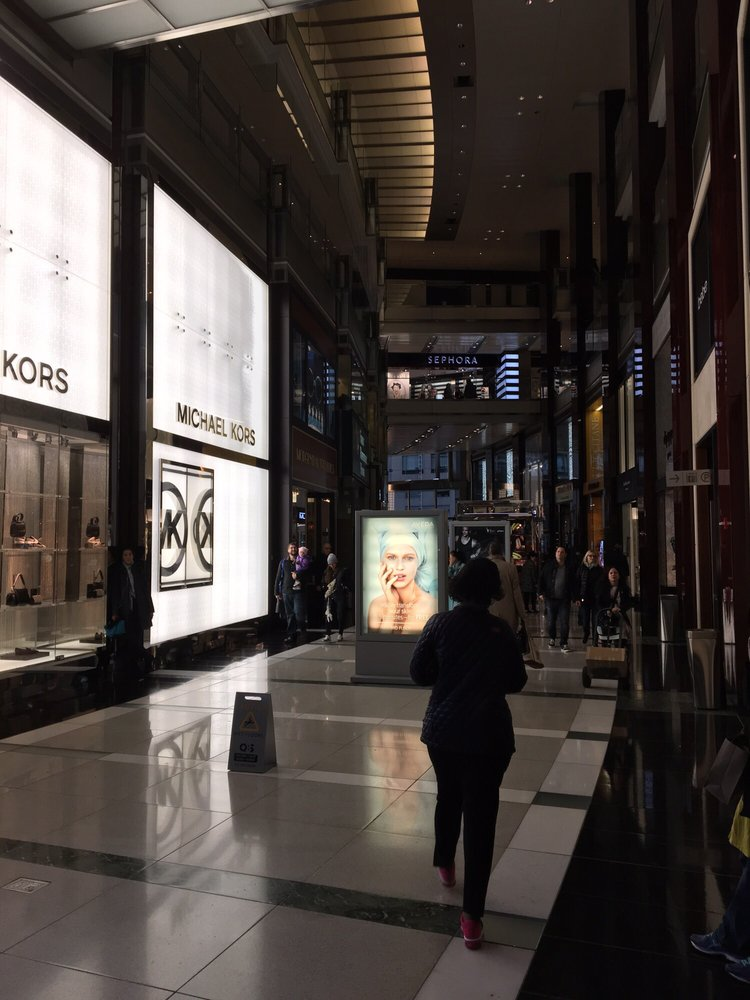
- Opened: 2003
- Floors: 5
- Public transit: at 59th Street-Columbus Circle (New York City Subway)
- Website: www.theshopsatcolumbuscircle.com

The Shops at Columbus Circle is an upscale shopping mall in Deutsche Bank Center, a skyscraper complex in Manhattan, New York City. It is located at Columbus Circle, next to the southwestern corner of Central Park.

Retail space designed by Elkus Manfredi Architects opened in February 2004 initially with 40 stores and 10 restaurants. The original tenant plan included J. Crew, Sephora, and Williams Sonoma. The shops also opened the largest Whole Foods Market at 59,000 square feet (5,500 m^{2}) and a flagship branch of Equinox.

== Tenants ==
The shopping mall includes Lululemon, H&M, Alo, Hugo Boss, Tumi, Diptyque, J.Crew and Stuart Weitzman.

Dining venues include the Michelin three-star Per Se by chef Thomas Keller, Masa by chef Masa Takayama, the East Coast flagship of Williams Sonoma, and a Whole Foods Market. It is owned by The Related Companies.

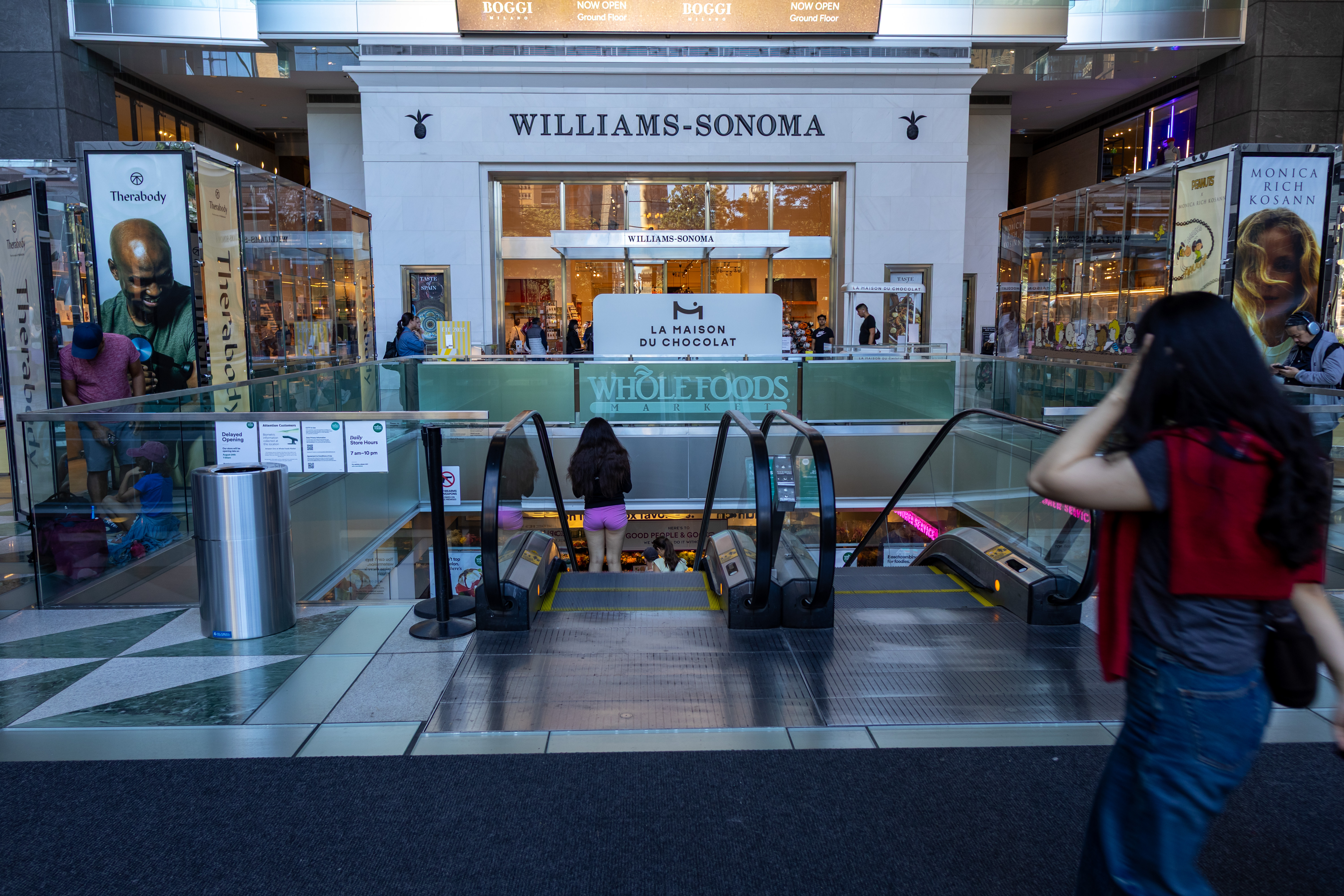
Entrance to the Whole Foods Market located at The Shops at Columbus Center, as seen in August 2025

When opened, the Whole Foods Market at Columbus Circle sold liquor from an attached room near the cash registers away from the main shopping aisles. However, this configuration was in violation of New York's liquor licensing laws, which require grocery stores to have a separate street entrance to their liquor departments, so in 2005 Whole Foods closed its liquor operations at Columbus Circle.
