= Deutsche Bank Center =

Skyscraper in Manhattan, New York

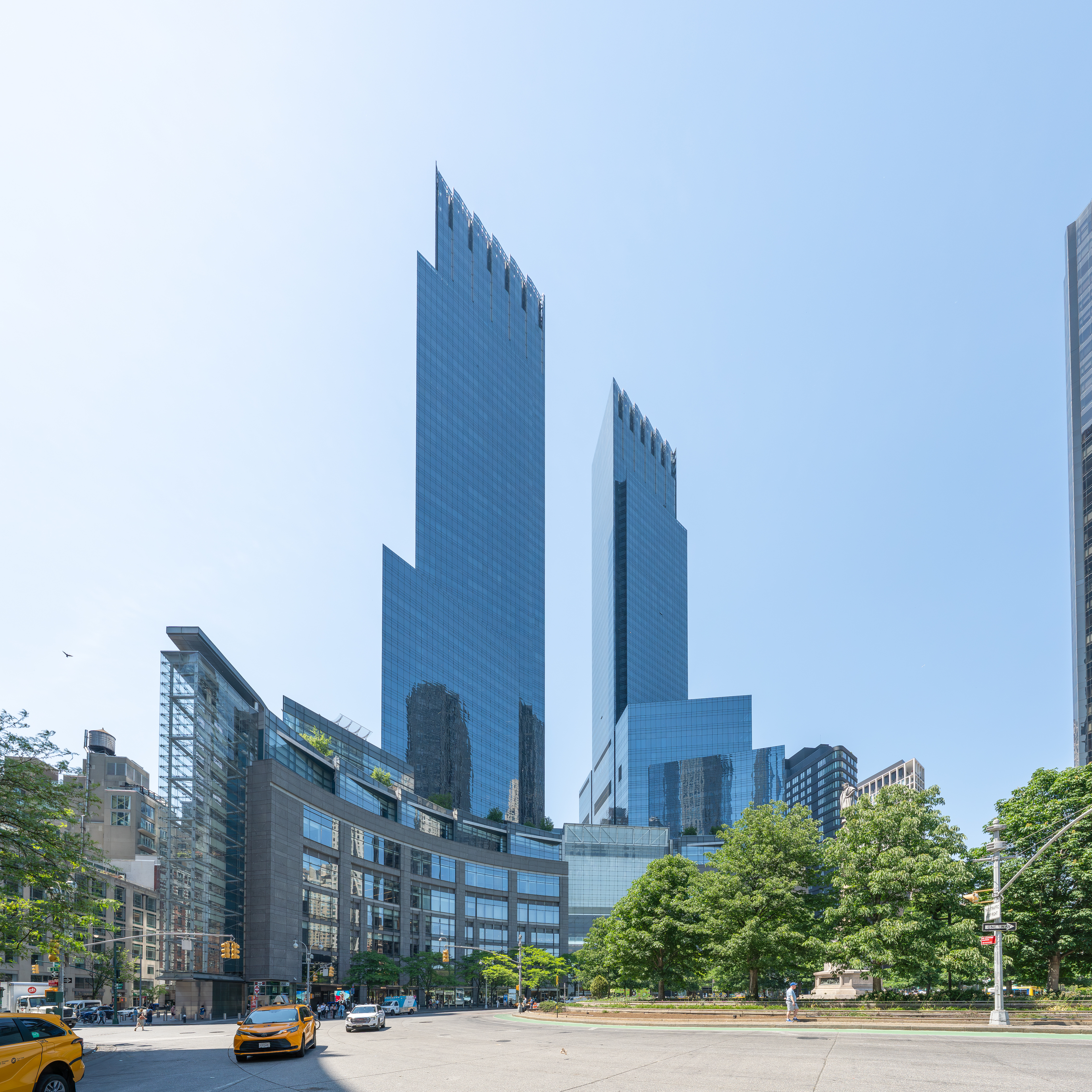
- Deutsche Bank Center in May 2026
- Former names: AOL Time Warner Center; Time Warner Center
- Alternative names: One Columbus Circle

General information
- Status: Completed
- Type: Mixed-use
- Location: 1 Columbus Circle, Manhattan, New York, U.S.
- Coordinates: 40°46′08″N 73°58′59″W
- Current tenants: Deutsche Bank
- Construction started: November 2, 2000
- Completed: 2003
- Opening: February 5, 2004
- Cost: $1.8 billion
- Owner: The Related Companies: Abu Dhabi Investment Authority; GIC Private Limited

Height
- Roof: 750 ft (230 m)

Technical details
- Floor count: 55

Design and construction
- Architects: David Childs, Mustafa Kemal Abadan of Skidmore, Owings and Merrill
- Structural engineer: WSP Cantor Seinuk; Cosentini Associates

Deutsche Bank Center (also known as One Columbus Circle and formerly Time Warner Center) is a mixed-use building on Columbus Circle in Manhattan, New York City, United States. The building occupies the western side of Columbus Circle and straddles the border between Hell's Kitchen and the Upper West Side. It was developed by The Related Companies and Apollo Global Management, and designed by David Childs and Mustafa Kemal Abadan of Skidmore, Owings & Merrill.

Deutsche Bank Center features 750-foot (230 m) twin towers, connected by a multi-story atrium. They are the tallest twin buildings in the United States. The building has a total floor area of 2.8 million square feet (260,000 m^{2}). It contains office space, residential condominiums, the Mandarin Oriental, New York hotel, and the Jazz at Lincoln Center entertainment venue. The Shops at Columbus Circle shopping mall is placed at the base of the building, with a large Whole Foods Market grocery store on the lower level.

The building was built on the site of the New York Coliseum, formerly New York City's main convention center. Plans for the project, then known as Columbus Center, were approved in 1998. Construction began in November 2000 and a topping-out ceremony was held in 2003; the project was known as AOL Time Warner Center during construction, but the "AOL" name was dropped before opening. Time Warner Center officially opened on February 5, 2004. Deutsche Bank replaced WarnerMedia as the anchor tenant of the 1.1-million-square-foot (100,000 m^{2}) office area in May 2021 and it was renamed Deutsche Bank Center.

== Site ==
The center is on the west side of Columbus Circle, on the border of Hell's Kitchen and the Upper West Side, in Manhattan, New York City, United States. It occupies an irregular plot of land bounded by 60th Street to the north, the Coliseum Park apartment complex to the west, and 58th Street to the south. The eastern boundary consists of Eighth Avenue, Columbus Circle, and Broadway from south to north. The land lot covers 149,560 square feet (13,895 m^{2}), with a frontage of 519.03 feet (158.20 m) on Columbus Circle and a depth of 492 feet (150 m). Deutsche Bank Center's primary address is 1 Columbus Circle. The building also uses the addresses 25 Columbus Circle for its south tower and 80 Columbus Circle for the north tower.

The building is near Trump International Hotel and Tower to the northeast, Central Park to the east, 2 Columbus Circle and 240 Central Park South to the southeast, and Central Park Place to the south. Entrances to the New York City Subway's 59th Street–Columbus Circle station, served by the 1, A, B, C, and D trains, are directly outside the building. As part of the construction of what was then Time Warner Center, the existing subway staircase was refurbished and an elevator was added to the subway entrance. Because the building did not include a zoning bonus, the developers did not need to fund a renovation of the subway station, as Hearst Communications was obligated to do when it built Hearst Tower one block south.

Deutsche Bank Center occupies the site of the New York Coliseum, which itself replaced two city blocks bounded by Columbus Circle, 60th Street, Ninth Avenue, and 58th Street. The Coliseum opened in 1956 as New York City's main convention center, being superseded by the Javits Center in the 1980s. Around the same time, the area around Columbus Circle was being redeveloped, in part because of the Coliseum's success. This prompted the Coliseum's owner, the Metropolitan Transportation Authority (MTA), to place the building up for sale in 1985. An agreement on the site's redevelopment was not finalized until 1998, and designs for the Coliseum replacement itself were not in place until 1999. This was in part due to disagreements over the site, as well as a weak economy in the late 1980s and early 1990s.

== Architecture ==
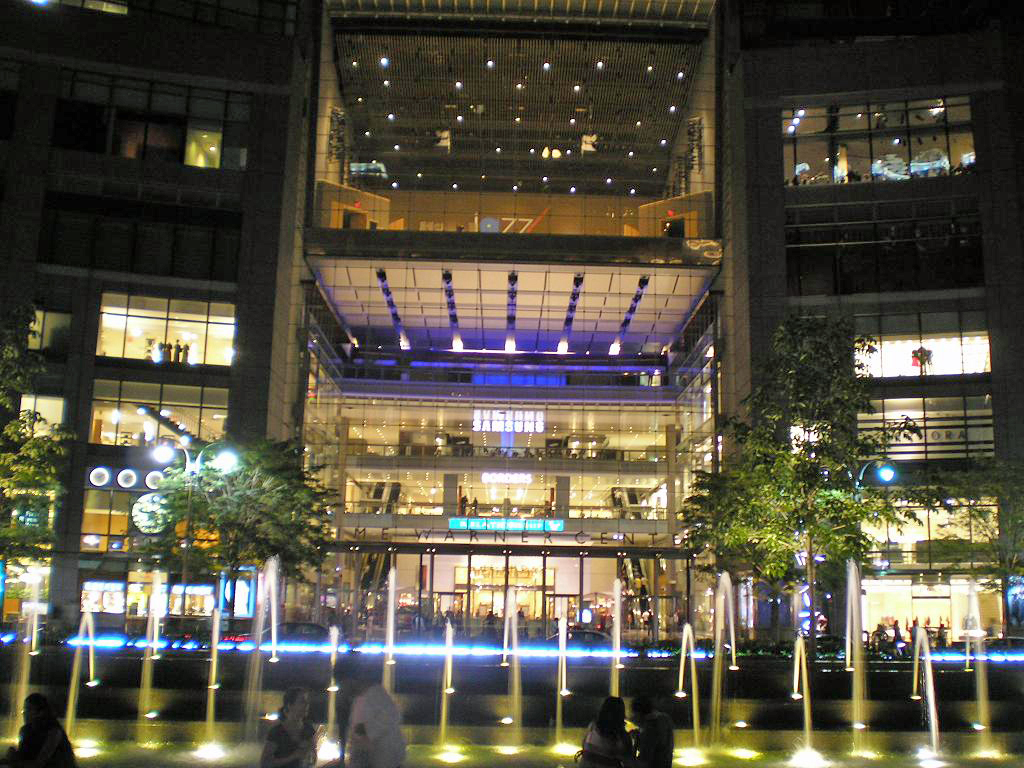
Time Warner Center as seen from Columbus Circle in 2006

Deutsche Bank Center was designed by David Childs of Skidmore, Owings & Merrill (SOM), working with T. J. Gottesdiener and Mustafa K. Abadan of the same firm. Specific portions of the interior were designed by different architects. AOL Time Warner, Apollo Global Management, Mandarin Oriental Hotel Group, Palladium Company, and the Related Companies were the developers. Stephen M. Ross, CEO of the Related Companies, said that SOM had been selected since they "create great architecture but also speak the language of business". Bovis Lend Lease was the construction manager for much of the interior, including mechanical systems. Another 80 to 100 subcontractors were also hired for different parts of construction.

Deutsche Bank Center includes towers to the north and south, joined at the base. The building is split into eight different ownership units: the basement parking garage, the Shops at Columbus Circle mall, Jazz at Lincoln Center's facilities, the original AOL Time Warner office space, the six other office stories, the condominium units in the north and south towers, and the Mandarin Oriental New York hotel. The building has about 2.8 million square feet (260,000 m^{2}) of interior space in total. About 668,700 square feet (62,120 m^{2}) of mechanical and underground space is not counted under zoning law. This gives a gross floor area of 2,101,990 square feet (195,281 m^{2}), which is close to the maximum area allowed under a floor area ratio of 15. Deutsche Bank Center uses a total of 20 acres (81,000 m^{2}) of glass, as well as 26,000 short tons (23,000 long tons; 24,000 t) of steel and 215,000 short tons (192,000 long tons; 195,000 t) of concrete.

=== Form and facade ===
The base of Deutsche Bank Center measures 480 feet (150 m) wide, as measured from north to south, by 434 feet (132 m) deep. The building is designed to face Central Park, with a general trapezoidal shape. Two towers with a parallelogram-shaped massing rise from the base. The towers are aligned with Broadway, which runs diagonally relative to the Manhattan street grid, while the base is aligned with the street grid. The space between the towers is on axis with 59th Street and Central Park South. The western and eastern facades of both towers are aligned 30 degrees counterclockwise from the axis of Eighth Avenue and Central Park West. Both towers are 55 stories tall with a roof height of 749 feet (228 m). (Note: For the north tower, see: For the south tower, see:) The pinnacle of each tower consists of a lantern measuring 60 feet (18 m) tall.

The base of Deutsche Bank Center contains a limestone facade with large window openings, which taper off into glass bands. The facade of the upper stories is clad with glass. There are small, projecting glass fins every 5 to 10 feet (1.5 to 3.0 m), which, from an angle, give the facade the appearance of a myriad of small shards. The glass panes were initially specified to be 6 millimeters (0.24 in) thick, but the architects changed the specification during construction to 8 millimeters (0.31 in) to stiffen the panes. The architects had originally intended for the glass to be light gray, but a darker shade was later specified. Atop the towers are glass parapets that absorb natural lights.

A multistory cable structure, facing 59th Street across Columbus Circle, serves as the entrance to an atrium between the building's twin towers. The structure consists of a grid of stainless-steel cables 7.5 feet (2.3 m) apart vertically and 4.5 feet (1.4 m) apart horizontally. Laminated-glass panels measuring 0.75 inches (19 mm) thick are placed within the cables. Measuring 86 feet (26 m) across and 149 feet (45 m) high, the cable structure was the largest in North America at the time of its completion. It was designed by James Carpenter Design Associates. According to Carpenter, the cable grid was intended "to be as delicate, transparent and diaphanous as possible" to allow simultaneous views into and out of the atrium. Abby Bussel, author of a book about SOM, wrote that the main entrance was intended to "project a civic face to the community" at night.

The southeast corner of the building, at Eighth Avenue and 58th Street, contains a triangular wedge-shaped glass structure measuring about 150 feet (46 m) tall. For the first months of the complex's existence, the glass structure was empty. As part of an agreement with the New York City government, the structure could not include advertising. Prow Sculpture, an art installation by David Rome, was then installed in the structure by 2004. This consists of 12 sets of 36 translucent panels, each supported by 121-foot-tall (37 m) vertical trusses. The panels each contain light-emitting diodes that change color once every few minutes. The panels also change color to display the time at 15-minute intervals. The lights can be illuminated in different colors to mark special occasions. The artwork requires 200 tons of air conditioning (equivalent to 2,400,000 British thermal units per hour [700,000 W]), as well as frequent cleaning.

=== Lower stories ===
The base of the building contains a steel superstructure with the Shops at Columbus Circle, Jazz at Lincoln Center, broadcast studios, and originally AOL Time Warner's headquarters. The towers' concrete superstructures rest above the base. Structurally, the building's base also includes the steel-framed lower sections of both towers. The steel frame extends 315 feet (96 m) high below the north tower and 349 feet (106 m) high below the south tower. The steel superstructure allowed the architects to use several column arrangements to accommodate the differing needs of each tenant, and it allowed the architects to create large, column-free spaces for hotel ballrooms, broadcast studios, and offices. Twenty-four entrances were originally provided at the base. To avoid interfering with the entrances and other open spaces, the building uses diagonal steel columns; concrete columns with stepped notches; and columns hanging from trusses.

The property's foundation is surrounded by a concrete cofferdam measuring 33 feet (10 m) deep and 630 feet (190 m) across. The building plans were technically an "alteration" to the New York Coliseum, since the building incorporates the Coliseum's underground parking garage. The parking garage, originally leased to the Central Parking Corporation, has 504 spots. The garage spans three stories and has sensors to monitor how many vehicles are parked in the garage. The garage also has a valet parking service. At ground level, the lobby for the south tower's residences is on 58th Street while the north tower's hotel and condominium lobby is on 59th Street. In addition, there are office lobbies on both 58th and 59th Streets; that on 58th Street originally served the Time Warner lobby.

==== Mall ====
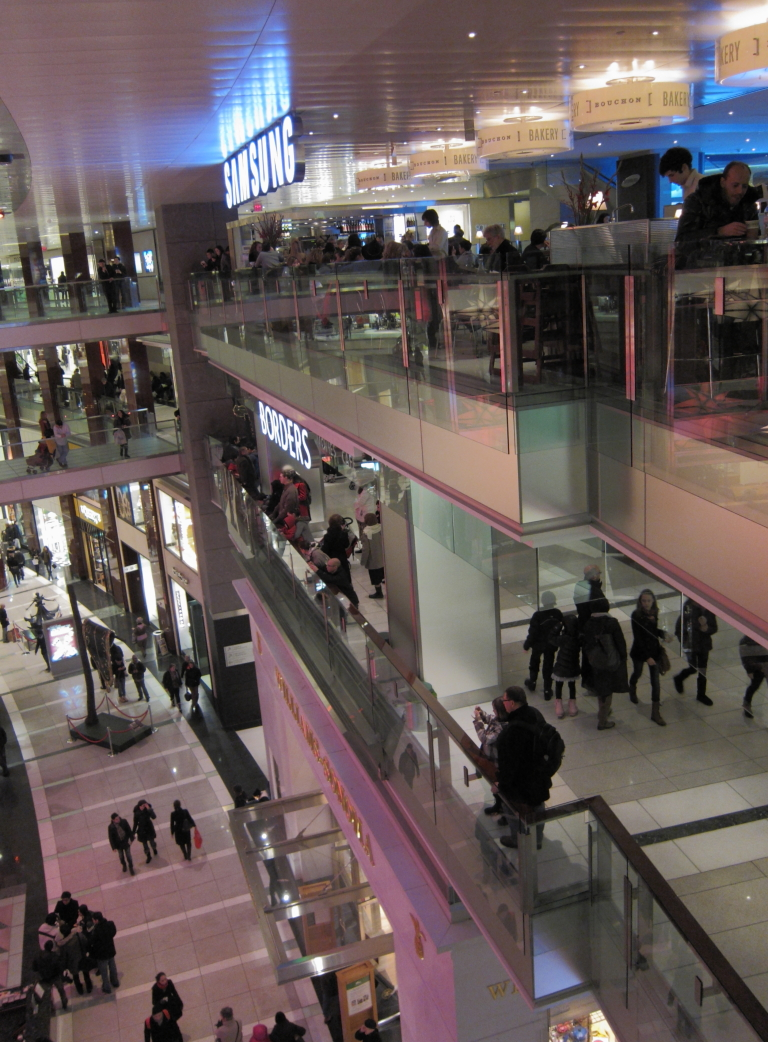
The lobby and shops in 2010, when the complex was known as Time Warner Center

Deutsche Bank Center has a four-story retail mall, the Shops at Columbus Circle, which opened in 2004 along with the rest of the complex. Designed by Elkus Manfredi Architects, it was known during planning as the Palladium. The mall's ground-floor tenants include designer shops and restaurants. Among the first retail tenants in the mall were a Whole Foods Market, as well as an Equinox gym, both in the basement. The third and fourth stories contain the Restaurant Collection, with two Michelin 3-star restaurants as of 2023 (Masa and Per Se), as well as other eateries such as Porter House New York and Bad Roman.

The mall is designed to follow the curve of Columbus Circle, measuring 450 feet (140 m) long. It contains an atrium 150 feet (46 m) high, leading west from Columbus Circle. This atrium, known as the "Great Room", is about 85 feet (26 m) wide and 120 feet (37 m) long with 10,000 square feet (930 m^{2}). A passageway, extending north and south from the atrium, covers 11,000 square feet (1,000 m^{2}).

==== Jazz at Lincoln Center ====
Within the base of Deutsche Bank Center is Frederick P. Rose Hall, a 100,000-square-foot (9,300 m^{2}) complex for Jazz at Lincoln Center, designed by Rafael Viñoly. It was proposed with two auditoriums, two rehearsal studios, a cafe, and a classroom. It consists of three venues. The Rose Theater, on the fifth floor, is the primary venue for Jazz at Lincoln Center, with 1,100 to 1,300 seats. The Appel Room, originally the Allen Room, is above the atrium with a large glass wall facing Columbus Circle, with space for up to 600 seats. Dizzy's Club is named after trumpeter Dizzy Gillespie and contains 140 seats. Jazz at Lincoln Center's space at Rose Hall also includes the Ertegun Atrium, facing Central Park, as well as the Nesuhi Ertegun Jazz Hall of Fame.

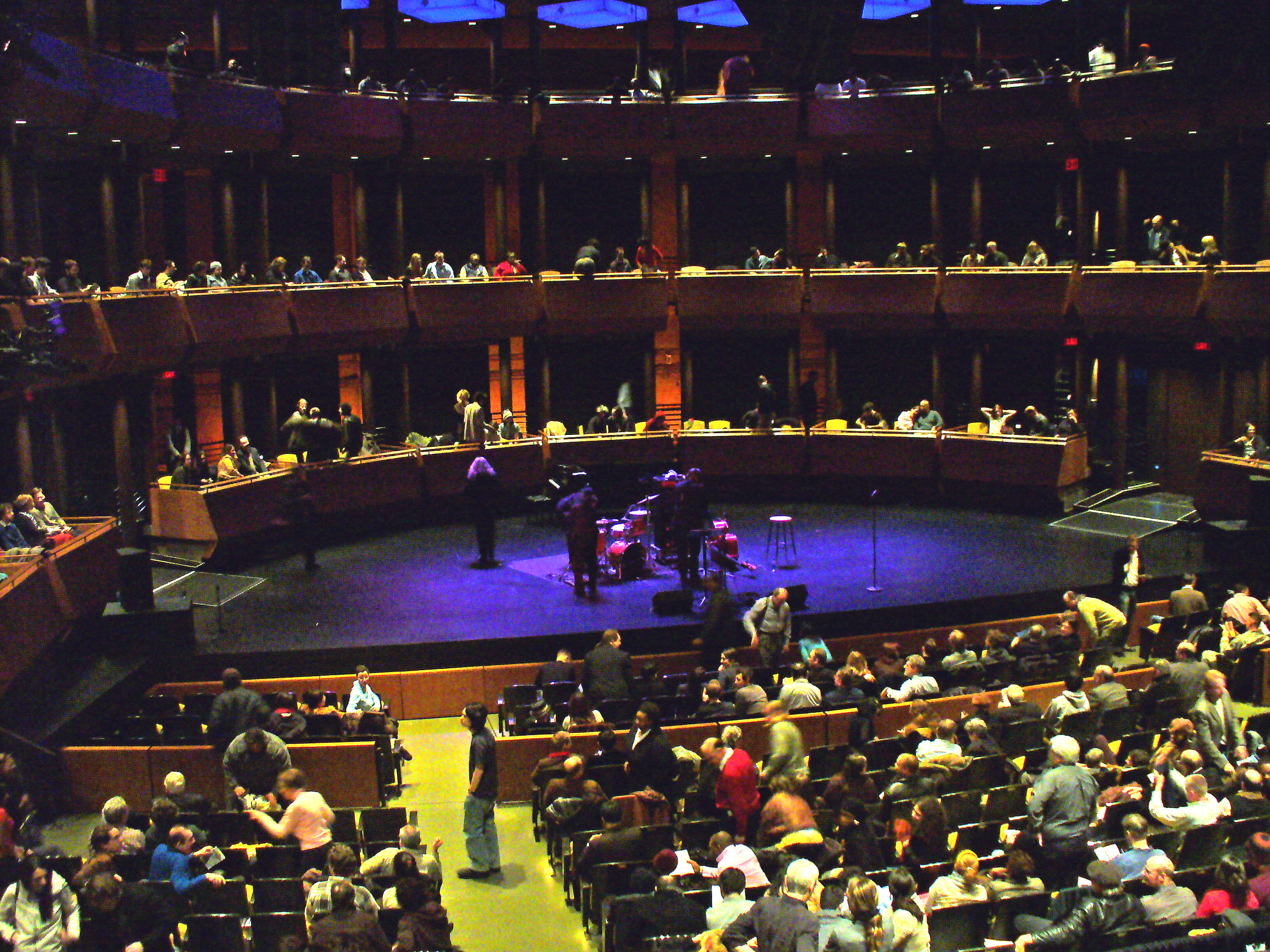
Rose Theater

Rose Theater is acoustically separated from the rest of Deutsche Bank Center. The auditorium, weighing 1,200 short tons (1,100 long tons; 1,100 t), is supported by 26 insulating gaskets on concrete footings. The gaskets consist of steel plates measuring 9.5 inches (240 mm) thick, between which are neoprene synthetic-rubber pads. There are also neoprene pads, measuring 2 to 3 inches (51 to 76 mm) thick, on the wall of the auditorium. Steven H. Sommer of Bovid Lend Lease, the hall's construction manager, compared the layout to "a small cardboard box in a larger cardboard box packed with Styrofoam peanuts".

In 2005, Jazz at Lincoln Center announced a partnership with XM Satellite Radio, which gave XM studio space at Rose Hall to broadcast both daily jazz programming and special events. Anderson Cooper's daytime talk show, Anderson, recorded in Jazz at Lincoln Center's Allen Room from 2011 to 2012.

==== Studios ====
The eighth floor of the north tower has studios originally designed for Time Warner's subsidiary CNN. The studios were designed by Kostow Greenwood Architects, with scenic design by Production Design Group. The CNN studios covered 240,000 square feet (22,000 m^{2}) or 250,000 square feet (23,000 m^{2}) on five full stories and portions of two others. The spaces covered floors four through nine. The complex consisted of three large "black box" studios, three smaller studios, two newsrooms, and four control rooms. The black-box studios overlooked the park, as did one of the newsrooms, designed for financial news subsidiary CNNfn.

The wide studio spaces required the columns to be spaced 60 feet (18 m) apart. To accommodate large overhead lights, SOM omitted alternating floor slabs so CNN's studios contained a floor-to-ceiling height of 27 feet (8.2 m). The studio floors were flattened to prevent camera equipment from vibrating, and thick insulating pads were placed under the floors. In addition, double walls were placed in each studio: an inner wall connecting to the studio floor and an outer wall connected to the rest of the building. Observation windows were placed near the top of the studio walls. The studios had their own power and backup control systems. A dedicated freight elevator was also installed so large props and pieces of sets could be carried into and out of the studios.

The CNNfn newsroom was designed so cameras could pan over the width of the room. Materials such as vinyl partitions and striped carpet tiles were selected according to how they looked on digital cameras. A feature of the CNNfn newsroom was double-tiered wooden oval desks, often shown in wide shots of the newsroom; the desks themselves were arranged in a curve. Kostow Greenwood redesigned the offices for CNNfn, later CNNMoney, in 2013. Among the changes were the addition of 10-foot-tall (3.0 m) office modules along the walls of some of the 27-foot-tall spaces. CNN's studios in Time Warner Center operated until the network relocated to 30 Hudson Yards in 2019.

==== Offices ====
At the building's completion, it had a total office area of approximately 1.1 million square feet (100,000 m^{2}). About 865,000 square feet (80,400 m^{2}) was used as the headquarters for Time Warner. (Note: The Time Warner offices are also cited as covering 860,000 square feet (80,000 m^{2}) and 864,000 square feet (80,300 m^{2}).) Time Warner's offices were designed by HLW International, though Perkins and Will oversaw the final fit-out of the office spaces. The Time Warner offices originally accommodated 1,600 employees on 17 floors in the building's southern section. Time Warner's former spaces are spanned by 45-foot (14 m) beams. Ten stories were designed as corporate offices in conjunction with Mancini Duffy; the corporate offices contained wooden millwork, as well as gray-and-gold finishes on the walls and carpets. Meeting rooms had curved walls with encaustic finishes and brightly colored accents. Floor spaces were arranged in a modular format, with three offices or four workstations to a module, and meeting areas and copying rooms were placed in uniform positions throughout each floors. According to Mancini Duffy's director of design, "mullions, frames, reveals, and the use of painted drywall, glass, and millwork" served to enhance the design of the office corridors.

There were originally 211,000 square feet (19,600 m^{2}) of offices not used by AOL Time Warner. (Note: The non-Time Warner offices are also cited as covering about 210,000 square feet (20,000 m^{2}).) The non-Time Warner offices covered six stories. Half of this space was initially occupied by Apollo and Related, two of the developers, after they had difficulty marketing the space; the other half was purchased by Time Warner. As of 2021, almost all of the building's office space, including both the Time Warner office space and the other space, is occupied by Deutsche Bank.

=== Upper stories ===
The apartments and hotel rooms on the upper floors have a concrete superstructure, since they did not need the large column spacing or small columns that a steel superstructure would provide. The concrete superstructures weigh 42,000 short tons (38,000 long tons; 38,000 t) each. There is a truss at the 17th floor of the north tower, 248 feet (76 m) above the ground, and at the 23rd floor of the south tower, 314 feet (96 m) above the ground. The trusses distribute the weight of the concrete above to the steel columns below; they also contain ducts, elevator rooms, and hallways between the emergency stairwells of the towers and the base. Each tower also has a concrete core measuring 40 by 140 feet (12 by 43 m) across, which extends to the layer of Manhattan schist below the building. The cores are up to 2 feet (0.61 m) thick at the base.

==== Hotel ====
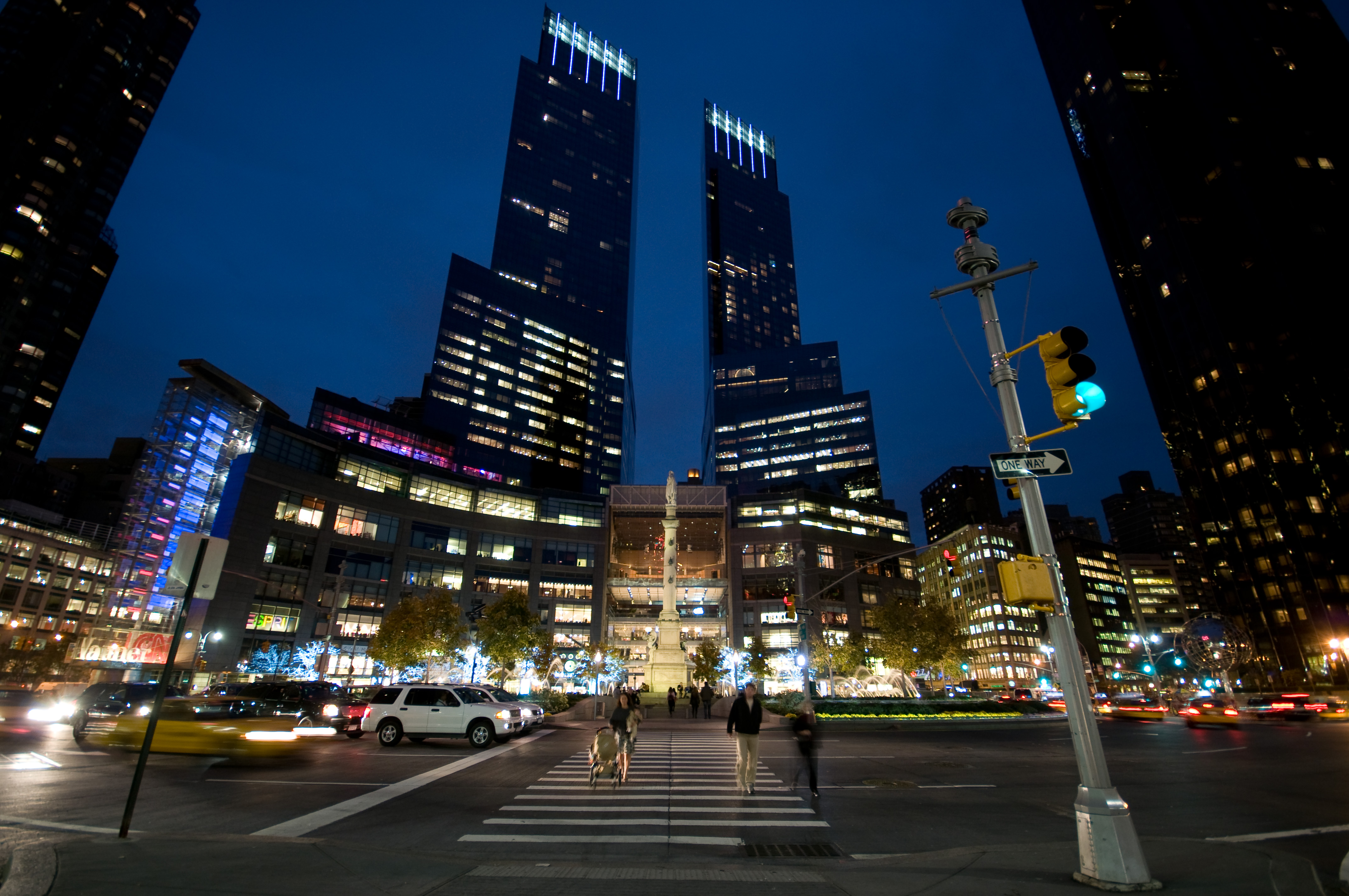
View from the east side of Columbus Circle

The north tower contains the Mandarin Oriental New York hotel, designed by Brennan Beer Gorman. The hotel contains 248 units in total, (Note: The hotel was also cited as having 250, 244, or 251 units.) composed of 202 guestrooms and 46 suites. The Mandarin Oriental New York spans floors 35 through 54, taking up 290,000 square feet (27,000 m^{2}) in Deutsche Bank Center. The hotel in general is designed in an Art Deco-inspired Asian contemporary style. The interior decorations were mostly created by Hirsch Bedner Associates, except for the Asiate restaurant, which was designed by Tony Chi. As of 2022, Reliance Industries owns a majority stake in the hotel.

The only entrance to the hotel is from 60th Street, where there are elevators to the hotel lobby. The ground-floor vestibule, designed as an ellipse, contains a glass chandelier by Dale Chihuly. Floor 35 contains the hotel lobby, the Asiate restaurant, and the MObar lounge. Also in the hotel is a two-story, 14,500-square-foot (1,350 m^{2}) spa. There is also a fitness center with a 75-foot-long (23 m) lap pool overlooking Central Park, as well as banquet rooms and ballrooms. Each of the guest rooms has a different set of decorations with Asian artwork and complex color schemes, as well as full-height windows. The layouts of the different hotel suites also vary.

==== Residences ====
Both towers contain residences, though they begin 24 stories above ground in the south tower and 37 stories above ground in the north tower. The north-tower residences are marketed as the Residences at Mandarin Oriental, while the south-tower residences are marketed as One Central Park, despite the fact that there is no street named Central Park. (Note: One Central Park West is the address of the Trump International Hotel and Tower to the north.) There are 66 residences in the north tower, (Note: Emporis cited the north tower as having 65 residences, and The Skyscraper Center cited the north tower as having 66 residences.) (Note: The number of residences varies slightly between sources because some residences were combined after the building was completed.) occupying sixteen stories. The residents of the north tower are given access to the Mandarin Oriental New York's amenities, being treated as if they were permanent guests of the hotel. These include spa and health club access as well as room service. The south tower has 133 or 134 residences, occupying twenty-nine stories. The condominiums have multiple entrances, including through the hotel, garage, and mall.

Ismael Leyva Architects designed the One Central Park residences, with furnishings by Thad Hayes. Leyva's furnishings include granite floors and counters, as well as marble tiles and appliances. The residential condominiums all have ceilings measuring 10 to 12 feet (3.0 to 3.7 m) high, with full-height windows providing views of the Hudson River to the west. Four different floor plans are used in the towers, and the spaces are spanned by 20-foot (6.1 m) beams.

The top stories of each tower are marketed as floor 80, though this story is actually the 53rd-story penthouse. The tops of each tower are designed with five full-story penthouse condominiums, measuring 8,400 square feet (780 m^{2}) and spanning a full floor. Unlike the other residences, the penthouses were originally offered as unfurnished spaces. Related Companies CEO Stephen Ross had occupied one of the full-story penthouses in the south tower until he sold it in 2023.

=== Mechanical features ===
Deutsche Bank Center includes a system of four emergency diesel generators for the residential tenants, each capable of 2 megawatts (2,700 hp). The base is powered by two diesel generators, also capable of 2 megawatts (2,700 hp). There is also a 1-megawatt (1,300 hp) uninterruptible power system that runs at all times. The backup generation system powers three elevators, as well as lighting in each hallway and apartment intercoms, in case of emergencies. Two service rooms were installed by Zwicker Electric. The heating, ventilation, and air conditioning system was automated, increasing its efficiency by 10 to 15 percent.

As part of the construction of Time Warner Center, its developers spent $21 million on technological advances. From the building's opening, the entirety of Time Warner Center was equipped with Wi-Fi, which at the time was still relatively uncommon in New York City buildings. A direct Ethernet connection was also included in the building when it was built, and each residence had an in-house internet phone service. In addition, residents received a notebook computer that served as their "digital concierge", where they could look up the building's restaurants, stores, and entertainment areas. The security screening systems at the elevators contained fingerprint readers. While the Wi-Fi services were available to visitors for a fee, the other tech services were only offered to residents and Mandarin Oriental hotel guests. Time Warner provided internet service for its own office space, but the residences and hotel rooms were served by RCN's network instead, because RCN service was less expensive than Time Warner service.

== History ==
=== Planning ===
After putting the Coliseum up for sale in 1985, the MTA received numerous bids for the redevelopment of the site. Mortimer Zuckerman's Boston Properties won the bidding contest, with plans to erect a headquarters for Salomon Brothers on the site, to be designed by Moshe Safdie. The community heavily opposed Zuckerman's initial plan, and the sale was nullified in 1987, with Salomon Brothers withdrawing from the project.

==== Competing plans ====
New York City and Boston Properties first hired David Childs in 1987 to design the Coliseum replacement, to be known as Columbus Center. Childs's initial plan, released in June 1988, called for a set of brick-and-glass towers rising as high as 850 feet (260 m). Similar to what would ultimately be built, the complex would have been composed of twin towers. Childs's plan faced heavy opposition from the community, leading to a redesign of the project. His second proposal was published in April 1988, with a twin-towered complex rising 752 feet (229 m), as well as a pedestrian bridge connecting the two towers. This plan, too, faced political opposition and lawsuits. Following the prolonged delays, Zuckerman and the MTA severed negotiations for the site in 1994. Related CEO Stephen Ross had proposed converting the Coliseum into a Kmart store, though nothing came of that plan. As a result, Ross contacted his friend, Kenneth A. Himmel, to devise a proposal for the site.

Planning for Columbus Center restarted in May 1996, with the MTA outlining several criteria for the shape of the proposed development, (Note: The design stipulation was that the complex's eastern wall had to follow Columbus Circle and be between 85 and 150 feet (26 and 46 m) tall. If there were two towers, they had to be separated by at least 65 feet (20 m) and could not be taller than 750 feet (230 m).) as well as a stipulation that the winner could not seek tax breaks. The city and MTA received nine proposals for the site that November. The Municipal Art Society displayed models of these proposals to gauge public opinion for the project. By May 1997, the city and MTA had selected five finalists: Related Companies, Trump Organization, Tishman Speyer, Bruce C. Ratner & Daniel Brodsky, and Millennium Partners. New York state officials tentatively considered selecting Millennium Partners' bid that July, to be designed by James Polshek. To the surprise of the developers submitting the bids, New York City mayor Rudy Giuliani announced he would revoke a tax break that he had promised to give to the winning bidder. Giuliani also threatened to block any potential sale of the Coliseum unless the project contained a theater of 1,000 to 2,000 seats for Lincoln Center. The mayor's demand for a theater had hitherto been unknown to the public, but Lincoln Center executives expressed interest in the proposal.

In February 1998, the city and state agreed that the new building would have a 1,100-seat concert hall for Jazz at Lincoln Center, as well as rehearsal rooms and educational spaces. The facility would cost $40 to $45 million, of which Jazz at Lincoln Center would raise $20 million and the city would raise $18 million. The developers were asked to resubmit their bids. That April, Time Warner partnered with the Related Companies, with plans to move CNN's New York City offices and NY1 broadcast studios to the development if Related's bid was successful. Ross and Himmel had convinced Time Warner CEO Richard D. Parsons the previous year to join the project. The joint bid was $45 million less than the high bid offered by Trump, though government officials preferred Millennium's and Related's twin-tower plans to Trump's single slab. Nevertheless, city officials were mainly considering Millennium's and Related's bids by June 1998. Millennium had proposed two luxury hotels and 450 residential condominiums, while the city government backed Related's bid because of Time Warner's involvement. By then, Childs, who had designed Related's proposal, had designed five separate plans for the site.

==== Plan selection and finalization ====
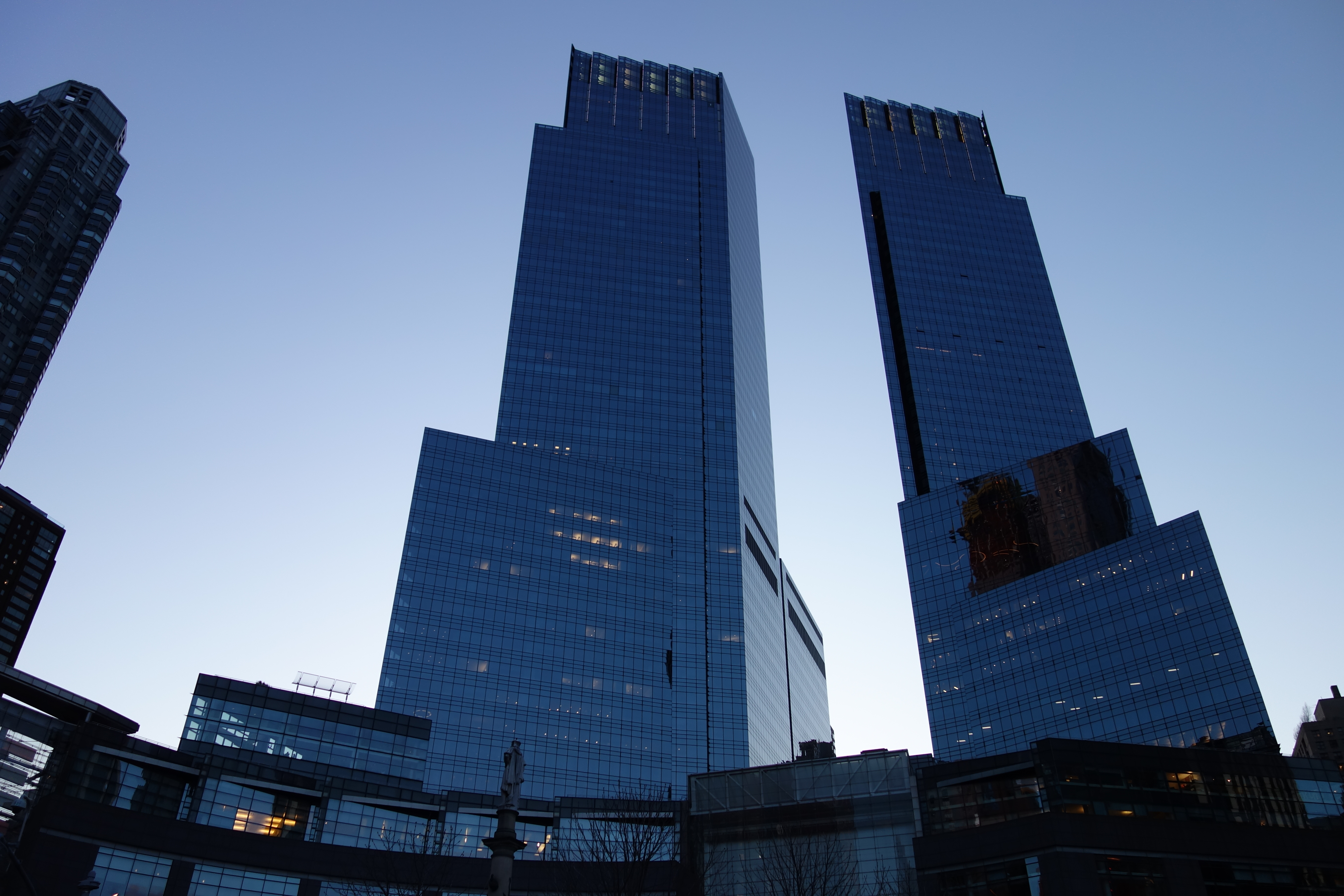
The complex seen at dusk in 2018

The city selected Time Warner and Related's $345 million bid in late July 1998. Childs was again hired to design the building, which would contain 425 hotel rooms, 375 condos, an auditorium for Jazz at Lincoln Center, and a 12-screen movie theater. There would also be a shopping mall, office space for Time Warner's headquarters, and studio space for CNN and NY1. The proposal called for a pair of towers, separated by an atrium aligned with the axis of 59th Street. Unlike in earlier plans, the towers were only 55 stories tall, had a glass facade, and ran along the circumference of Columbus Circle, with the towers' sides running parallel to Broadway's diagonal route through the circle. Apollo Global Management, which would issue financial capital for the development, was to be a co-owner alongside Related. The Palladium Company, jointly owned by Himmel and Related, would operate the retail space at the building. The developers likened the planned development to Rockefeller Center.

The MTA quickly approved the plans for the site. The Coliseum was demolished starting in September 1999 with the removal of plaques that had hung on the Coliseum's facade. While the Coliseum's demolition was ongoing, the Columbus Center project was still undergoing design changes. As late as February 2000, when the Coliseum's interior had been demolished, SOM, Related, and the city were still negotiating over details such as how much stone the facade should have. There were also disagreements over the distance between the building's twin towers, which was originally only 65 feet (20 m), as well as the extent to which the Jazz at Lincoln Center performance space should be recessed from Columbus Circle. By the time the Coliseum's exterior was demolished in June 2000, the structural steel had already been ordered. By then, even Childs had become exasperated with the delays, and the developers were ready to construct the building based on the interim plans, with which none of the involved parties were satisfied. Childs, working with T. J. Gottesdiener and Mustafa K. Abadan, proposed a pair of glass-clad parallelograms, which officials approved.

Childs announced his revised scheme at the end of June 2000. The building would be called the AOL Time Warner Center, in advance of the merger between AOL and Time Warner. The building was planned to be about 2.5 million square feet (230,000 m^{2}), including mechanical space. The same month, General Motors Acceptance Corporation (GMAC) agreed to provide $1.3 billion for the building's construction, believed to be the largest construction financing ever for a real estate development in New York City at the time. GMAC's financing came with a $1.1 billion senior loan and $200 million in mezzanine financing. The remainder of the $1.7 billion development cost would come from equity of Apollo, Related, AOL Time Warner, and the Mandarin Oriental Hotel Group. Including furnishings, the building was expected to cost $2.2 billion. Time Warner had paid $150 million upfront for the right to occupy the development. City officials had indicated that Time Warner would receive a large tax abatement for the project, but the New York City Department of Finance ruled in 2001 that the project was ineligible for such incentives under the 1996 request for proposals. Further tweaks were made to the design, including reducing the hotel from 400 to 251 rooms to allow for the construction of office space.

=== Construction ===
==== 2000 and 2001 ====
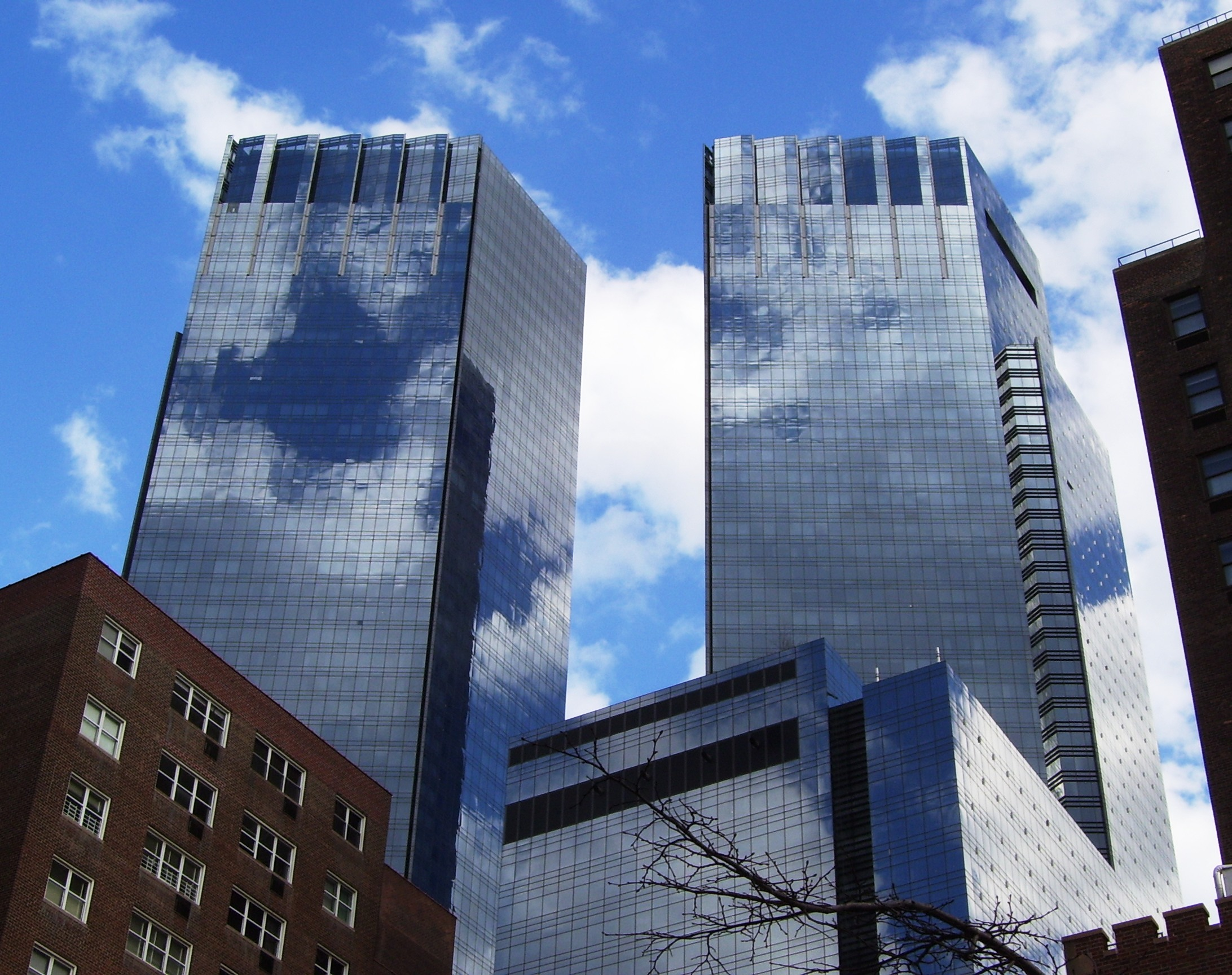
The top of the towers as seen from Tenth Avenue

A groundbreaking ceremony for the building occurred on November 14, 2000. At the time, the project was planned to employ 2,300 workers. Bovis Lend Lease was hired as general contractor based on a guaranteed maximum price at-risk contract, while Insignia/ESG was hired as the leasing agent for AOL Time Warner Center. By early 2001, the first large retail tenant had leased space in the building's mall, and the developers were interviewing restaurateurs to operate six eateries in the mall. That June, Central Parking was hired to run the three-story parking garage in the complex's basement. The condominiums went on sale in August 2001. Ross was planning to market some of the higher-story condominiums at between $4,000 and $5,000 per square foot ($43,000 and $54,000/m^{2}), which would make these apartments the most expensive in New York City by far. The condos ranged from $1.8 million for a two-bedroom unit to $35 million for a penthouse unit.

Plans for the 12-screen movie theater in Related's winning bid were scrapped by 2001. By mid-2001, the building had grown to about 2.8 million square feet (260,000 m^{2}), drawing the consternation of neighborhood groups who opposed the project. One such group, the Committee for Environmentally Sound Development, stated that AOL Time Warner Center was 33 percent larger than what was approved in an environmental impact statement in 1997. Other opponents, like City Councilwoman Ronnie Eldridge, wished to know why construction plans for the center had been filed as an alteration to the Coliseum, rather than as a new building. The Committee for Environmentally Sound Development filed a lawsuit against the project. While a New York Supreme Court judge ruled against the group in December 2001, the judge noted that a government agency still had to ensure AOL Time Warner Center did not exceed its maximum size.

Following the September 11 attacks on the World Trade Center in Lower Manhattan later in 2001, work on AOL Time Warner Center was slowed during the rescue and recovery effort, as many skilled workers had left the job to help with the rescue effort at the World Trade Center site. Additionally, since many roads into Manhattan were closed after the attacks, concrete deliveries were delayed, prompting concerns that the building's construction would also be held up. Despite the attacks, the Time Warner complex had reached 19 stories by the end of 2001. Even though a few prospective buyers had withdrawn, forty apartments had sold for a cumulative $200 million between September and December 2001. These included Sandie N. Tillotson, who bought the top floor of the north tower for $30 million shortly after the attacks, then a record for a condominium. Five retailers also leased space in the months after the attacks. To address security concerns, the architects strengthened AOL Time Warner Center's security features at entrances to garages and loading docks. The architects also increased the strength of the steel and added backup generators for the elevators.

==== 2002 and 2003 ====
By early 2002, a thousand workers were employed in the construction of the superstructure. Several officials, including mayor Michael Bloomberg, signed a steel beam that February to mark the topping-out of the lower floors' steel superstructure. A speech was given to honor workers who helped with the September 11 recovery effort. By then, sixty of the residential units had been sold. The Related Companies did not reduce its apartment prices, even as the attacks resulted in a decline in condominium sales citywide. Eighty percent of the retail space had been leased by mid-2002, as was forty percent of the residential units. At the time, AOL Time Warner's stock value was declining, and the company reportedly planned to sublease some space, which executives believed the company could not fully occupy. New York magazine compared AOL Time Warner Center to a situation where "your marriage is a wreck, you hate each other, everybody thinks you should get divorced, and yet you’re still building a lavish new home together."

During construction, Bovis Lend Lease received several notices of minor construction violations from the New York City Department of Buildings. During a heavy windstorm in September 2002, a piece of debris flew off the construction site, injuring a carpenter and two passersby. The carpenter ultimately died of his injuries, and a forklift driver was also killed on the eighth floor that year. In October 2002, California pension fund CalPERS and MacFarlane Partners offered to buy a half-ownership stake in the retail space, the office space not occupied by AOL Time Warner, and the center's parking structure. The sale to CalPERS and MacFarlane was finalized in February 2003, with the partners receiving a 49.5 percent stake; the stake was estimated at $500 million. That year, the Department of Finance valued AOL Time Warner Center at $820 million, a 275 percent increase from the previous year's valuation of $220 million. The construction process continued to experience difficulties; in April 2003, a fire damaged the fourth through seventh stories, including part of Jazz at Lincoln Center's future space. There were also thirty-nine open construction violations by late 2003, when around sixty percent of the condos had been sold.

AOL Time Warner, facing further financial setbacks, was compelled to reduce some costs at the new headquarters, including canceling plans for a technology lab. By September 2003, the company had voted to rebrand itself as Time Warner, with the building to be known simply as "Time Warner Center". Despite Time Warner's problems, in the two years after the September 11 attacks, residential prices at Time Warner Center were increased five times. Architectural Digest hired twenty-three developers to decorate one room each on floor 73, then held a fundraiser in these rooms in October 2003. The rooms were decorated for free and were left in place for six months so the remaining 77 apartments could be sold. Though most of the office space was to be occupied by Time Warner, there was no interest in the remaining office space. This led Apollo Real Estate and the Related Companies to occupy half of the vacant space, with Time Warner buying the rest for its subsidiaries. The difficulty in leasing the space was in part because the developers felt the offices were best suited for media outlets that would compete with Time Warner.

=== Time Warner use ===
Time Warner Center was the first major building to be developed in Manhattan after the September 11 attacks, and its development had directly resulted in an increase in nearby land values even before its completion. AOL Time Warner sought four companies to sponsor the new building, one each in the electronics, technology, automotive, and financial-services segments; the sponsors would have retail or exhibit space in the building. The first sponsor, electronics company Samsung, signed an agreement in mid-2003. Lincoln Motor Company was the automotive sponsor, while First Republic Bank was the financial-services sponsor. At the end of 2003, Credit Suisse First Boston provided $620 million to refinance part of the development's construction loan.

==== Opening ====
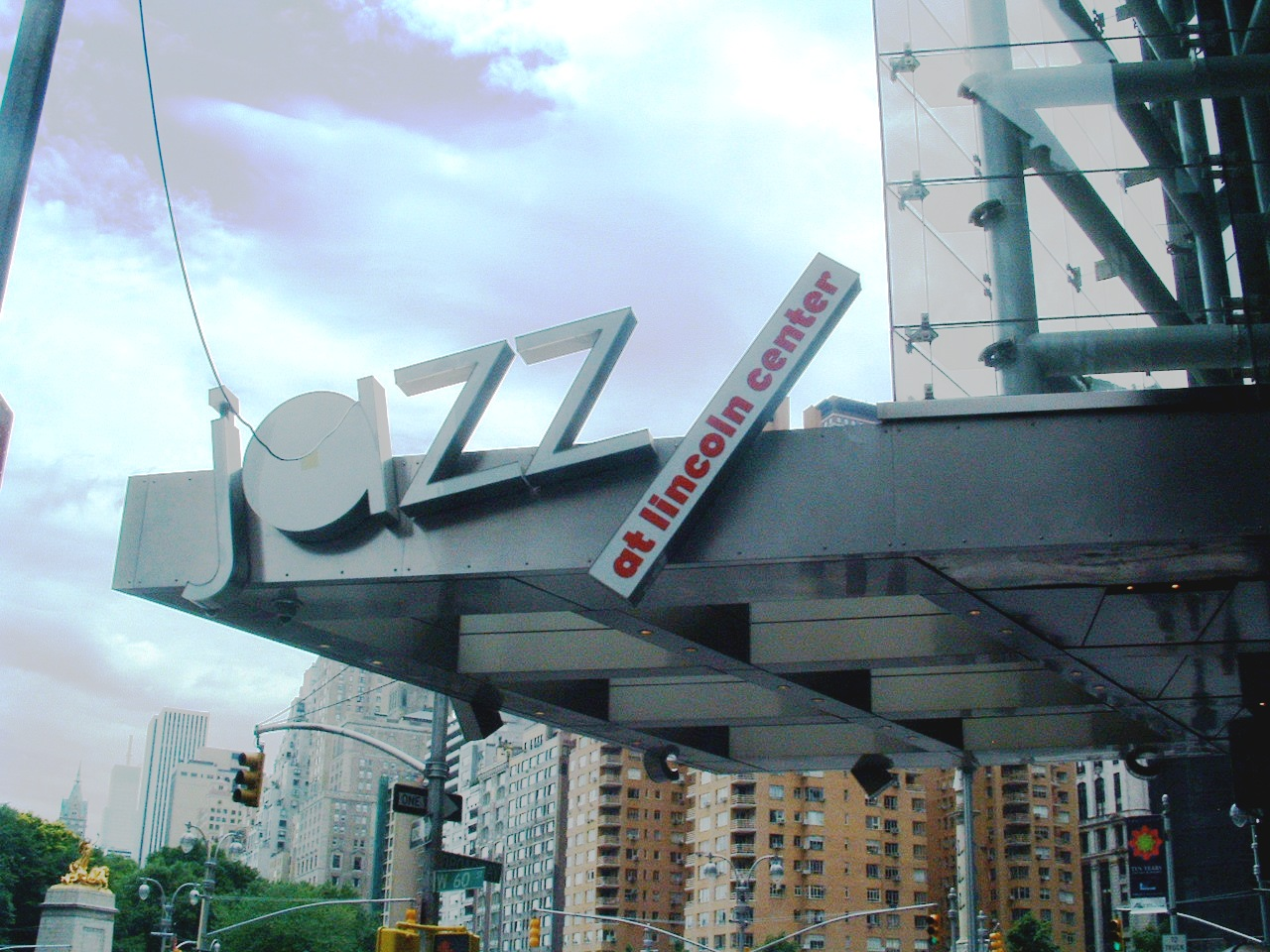
Jazz at Lincoln Center opened in Time Warner Center in October 2004.

The development was opened in phases starting in 2003. The first part of Time Warner Center to officially open was the Mandarin Oriental New York, which opened on November 15, 2003, although a formal ceremony was held in December 2003. Time Warner Center's formal opening ceremony was held on February 5, 2004, with a benefit party being hosted upon the completion of the Shops at Columbus Circle. At the time of the mall's opening, over four-fifths of the 40 stores and 10 restaurants were open. There were concerns among retail-industry experts that Time Warner Center's "vertical mall" concept would not be successful since high-rise malls in New York City had historically not been successful.

Final touches were still being placed on the building when, in April 2004, a piece of metal sheeting fell off the facade. This prompted Bloomberg to order that all work on the building be temporarily halted, since this was the fourth time since 2002 that debris had fallen from the building. The retail complex also faced challenges, such as an early 2004 fire in the Per Se restaurant, the first to open in the mall. Jazz at Lincoln Center opened in October 2004, almost a year after the rest of the complex had been completed. In total, the project had cost $1.8 billion.

==== Operation ====
The Sunshine Group was in charge of marketing the building. Businessman David Martínez bought one penthouse unit and a portion of another; at $40 to $45 million, the unit was the most expensive residence recorded in Manhattan at the time. Other early residents included designer Lady Henrietta Spencer-Churchill and musician Ricky Martin, as well as architect Jon Stryker, who used Time Warner Center as a temporary apartment because he did not want to rent a residence. The south tower's residents also included Saudi royal Turki bin Faisal Al Saud, art collector Tobias Meyer, producer Verna Harrah, and businessmen Gregory Olsen and John Kluge. Those of the north tower included ten doctors; businessmen Alan B. Miller, Michael Spencer, and Gerard Cafesjian; and two daughters of Turkish businessman Sakıp Sabancı. By late 2004, the apartments were about 85 percent sold. About a quarter of the original buyers were foreign buyers, and a third of the total buyers used shell corporations to obscure their identities.

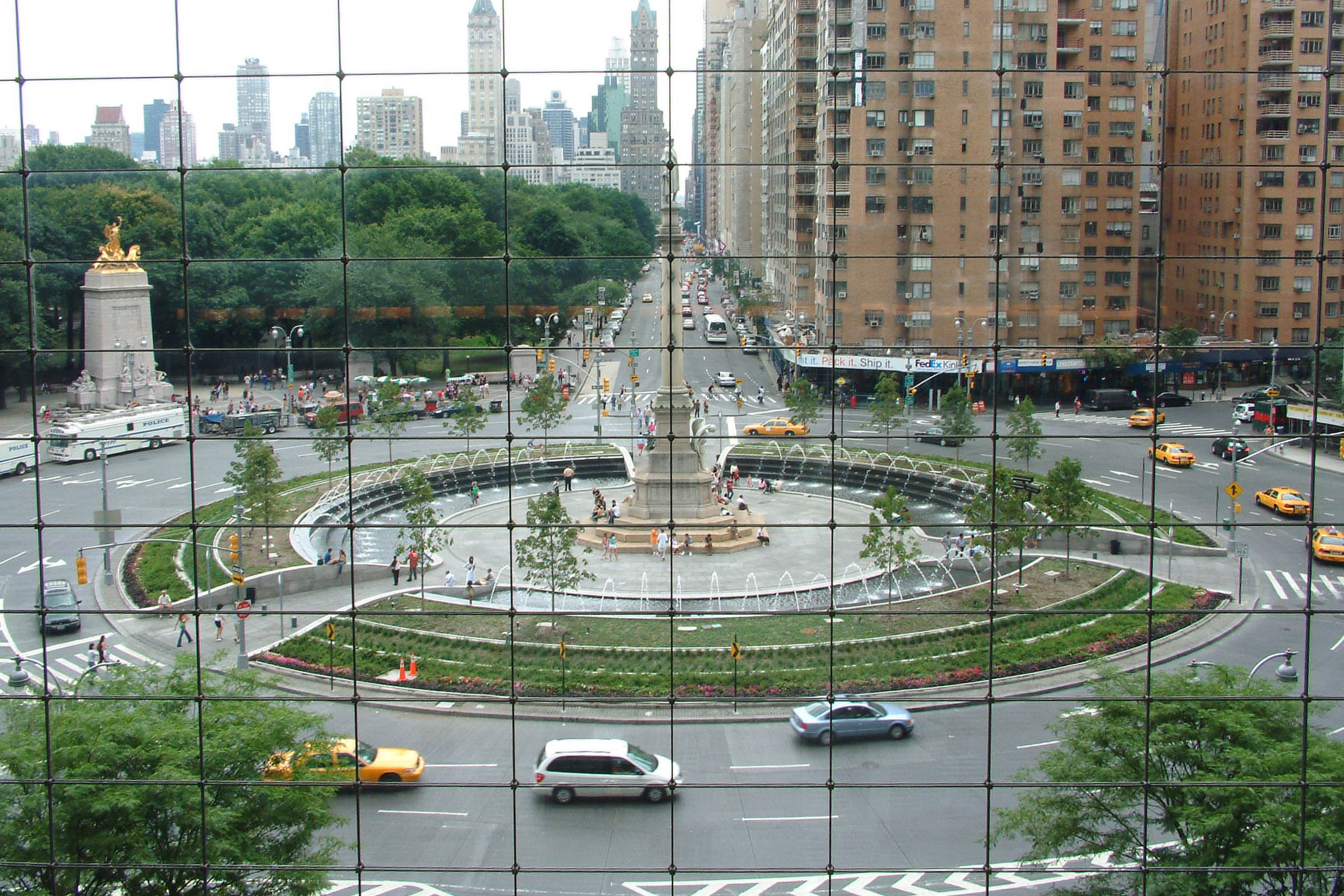
Columbus Circle, seen from the atrium

Within a year and a half of Time Warner Center's opening, the hotel and some of the shopping mall's retail spaces were relatively successful. However, several restaurateurs had already closed their operations in the building or were in the process of doing so. The property had the highest-listed market value in New York City, $1.1 billion, in 2006. The building's last condominium was sold that March. By that time, a monthly parking pass alone ran from $550 to $600, more expensive than a one-bedroom residence in several Southern and Midwestern U.S. cities. Time Warner Center had become a popular destination by 2008; its presence had helped raise the value of surrounding properties by as much as 400 percent since 2004. Average condominium prices had risen 127 percent since the building's opening, with condos being listed at between $7 and $60 million.

Following the completion of the nearby 15 Central Park West in the late 2000s, condo prices at Time Warner Center began to decline. One unit in Time Warner Center was listed on the market in 2007 and was not sold for more than a decade. In 2013, Time Warner announced its intention to move most of its offices to 30 Hudson Yards on the west side of Manhattan. The following January, Time Warner sold its stake in the Columbus Circle building for $1.3 billion to the Related Companies, the Abu Dhabi Investment Authority, and GIC Private Limited. The companies funded the purchase of the office space with a five-year, $675 million mortgage from Deutsche Bank and Bank of China.

By the 2010s, the residential apartments of Time Warner Center were acquired by a large number of extremely wealthy residents. In 2015, The New York Times found that Time Warner Center's condominium owners had included seventeen people on Forbes magazine's The World's Billionaires list, as well as five major art collectors, eight chief executives, and celebrities such as singer Jimmy Buffett, football player Tom Brady, and talk show host Kelly Ripa. The vast majority of condominiums, about eighty percent, had been purchased by shell companies by 2014, with some of the tenants being involved in controversy. These included Vitaly Malkin, a Russian senator accused of ties to organized crime; Wang Wenliang, a Chinese businessman whose company was accused of dangerous construction conditions; and Anil Agarwal, an Indian businessman whose mining company had been charged with pollution in India and Zambia. The controversy in part influenced the United States Department of the Treasury to regulate large all-cash property sales in Manhattan starting in 2016.

=== Deutsche Bank use ===
In May 2018, Deutsche Bank announced it would lease all 1.1 million square feet (100,000 m^{2}) of office space for 25 years, relocating from 60 Wall Street beginning in the third quarter of 2021. The move represented a reduction in space for the bank, which had occupied 1.6 million square feet (150,000 m^{2}) at 60 Wall Street. Following the news, Related Companies announced that the building would be officially renamed "Deutsche Bank Center" upon the company's arrival. In May 2019, Related refinanced the office portion of the development with a $1.1 billion loan from Wells Fargo. After announcing plans to drastically reduce its overseas activities in mid-2019, Deutsche Bank returned two of the floors, covering 60,000 square feet (5,600 m^{2}), to the Related Companies. Meanwhile, the CNN studios had relocated to Hudson Yards by late 2019.

Between March 2020 and April 2021, the Mandarin Oriental hotel in Time Warner Center was closed due to the COVID-19 pandemic in New York City, undergoing a minor renovation during that time. Time Warner Center was renamed to Deutsche Bank Center in May 2021, with Time Warner signage being replaced with that of Deutsche Bank over a one-week period. The bank was scheduled to relocate 5,000 employees to the building, but the relocation was delayed. The bank's employees were being relocated by July 2021.

== Critical reception ==
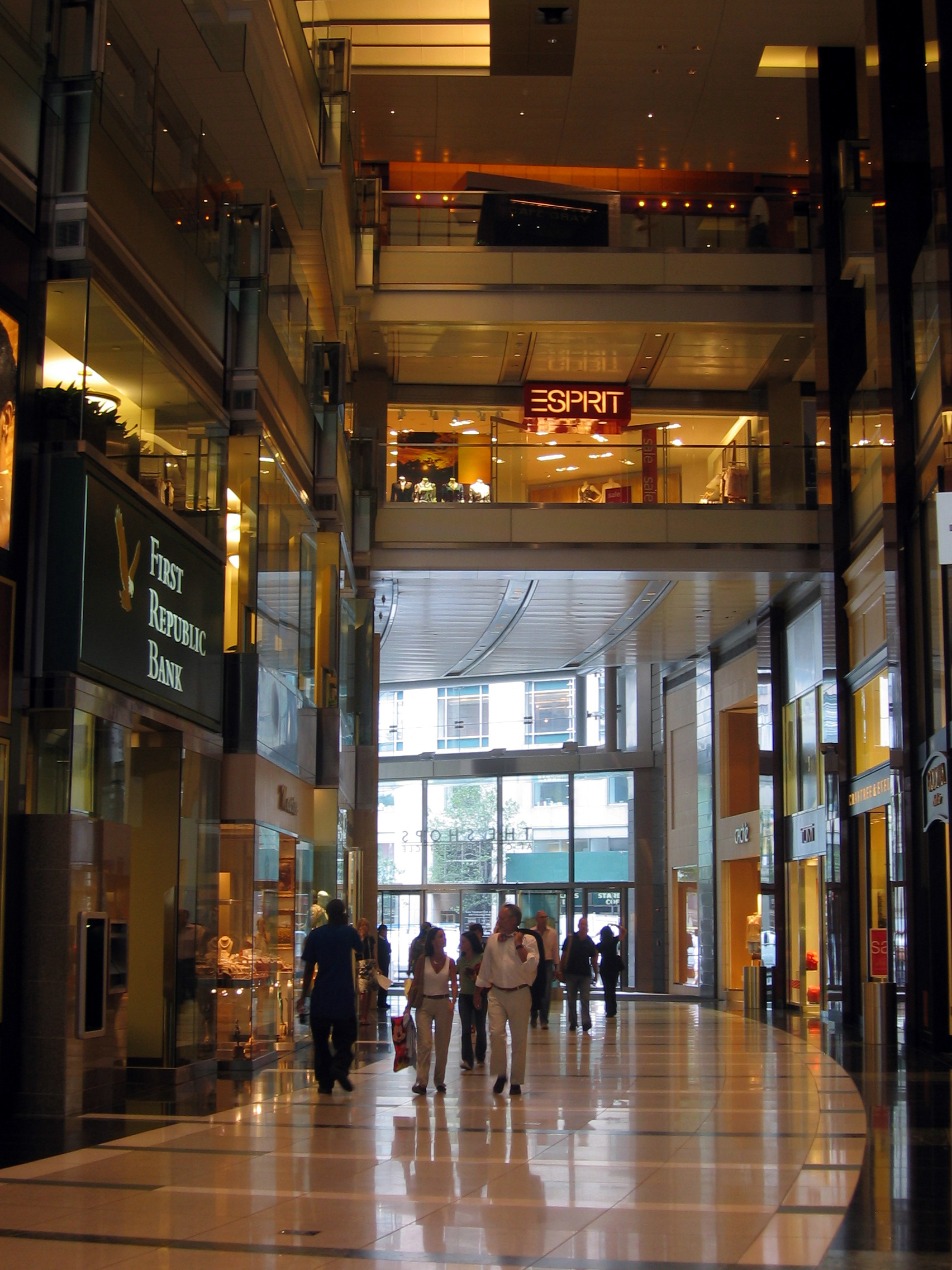
Curved hallway at the Shops at Columbus Circle

When the original design was announced in July 1998, Herbert Muschamp wrote for The New York Times that the glass facade was a "major improvement" compared to Childs's earlier proposals of the late 1980s, but he believed that the design was "skillful, earnest and devoid of meaning". At the end of the year, Muschamp was even more negative, characterizing the building as an example of "architecture of denial" and derided it as indicating "an utter lack of awareness that New York today differs dramatically from the city in the 1930's". Peter Blake, editor of Architectural Record, wrote of the project in late 1998: "Manhattan is about to have a building of singular klutziness imposed upon it." Both Muschamp's and Blake's complaints originated from the fact that the original plans resembled the setback-laden massing of older stone-faced apartment buildings on Central Park West, except with a glass cladding.

When the updated plan was announced in June 2000, Muschamp wrote that the design "is an asymmetrical composition of crystalline contours" and that, in sharp contrast to the previous plan, it was not derivative of older Central Park West towers. Muschamp disliked the "lanterns" that were to be placed atop the towers, and he found the facade of the base to be "infected" by "aesthetic backsliding", but overall he thought the design to be a homage to the city's Art Deco architecture. By contrast, Martin Filler of The New Republic was dissatisfied with the revised glass design, especially as opposed to the masonry plans: "Light construction [...] implies the dual phenomena of weightlessness and transparency; and there is none of the former and little of the latter in evidence here." The plans also faced opposition from community groups that considered the building to be too large.

After the September 11 attacks, the towers of Time Warner Center were compared to the destroyed World Trade Center, though the building's developers denied any intentional similarity to the fallen Twin Towers. In 2003, Architectural Record wrote: "AOL Time Warner Center with its new twin towers is testimony of how the people of the city can overcome great obstacles to get on with life." When Time Warner Center was almost completed, Paul Goldberger wrote for The New Yorker that, though the design had been intended to conform with the surrounding street grid, this was nullified by the building's sheer size. According to Goldberger, "The best you can say is that they prevent it from being worse than it is, or as bad as earlier versions, which date from the nineteen-eighties." Peggy Deamer of the Journal of the American Institute of Architects wrote in 2004: "Shouldn't the designers have broadened the notion of context beyond the building envelope?"

In spite of criticism over the building's size, architectural critics generally approved of Time Warner Center when it was completed. Ada Louise Huxtable wrote for The Wall Street Journal in early 2004: "The AOL Time Warner Center is exactly what a New York skyscraper should be—a soaring, shining, glamorous affirmation of the city's reach and power, and its best real architecture in a long time." Muschamp said of the completed building: "...The mood is modern noir. The two towers are worthy descendants of Radio City." Even though Goldberger did not like the building's size, he said, "If you don’t look up, you could like this building", though he regarded it as "a theme-park version of a sophisticated urban building". A writer for Reason magazine said that, while critics did not praise Time Warner Center as they did the Hearst Tower or the New York Times Building, "they do agree the commercial behemoth deserves its place in this emerging pantheon of buildings". The American Institute of Architects' 2007 survey List of America's Favorite Architecture ranked the Time Warner Center among the top 150 buildings in the United States.

== See also ==
- Buildings and architecture of New York City
- List of tallest buildings in New York City
