= Masa (restaurant) =

Japanese restaurant in New York City

- Interactive map of Masa

Restaurant information
- Established: 2004; 22 years ago
- Owner: Masa Takayama
- Chef: Masa Takayama
- Food type: Japanese and sushi
- Rating: Michelin Guide: of 3 stars; Mobil Star: 5 of 5 stars; The New York Times: 3 of 4 stars; Travel + Leisure: New York's top 50
- Location: The fourth floor of the Time Warner Center at 10 Columbus Circle (at West 60th Street and Broadway) in Manhattan, New York City, New York, 10019, United States
- Coordinates: 40.768236°N 73.982344°W
- Other information: Two Prix fixes options at either $750 per person or $950 per person
- Website: Official website

Masa (雅) is a Japanese and sushi restaurant in the Shops at Columbus Circle, on the fourth floor of the Deutsche Bank Center at 10 Columbus Circle, in Manhattan, New York City.

The restaurant was opened by Chef Masa Takayama in 2004. Located next door to the restaurant is Bar Masa, cheaper and offering an à la carte menu. In 2009, a second Bar Masa opened inside Aria in Las Vegas which closed in 2018.

== Menu ==
The offerings are omakase (no menu) only, with chef-selected meals costing $750 per person, not including tax or drinks, though gratuity is included along with a $950 "Hinoki Experience" guaranteeing a counter space as well as a $495 lunch option. The sushi bar itself is a $260,000 piece of rare hinoki wood from Japan. Reservations for the 26 available seats are taken three weeks in advance. Chef Masa Takayama prepares the menu himself, often including seasonal ingredients. He uses many exotic ingredients, such as truffles and Omi beef. Most of the fish is flown in from Japan. Chef Masa can be seen working behind the bar and will sometimes serve the food as well. While there is no menu to order from, Chef Masa does keep a record of what he has served to his customers and what their reactions were so he can cater to them on their next visit.

== Recognition ==
Masa garnered the Michelin Guide's highest rating starting with the 2009 guide and was the first Japanese restaurant in the US to do so. It received three out of four stars from The New York Times. It has also received five out of five stars in the Forbes Travel Guide (formerly known as the Mobil Guide). It has been named as one of New York's Top 50 by Travel + Leisure. Forbes named Masa as the Most Expensive Restaurant in the US for 2005 through 2009 as well as The World's Most Expensive Sushi in 2007 through 2009.

== Chef ==
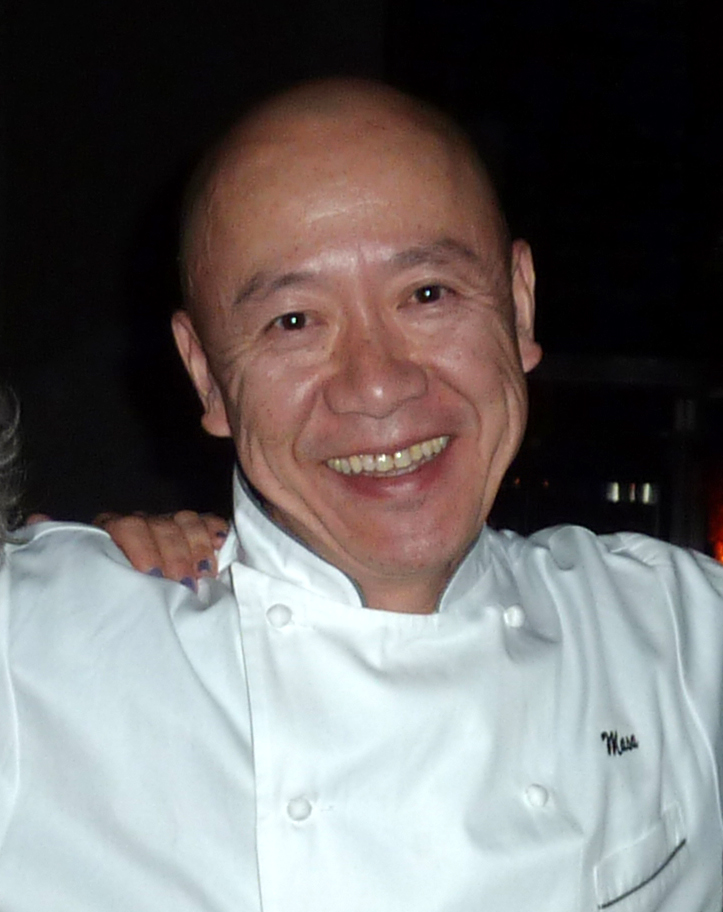
Chef Masa Takayama

Masa Takayama was born and raised in Japan. After high school, he worked at Tokyo's famous Sushiko in Ginza. In 1980, he moved to Los Angeles, where he eventually opened his own Ginza Sushiko. He established Ginza Sushiko as one of the most expensive restaurants in Los Angeles at an average meal price of $105 per person. Nearly 20 years after opening the restaurant, he sold it to his sous-chef and moved to New York to open Masa, and later Bar Masa in both New York and Las Vegas. He opened a second restaurant in Las Vegas in 2009 which subsequently closed in 2018.

== See also ==
- List of sushi restaurants
- List of Michelin 3-star restaurants in the United States
- List of Michelin-starred restaurants in New York City
