= Masa Takayama =

Japanese chef

Masayoshi "Masa" Takayama
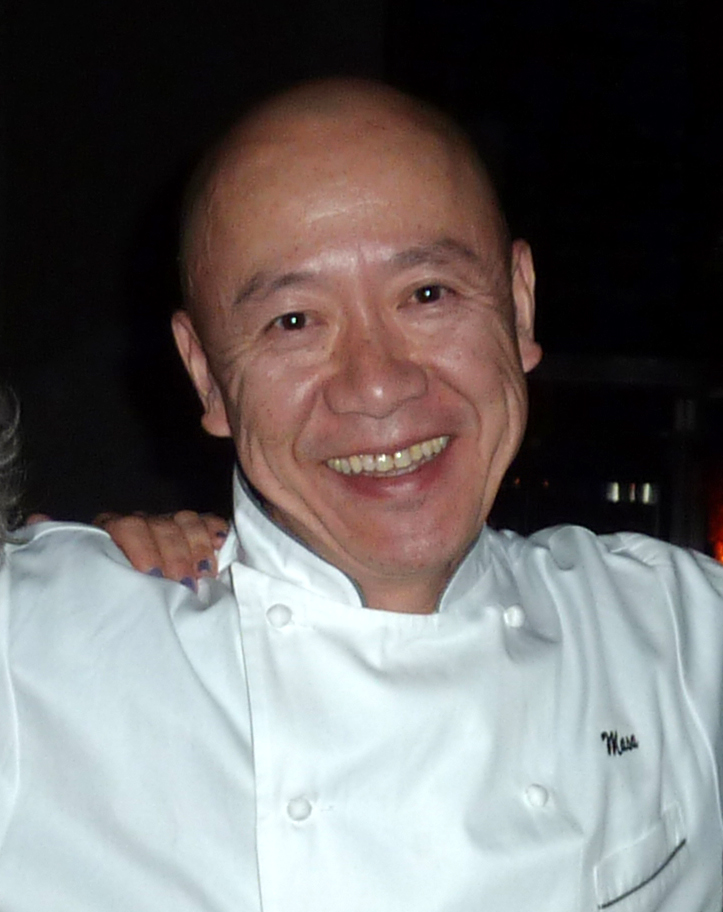
- Takayama in 2009
- Born: 1 May 1954 (age 72); Kuroiso, Tochigi, Japan
- Culinary career
- Cooking style: Japanese
- Ratings: Michelin stars; The New York Times; Mobil
- Current restaurants: Masa; Bar Masa (New York City); Tetsu
- Previous restaurant: Ginza Sushiko
- Website: Official website

Masayoshi "Masa" Takayama (高山 雅氏, Takayama Masayoshi) (born 1 May 1954) is a Japanese chef and restaurateur. He is the owner of Masa, a two-Michelin-starred Japanese and sushi restaurant in Manhattan, New York City. He is also owner of Bar Masa, with two locations: one adjacent to his New York City restaurant, and one in the Aria Resort & Casino on the Las Vegas Strip in Paradise, Nevada.

== Early years ==
Takayama was born in Kuroiso, Tochigi, a small town three hours north of Tokyo. His parents owned a fish shop and a catering business. He began cutting fish as a child. His brother and three sisters all helped in the store, loading the fish into the display cases before school. After school, Takayama would get on his bicycle and deliver sashimi his father had made. In the spring, which is wedding season in Japan, the family catered celebrations, typically five-course dinners for 200 guests where he would help all day at the expense of school. In high school, he wanted to become a surgeon.

After high school, he apprenticed for eight years at the famous Sushiko in Tokyo's upscale Ginza district. As per traditional culinary apprenticeship in Japan, he spent many of those years working on mundane tasks such as dishwasher and bathroom cleaner before rising to the level of sushi chef. In 1978, a vacation to Los Angeles convinced him to move to the United States.

In 1980, Takayama opened his first restaurant in Los Angeles, Saba-ya. He planned to eventually open a restaurant that would be closer to what was available in Japan, a plan that he felt he fulfilled with his second restaurant, Ginza Sushiko.

== Ginza Sushiko ==
Ginza Sushiko, sometimes spelled Ginza Sushi-ko, opened in 1987 in the corner of a mini-mall in an unglamorous section of Wilshire Boulevard; it was not far from Saba-ya. Originally aimed at Japanese diners, it did not advertise and had an unlisted telephone number. However, it quietly gained a reputation as the most expensive restaurant in Los Angeles, and a place for food purists. Instead of a menu, diners were served omakase and meals lasted two to three hours.

Takayama would keep a careful record of each customer, the date he or she dined at the restaurant, how many were in the party, what they drank and what they ate so that he could offer them something new on their next visit. He would have most of his fish flown in from the Tsukiji fish market in Tokyo. In 1990, the average bill without alcohol, depending on the amount eaten by a customer and the fluctuating price of fish, ranged from $125 to $150 per person. Ginza Sushiko garnered some celebrity attention.

Marlon Brando, who would frequently visit the restaurant after hours with his family, was reportedly the only customer to whom Takayama would deliver food.

After eight years at its original location, it moved in 1992 to the more fashionable and upscale Rodeo Drive in Beverly Hills. The 12-seat restaurant cemented its status as Los Angeles' most expensive and exclusive sushi restaurant. A decade later, Takayama decided to try a change of surroundings and sold Ginza Sushiko to his sous-chef, who changed the name to Urasawa.

== Restaurants ==
My job the same as carpenter. What kind of house you want to build? What kind of food you want to make? You think your ingredients, your structure. Simple. [Other] Japanese restaurants ... mix in some other style of food and call it influence, right? I don't like that. ... In Japanese sushi restaurants, a lot of sushi chefs talk too much. This fish from there, This very expensive. Same thing, start singing. And a lot have that fish case in front of them, cannot see what chef do. I'm not going to hide anything, right?

— Describing his cooking style, The New York Times

In 2004, Takayama opened his eponymous restaurant, Masa, in New York City. Located in recently constructed Time Warner Center, it had a 26-seat dining area. The idea for the location came from fellow chef and admirer Thomas Keller, who was opening his own restaurant, Per Se, in the complex. Continuing the ideas he developed in Los Angeles, Masa continued to serve only an omakase menu, tracking his customers' meals and reactions, and sourced 90% of his fish from Tokyo's Tsukiji fish market.

Restaurant Masa garnered the Michelin Guide's highest rating starting in the 2009 edition and was the first Japanese restaurant in the U.S. to do so. It was one of the few restaurants in New York City to hold a four out of four star rating by The New York Times, but was downgraded to 3 stars in 2011. It has also received five out of five stars in the Forbes Travel Guide (formerly known as the Mobil Guide).

Two a la carte offshoots of the flagship in New York followed, Bar Masa and Kappo Masa. A second Bar Masa opened in the Aria Resort & Casino in CityCenter on the Las Vegas Strip in December 2009. The restaurant also included Shaboo, an upscale omakase-style shabu-shabu dining room that charges approximately $500 per person without drinks.

In 2012 Shaboo was replaced by Tetsu, with a Yakitori-based menu emphasizing grilled fare, and featuring both a la carte and Omakase menus. In November 2017 Masa opened a second branch of Tetsu in New York City's Tribeca neighborhood.

== Personal life ==
Takayama married Hisako Ishii, a Japanese native studying English he met at an Orange County sushi bar where he worked, in 1979. Together they had three children before they separated, one of whom, Catherine Takayama, is a pastry chef at The French Laundry. He plays golf, runs marathons and is also a potter who designed the plates at Masa, along with sake cups of wood and bamboo.

He lives on the Upper West Side of Manhattan in New York City.
