= Wang Wenliang =

Chinese businessperson and elected official

Wang Wenliang (Chinese: 王文良, born 1954) bom Penglai, Shandong, is a Chinese entrepreneur and political figure of the People's Republic of China, a member of the Chinese Overseas Chinese Federation, and vice chairman of the Liaoning Overseas Chinese Federation. He was the chairman for privately held China Rilin Construction Group. He was a member of the 12th National People's Congress, but was removed from it over allegations of vote fraud. He is or was chair of Dandong Port Group. As of 2017, he was worth $1.2 billion USD per Forbes.

He served on the board of governors of New York University and made a large donation to it.

Early on, I worked at the Dandong municipal government before entering the business world in the early 1990s. Served as Chairman and President of Rilin Construction Group Corporation from February 2005. In 2005, Rilin Construction Group formally took control of Dandong Port Group, with Wang Wenliang serving as its chairman. In 2012, he earned an honorary doctorate in business administration from the University of South Carolina in the United States. In 2013, I was elected as a National People's Congress representative. In 2016, the election was deemed invalid on suspicion of bribery. His nephew Zhong Dan served as a diplomat at the Chinese Consulate General in New York and the Chinese Embassy in the United States from 2001 to 2009, and was found guilty by a jury in New York of all five charges against him. On Friday, a 12-member jury in the Eastern District of New York ruled that Zhong Dan was guilty of conspiring to force labor, forced labor, concealing documents related to forced labor, conspiring to smuggle foreigners, and conspiring to commit visa fraud.
