= Massa =

Massa may refer to:

== Places ==
=== Italy ===
- Province of Massa and Carrara, province in the Tuscany region of Italy
- Duchy of Massa and Carrara, controlled the towns of Massa di Carrara and Carrara
- Roman Catholic Diocese of Massa Marittima-Piombino was before 1978 called diocese of Massa Marittima

==== Italian towns ====
- Massa, Tuscany, the administrative seat of the Italian province of Massa-Carrara.
- Massa d'Albe, province of L'Aquila
- Massa di Somma, province of Naples
- Massa e Cozzile, province of Pistoia
- Massa Fermana, province of Ascoli Piceno
- Massa Fiscaglia, province of Ferrara
- Massa Lombarda, province of Ravenna
- Massa Lubrense, province of Naples
- Massa Marittima, province of Grosseto
- Massa Martana, province of Perugia

=== France ===
- Peyrusse-Massas, commune in the Gers department in southwestern France
- Castillon-Massas, commune in the Gers department in southwestern France
- Hôtel de Massa, in the 14th arrondissement of Paris

=== Morocco ===
- Massa, Morocco, a town
- Souss-Massa National Park, national park on the Atlantic coast of Morocco
- Souss-Massa, one of the twelve regions of Morocco
- Massa River (Morocco), Tiznit Province

=== Other countries ===
- Massa (river), river in Switzerland
- Mässa, village in Saaremaa Parish, Saare County, Estonia
- Massa (Tanzanian ward), administrative ward in the Mpwapwa district of the Dodoma Region of Tanzania
- Massa, Libya, a town in Libya
- Massah (מסה), place where the Israelites quarreled with God, according to the Torah

=== Fictional locations ===
- Polis Massa, fictional planet from Star Wars

== People ==
- Massa (surname)
- Massa (biblical figure), from Genesis
- Massa Makan Diabaté (1938–1988), Malian historian, author, and playwright
- Michael of Massa (Michael Beccucci de Massa) (died 1337), Italian Augustinian Hermit and theologian

Groups

- Ray Massa's EuroRhythms, Italian-American band from Columbus, Ohio

Animals

- Massa (gorilla), gorilla from the Philadelphia Zoo

== Other uses ==
- Massa language, African language
- Portuguese sweet bread or Massa Sovada
- El Massa, Algerian daily newspaper Printed in Arabic
- Massa Marittima Cathedral, main church of Massa Marittima
- Massa–Senigallia Line, in the linguistics of the Romance languages
- Massa intermedia, the Interthalamic adhesion
- Massa, in early African American Vernacular English, see slave master
- Massa (song)
- Massa Fresca, Portuguese television series

== See also ==
- Masa (disambiguation)
