= Masa (disambiguation) =

Masa is type of dough made from corn.

Masa or MASA may also refer to:

== People with the given name ==
- masa (まさ), a producer from Japan who mostly utilizes Vocaloid
- Masa (musician), stage name of a Japanese musician
- Masa Fukuda (福田 真史; born 1976), Japanese-American songwriter
- Masa Iseri, (1902-2016) Japanese supercentenarian
- Masa Kitamiya (マサ 北宮; born 1988), Japanese professional wrestler
- Masa Matsumoto, (1909-2024) Japanese supercentenarian
- Masa Nakayama (中山 マサ; 1891–1976), Japanese politician and educator
- Masa Niemi, (1914–1960) Finnish actor, comedian, musician and entertainer.
- Masa Saito (宅見 将典; 1942–2018), Japanese professional wrestler
- Masa Takanashi (マサ 高梨; born 1983), Japanese-American songwriter
- Masa Takayama (高山 雅氏; born 1954), Japanese chef and restaurateur
- Masa Takumi (宅見 将典; born 1988), Japanese Grammy Award-winning multi-instrumentalist, composer, and music producer
- Masa Yamaguchi (山口 英勝; born 1988), Japanese-Australian actor
- Mura Masa, (born 1996) Guernsey-born electronic record producer and songwriter
- George Masa, (born 1996) Japanese photographer
- Marco Masa, (born 2007) Filipino actor and model

== Fictional characters ==
- Masa, a character in the series Chrono Trigger
- Masa Muramasa, a character in the series Generation Xth
- Masa Shimamoto, a character in the series Meta Runner

== Places ==
- Masa (land), a land to the west of Hatti in Late Bronze Age Anatolia
- Masa (restaurant), in New York City
- Masa, Estonia, a village in Saaremaa Parish, Saare County, Estonia
- Masa of Echo Park, a restaurant and pizzeria in Los Angeles, California
- Masa's Wine Bar & Kitchen, Michelin-rated restaurant in San Francisco, California
- Mexicano Aeronáutica y Spacio Administración, fictional aerospace agency depicted in the South Park episode "Free Willzyx"
- Masa, Gurabo, Puerto Rico, a barrio in the municipality of Gurabo, Puerto Rico (US)
- Kappo Masa Restaurant, Japanese restaurant located within the Gagosian Gallery

== Organizations ==
- Masa GmbH, a German worldwide company
- MASA (company), former bus manufacturer in Mexico
- Masa Israel Journey, umbrella organization based in Israel
- Mines African Staff Association, a defunct Northern Rhodesian trade union
- Montenegrin Academy of Sciences and Arts (MASA) is the most important scientific institution of Montenegro.

== Other uses ==
- Masa, a term for month in the Hindu calendar
- Masa languages, a group of Chadic languages
- Masa (mathematics), an abbreviation for maximal Abelian self-adjoint subalgebra
- Masa people (also called Masana, Banana, or Yagoua), an ethnic group localized in Cameroon and Chad
- Masa podrida, are traditional Filipino shortbread cookies
- MASA syndrome, is a rare X-linked recessive neurological disorder
- Masareal, is a Filipino delicacy
- MASA, an album by YoungBoy Never Broke Again

== See also ==
- Masa (Nigerian food)
- Massa (disambiguation)
- Matti (disambiguation), a Finnish male Christian name, a nickname of which is Masa
- Masi (disambiguation)
- Masha (disambiguation)
- Maasa Sudo (born 1992), Japanese actress and singer
- La Masa (disambiguation)
