= Matti =

Matti may refer to:

- Matti (given name), people with the given name
- Matti (surname), people with the surname
- Matti, Karnataka, a village in India
- Matti: Hell Is for Heroes, a 2006 film about Matti Nykänen

== See also ==
- Masa (disambiguation)
- Mati (disambiguation)
