= Massa River =

Massa River may refer to:

- Massa River (Morocco)
- The Massa (river), a river in Switzerland.
