= Mascia =

Mascia is an Italian surname. Notable people with the surname include:

- Nello Mascia (born 1946), Italian actor
- Graziella Mascia (1953–2018), Italian politician
- Jennifer Mascia (born 1977), American writer
- Juan Cruz Mascia (born 1994), Uruguayan footballer
- Bautista Mascia (born 1996), Uruguayan singer and rugby union player

== See also ==
- Masha (disambiguation)
