= Masha (disambiguation) =

Masha is a Russian diminutive form of the given name Maria.

Masha may also refer to:

- Masha (unit), an Indian traditional measure of weight
- Masha (woreda), a woreda (administrative division) of Ethiopia
  - Masha (town), a town in the woreda
- Masha (2004 film), a Russian comedy film
- Masha (2020 film), a Russian thriller drama film
- Masha, a region in ancient Arzawa
- Mosha, also spelled Masha, a village in Tehran Province, Iran
- Masha, the most contaminated zone to clean post-Chernobyl disaster
- Masha (character), a character from Masha and the Bear

== See also ==
- Masa (disambiguation)
- Mas-ha, a Palestinian village in the West Bank
- Mascia, surname
