= Sidi Ouassay =

Sidi Ouassay سيدي وساي
- Rural commune and town
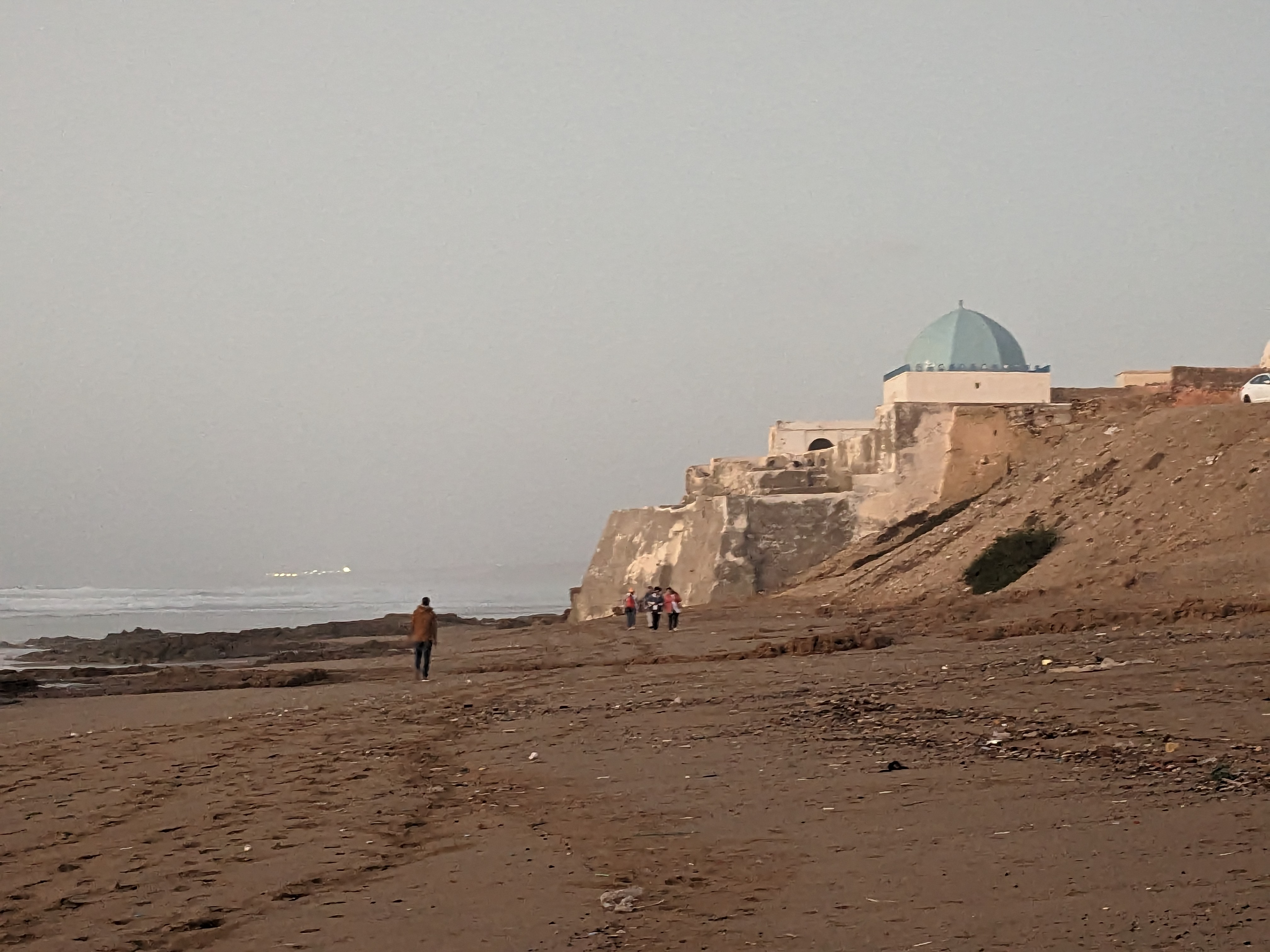

- Location within Morocco
- Coordinates: 30°03′N 9°41′W
- Country: Morocco
- Region: Souss-Massa-Drâa
- Province: Chtouka-Aït Baha Province

Population (2024)
  - Total: 9,939
- Time zone: UTC+0 (GMT)

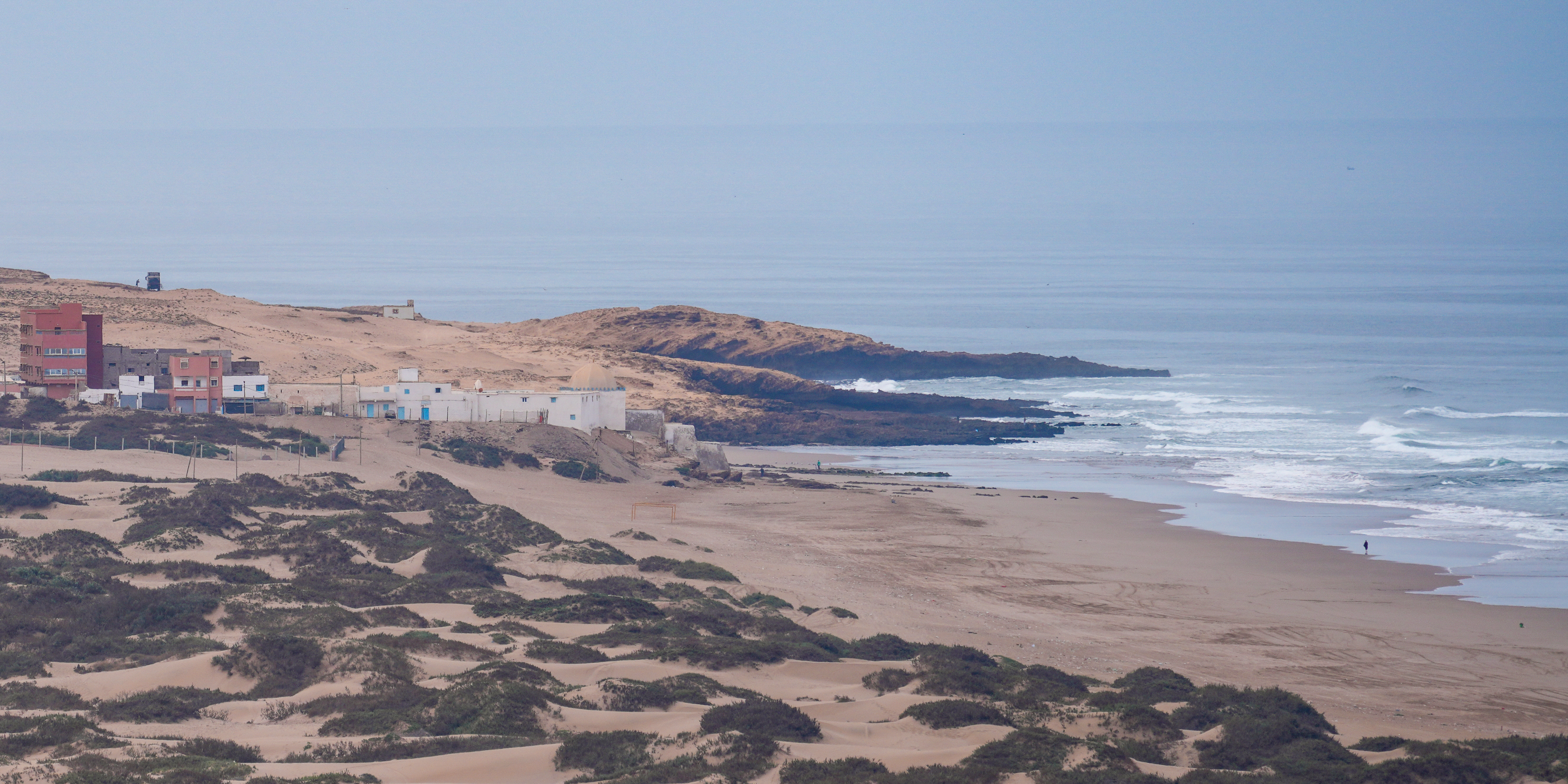
Beach and ocean-front buildings, from the north

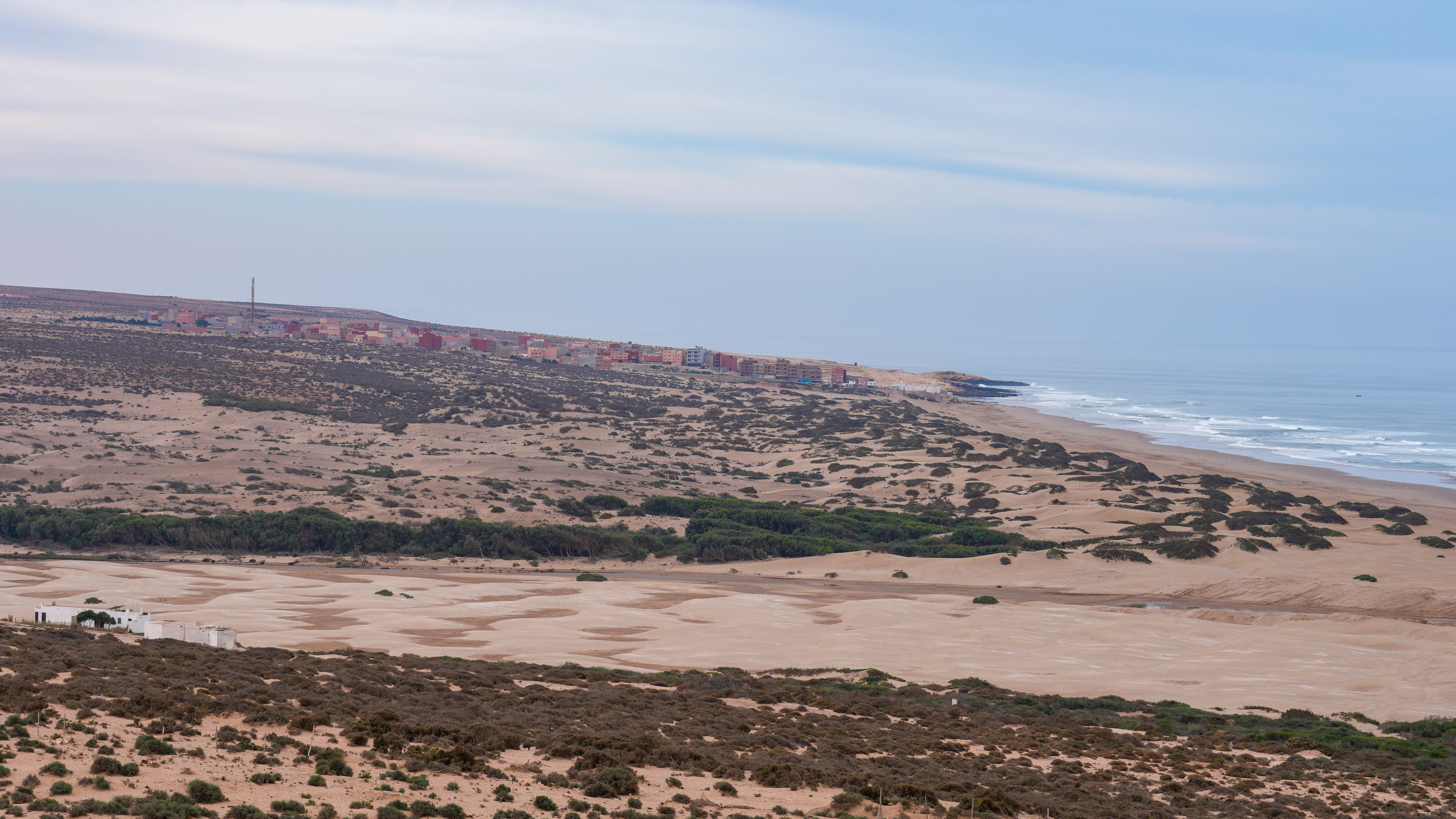
Massa delta and Sidi Ouassay from the north

Sidi Ouassay is a small town and rural commune in Chtouka-Aït Baha Province of the Souss-Massa region of Morocco. At the time of the 2024 census, the commune had a total population of 9,939 people living in 2,748 households. Sidi Ouassay is located 3 km (1.9 mi) south of the coastal village of Sidi R'bat.

== Demographics ==
In 2024, the commune had a total population of 9,939 people living in 2,748 households. Females constituted 48.1% of the population. 78.6% of the population reported Amazigh (Berber) as their mother tongue, while Arabic was 20.8%. 42.2% were employed, with employment among men being 71% and women only 11.1%.

== Economy ==
In 2024, 42.2% of the population over 15 years of age were employed, with employment among men being 71% and women only 11.1%. 16% of males and 21.7% of females received unemployment benefits. A very small number of men ran businesses, while most workers were self-employed or salaried (refer to the accompanying table of employment). A significant number of women did domestic work.

Percentages of workers in various types of employment
Type of employment	Total	Male	Female
Employer	1.1%	1.2%	0.0%
Self-employed	27.3%	30.3%	5.6%
Salaried	65.0%	64.5%	69.3%
Domestic helper	5.6%	3.1%	24.2%
