= Sidi R'bat =

Sidi R'bat سيدي الرباط
- Village
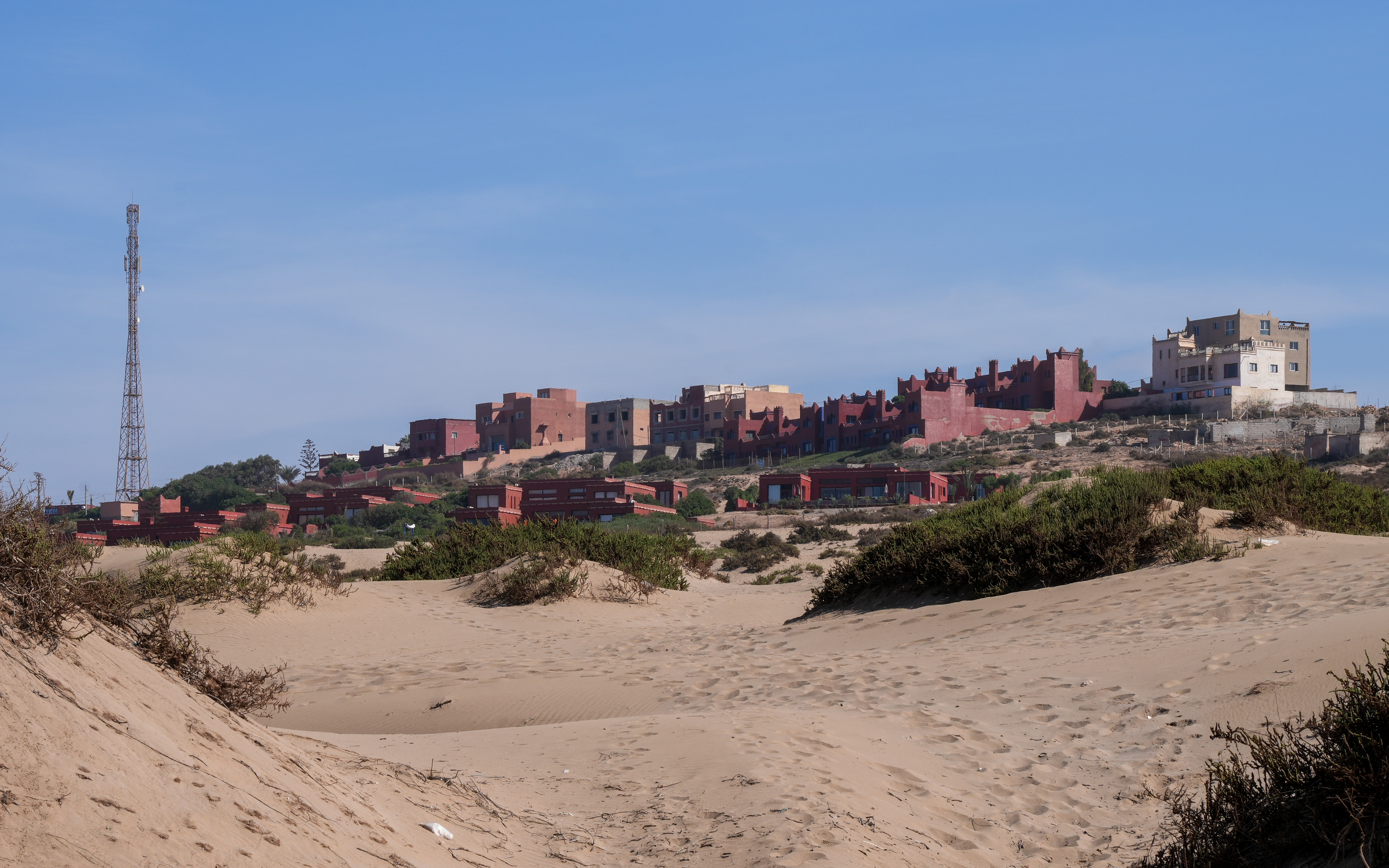
- Sidi R'bat viewed from the beach
- Interactive map of Sidi R'bat
- Coordinates: 30°05′06″N 9°39′45″W
- Country: Morocco
- Province: Chtouka Aït Baha Province
- Elevation: 30 m (98 ft)

Population
  - Total: 500

Languages

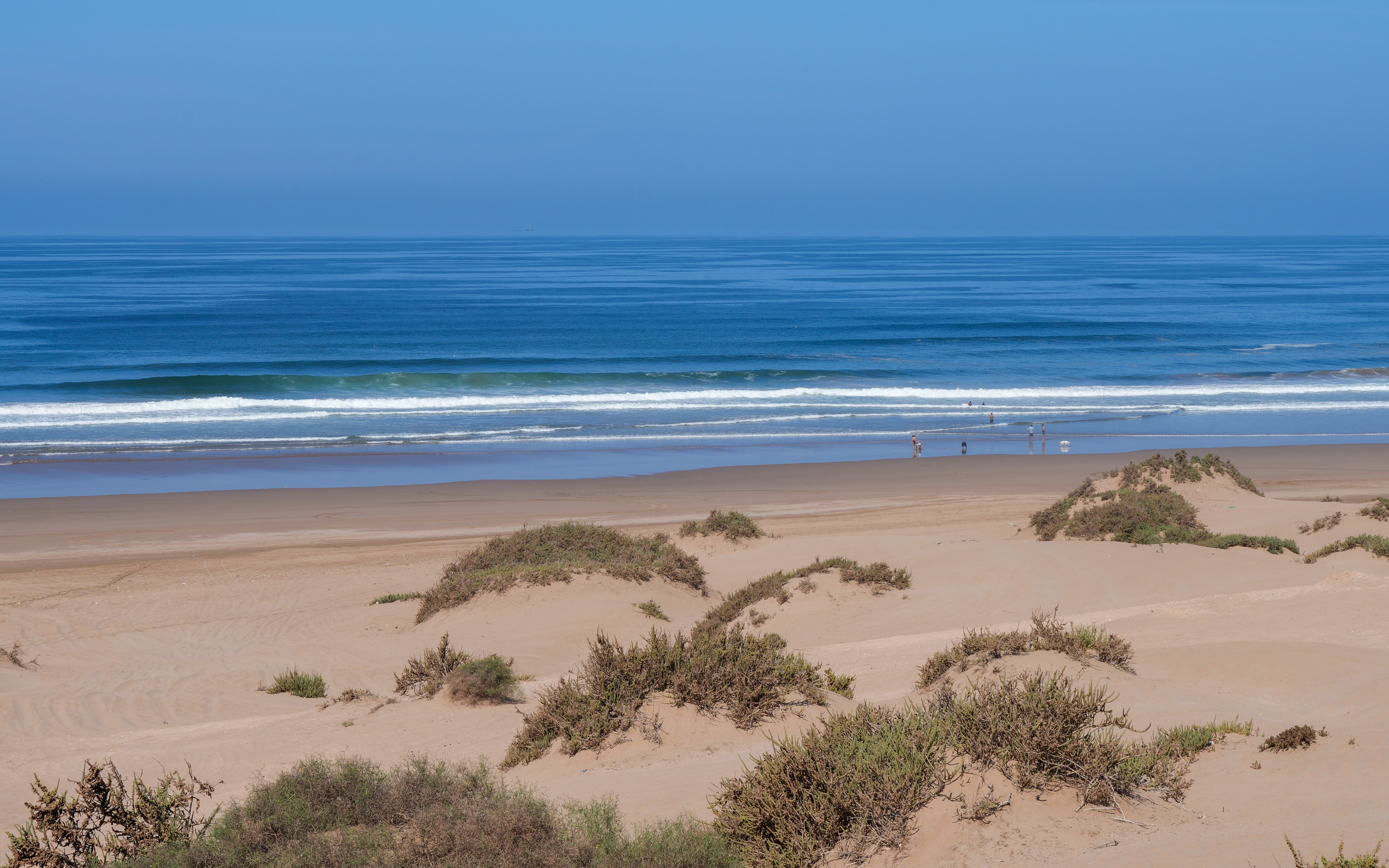
Sand dunes, beach and ocean

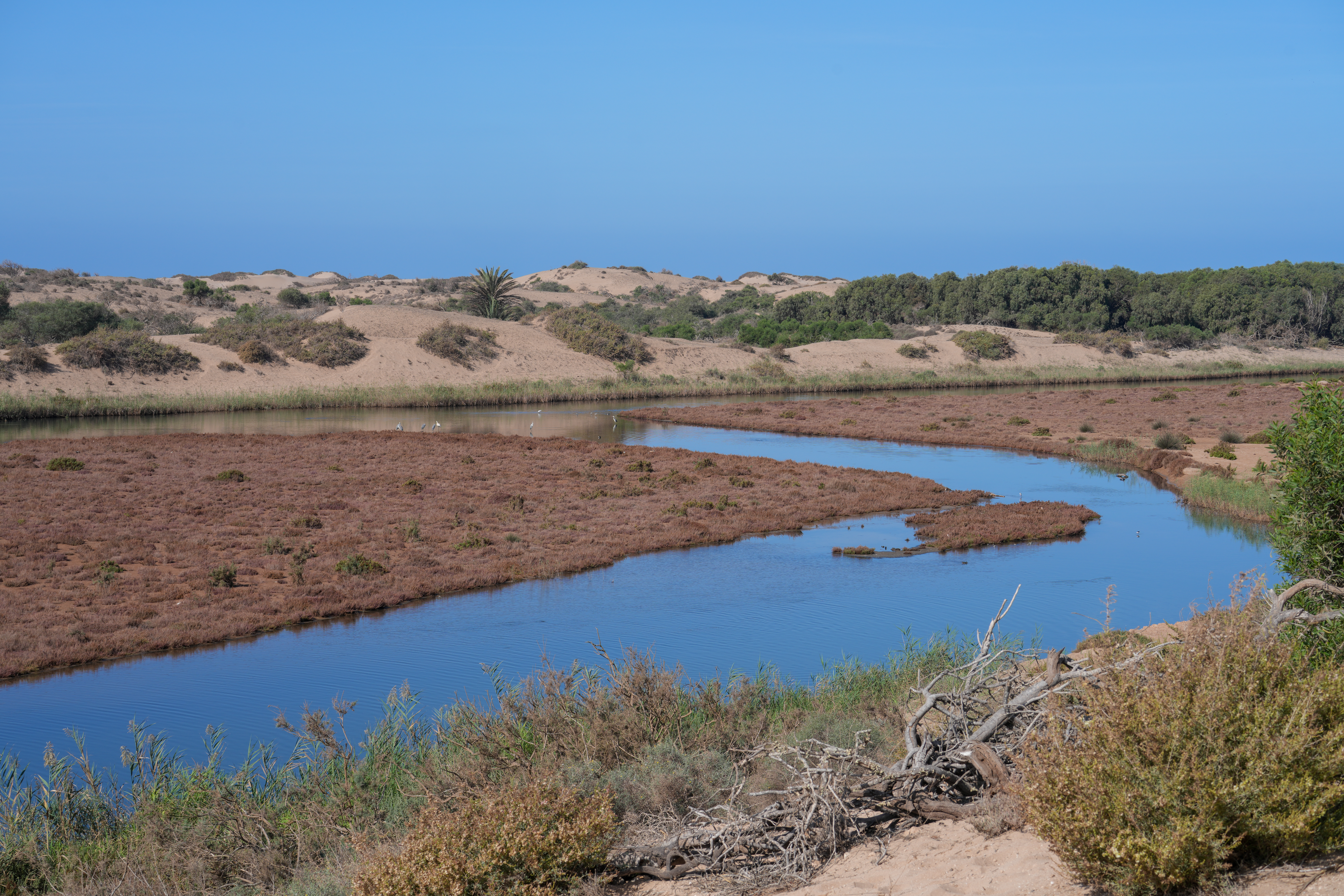
Wetlands of the Massa River near Sidi R'bat

Sidi R'Bat (Also Sidi Rabat; Arabic سيدي الرباط) is a small town with approximately 500 inhabitants on the Atlantic coast of Morocco in the Province of Chtouka-Aït Baha in the region of Souss-Massa. The economy is based on tourism, cattle raising and fishing.

== Description ==
Sidi R'Bat is located at the mouth of the Massa River, approximately 54 km (34 mi) north of Tiznit and about 60 km (37 mi) south of Agadir. It is in the centre of the Souss-Massa National Park. Sidi R'bat is located 3 km (1.9 mi) north of the coastal rural commune of Sidi Ouassay.

== Geography ==
The Sidi R'bat beach and the estuary of the Massa River are part of the Souss Massa wetlands complex, a designated Ramsar Site. The site number 1487 covering an area of 2,830 ha (7,000 acres) was designated on 15 January 2005. It consists of two separate areas, one at Sidi R'bat and the other near Agadir. The area includes sand dunes, freshwater and brackish marshes, coastal waters, sandy beaches and rocky shores. It is a refuge for over 270 bird species.

=== Climate ===
The predominantly warm climate is greatly influenced by the Atlantic Ocean and can be stormy, rainy and, above all, foggy on some days. Rainfall of approximately 250 mm (9.8 in)/year occurs almost exclusively during the winter months.

== Demographics ==
The total population is 400 to 500.

== Economy ==
The people living here were mainly cattle farmers. To a lesser extent, they also practise agriculture and fishing.

=== Tourism ===
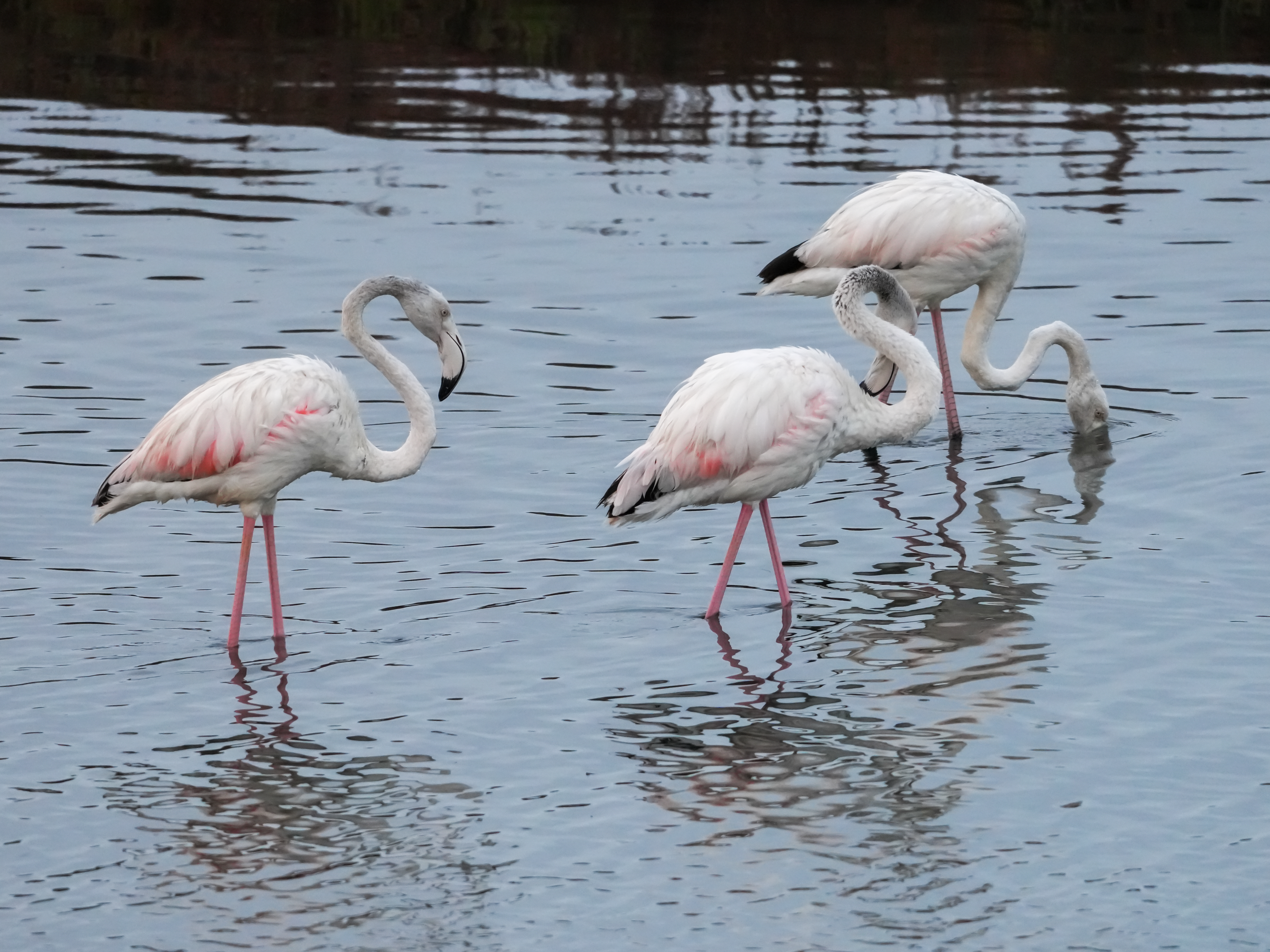
Greater flamingos in the Massa River

Since the 1960s, tourism has played an increasingly important role. With a beach several kilometres long and proximity to the Souss-Massa National Park, tourists can enjoy hiking, bird-watching, swimming, surfing and fishing. Other attractions include cave houses along the beach and the Great Souk of Massa on Tuesdays.

=== Handicrafts ===
In the rural areas of the Souss-Massa region, only 16.5% of women were employed in 2021. In Sidi R'bat, most women are dependant on male members who engage in fishing and agriculture. Single women and widows, without male family members, are particularly affected by poverty and unemployment. Margaux Derhy, an artist whose mother is French and father is a native of Sidi R'bat, wanted to make a change. In 2022, she started an embroidery studio in Sidi R'bat to improve the socio-economic status of women. The women, mostly single or widowed, create embroidery based on paintings and old photographs. By 2025, their products had been sold in exhibitions in Marrakech, Paris and Brussels, with more planned in Casablanca and Dubai.

== Transport ==
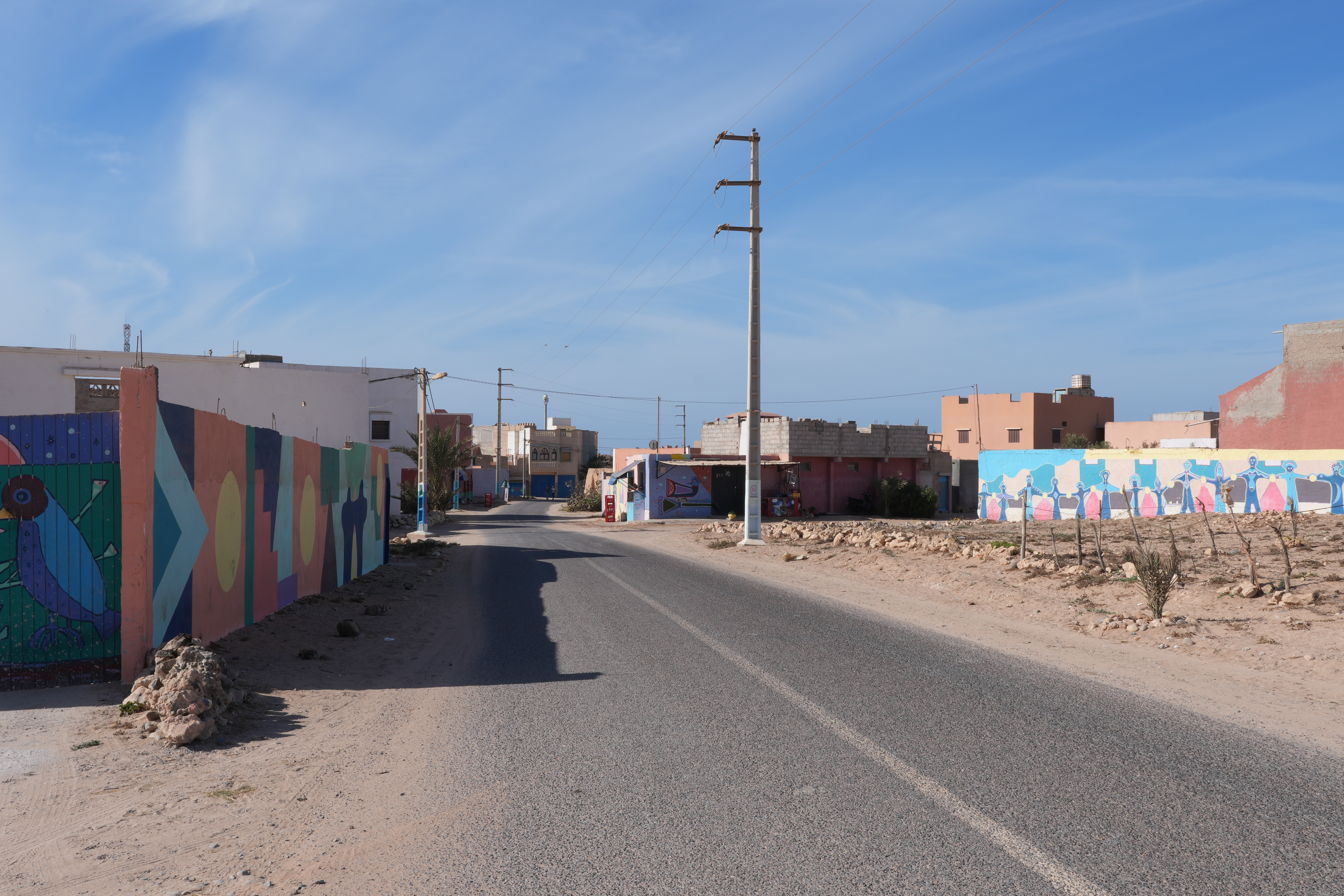
Road P1018 entering Sidi R'bat from the east

Sidi R'bat is connected to Tiznit, Agadir and other cities by provincial road P1018 which ends in the village. The interior roads of the village are unpaved.

== Photo gallery ==
=== Buildings ===
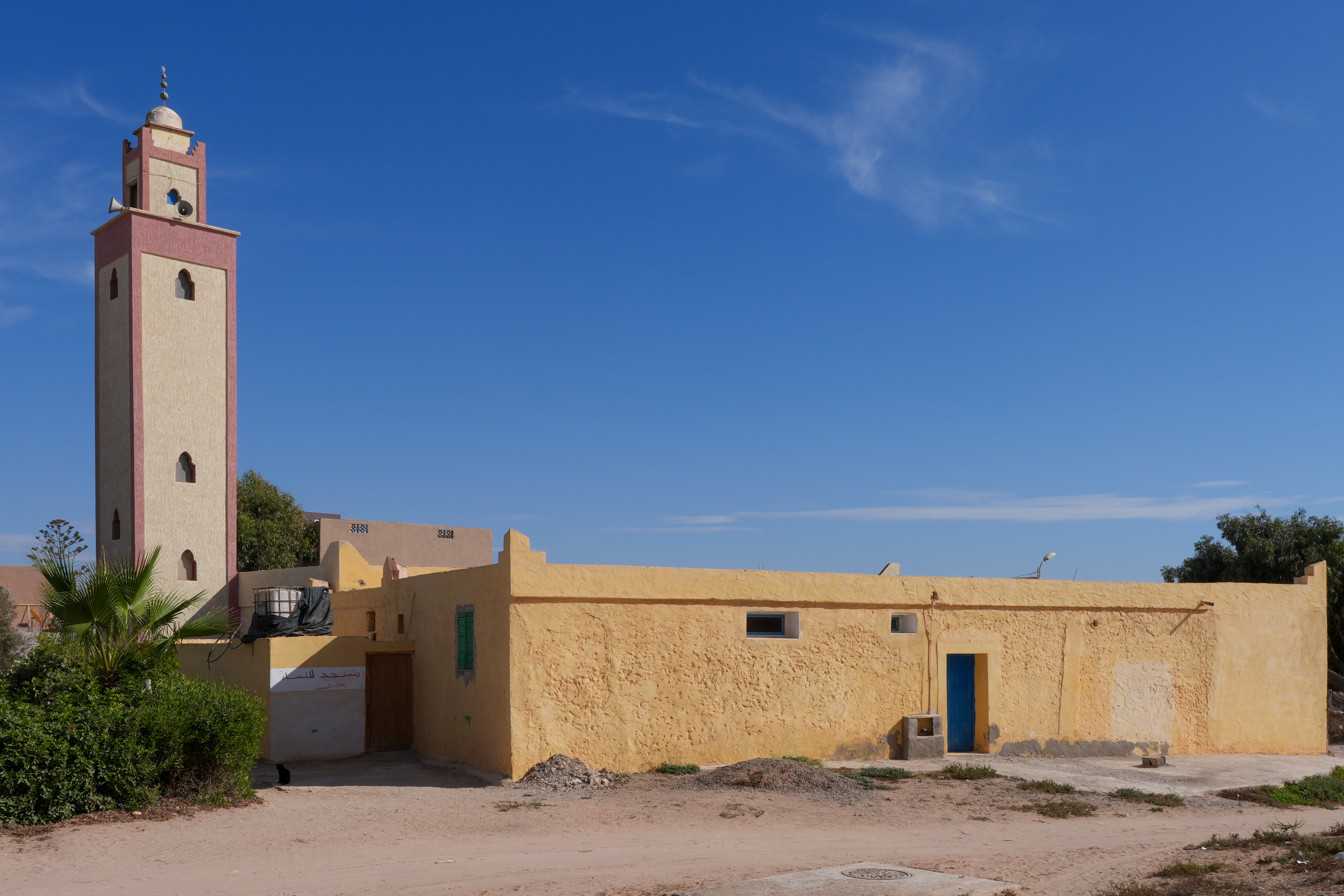
Mosque with typical square minaret

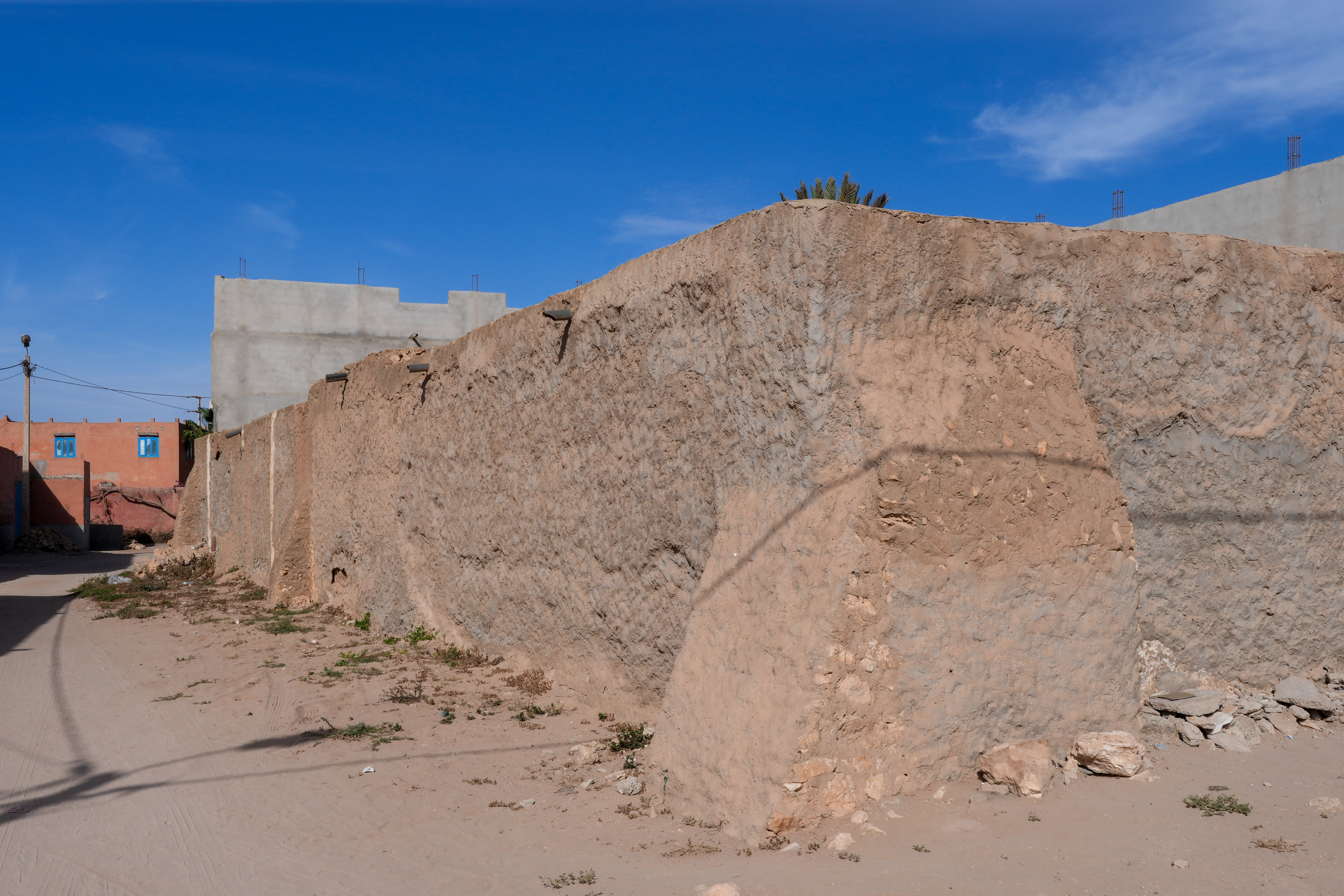
Old compound wall, mud and stone

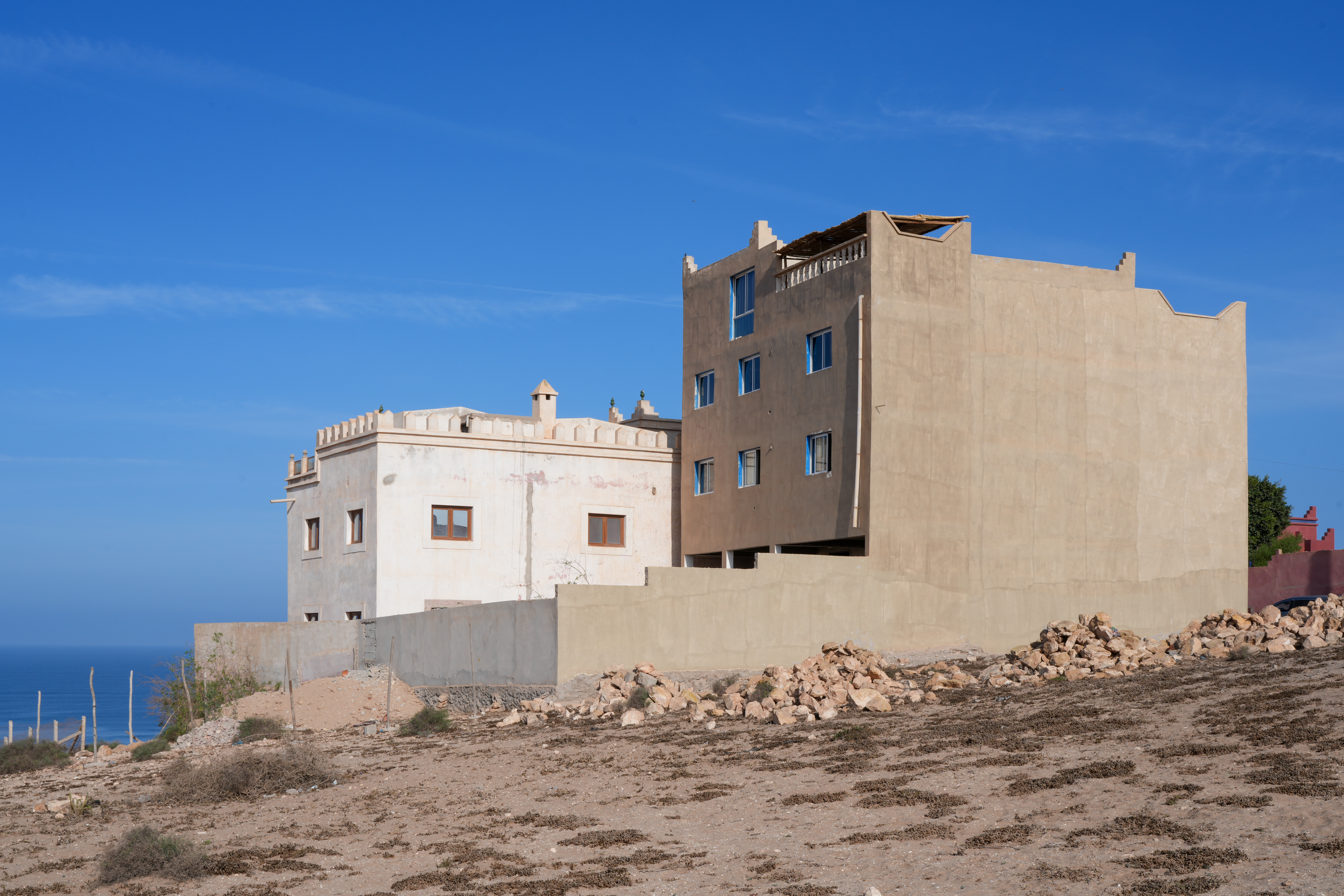
Modern construction, homestay near the beach

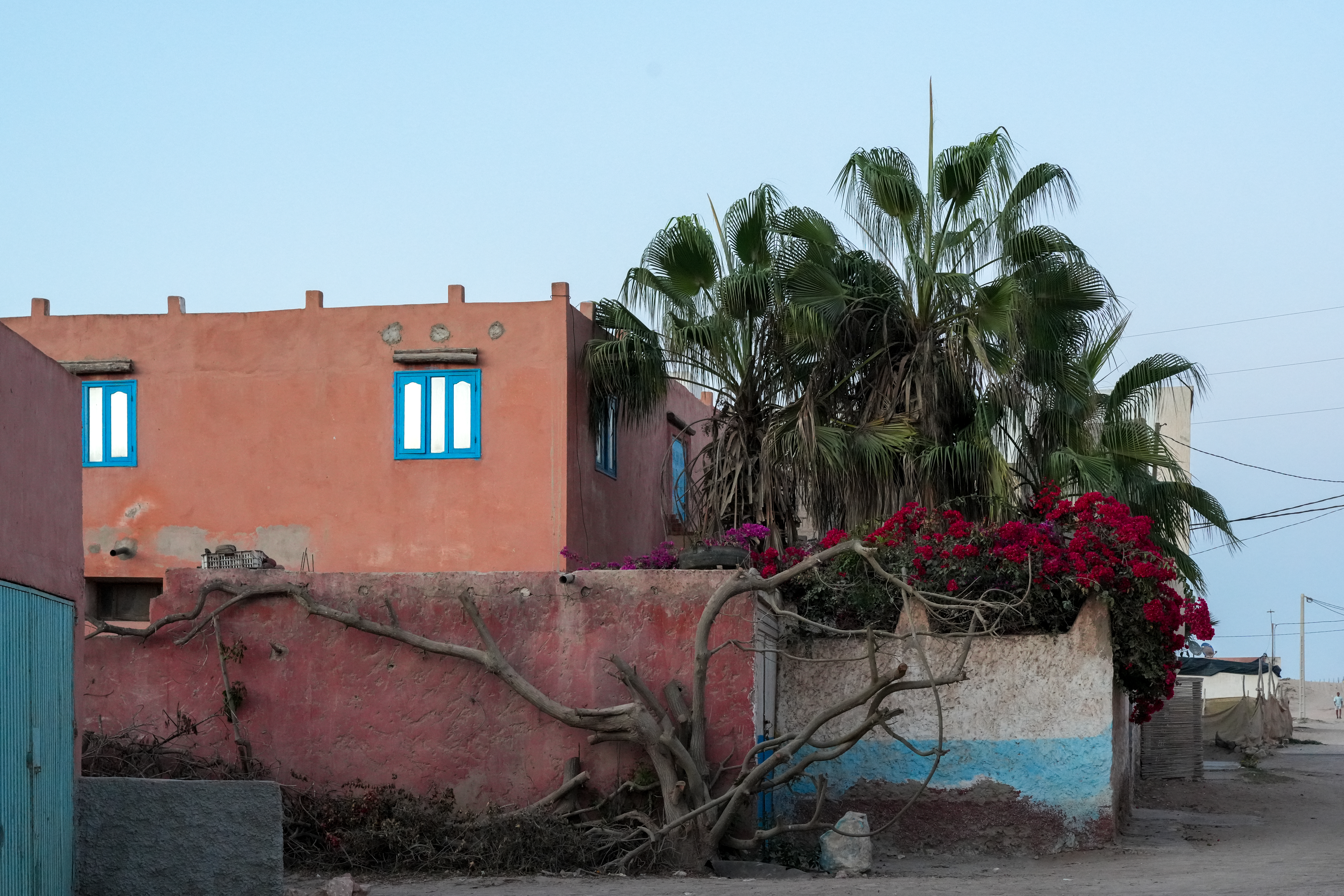
Sparse vegetation, unpaved road

=== Beach and Souss-Massa National Park ===
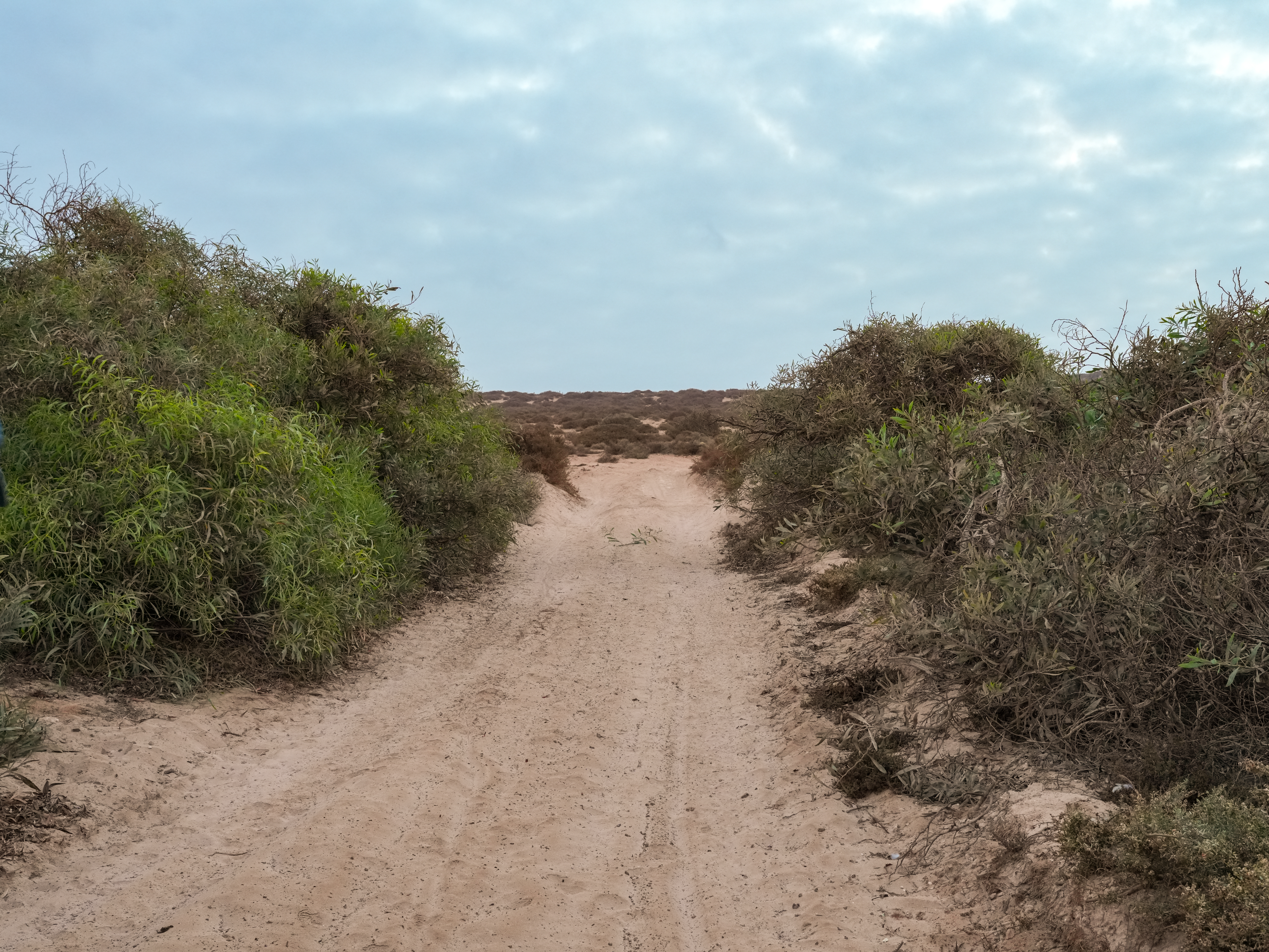
Sandy road down to the beach

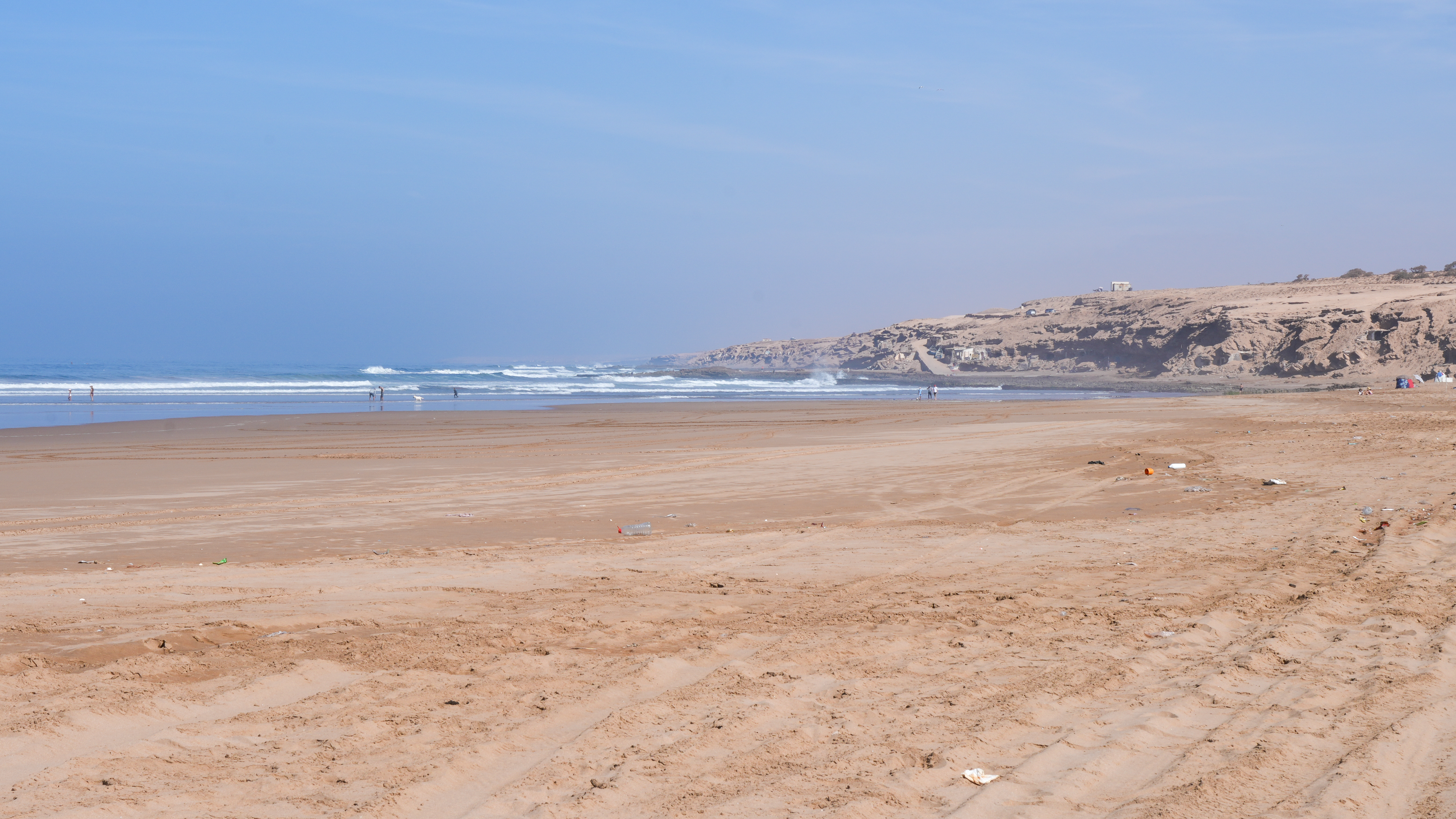
Beach and cliffs

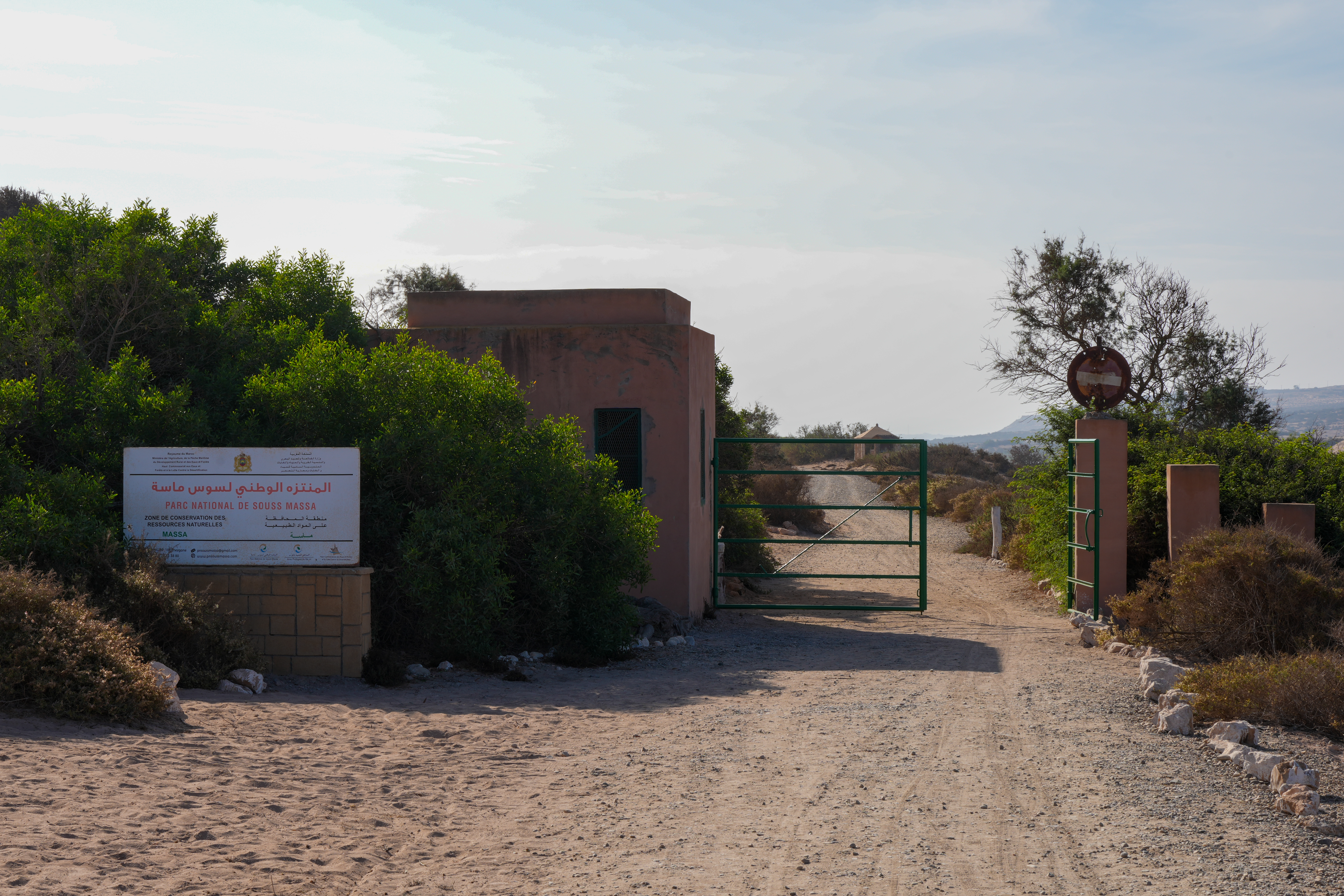
Entrance to the Park from Sidi R'bat beach

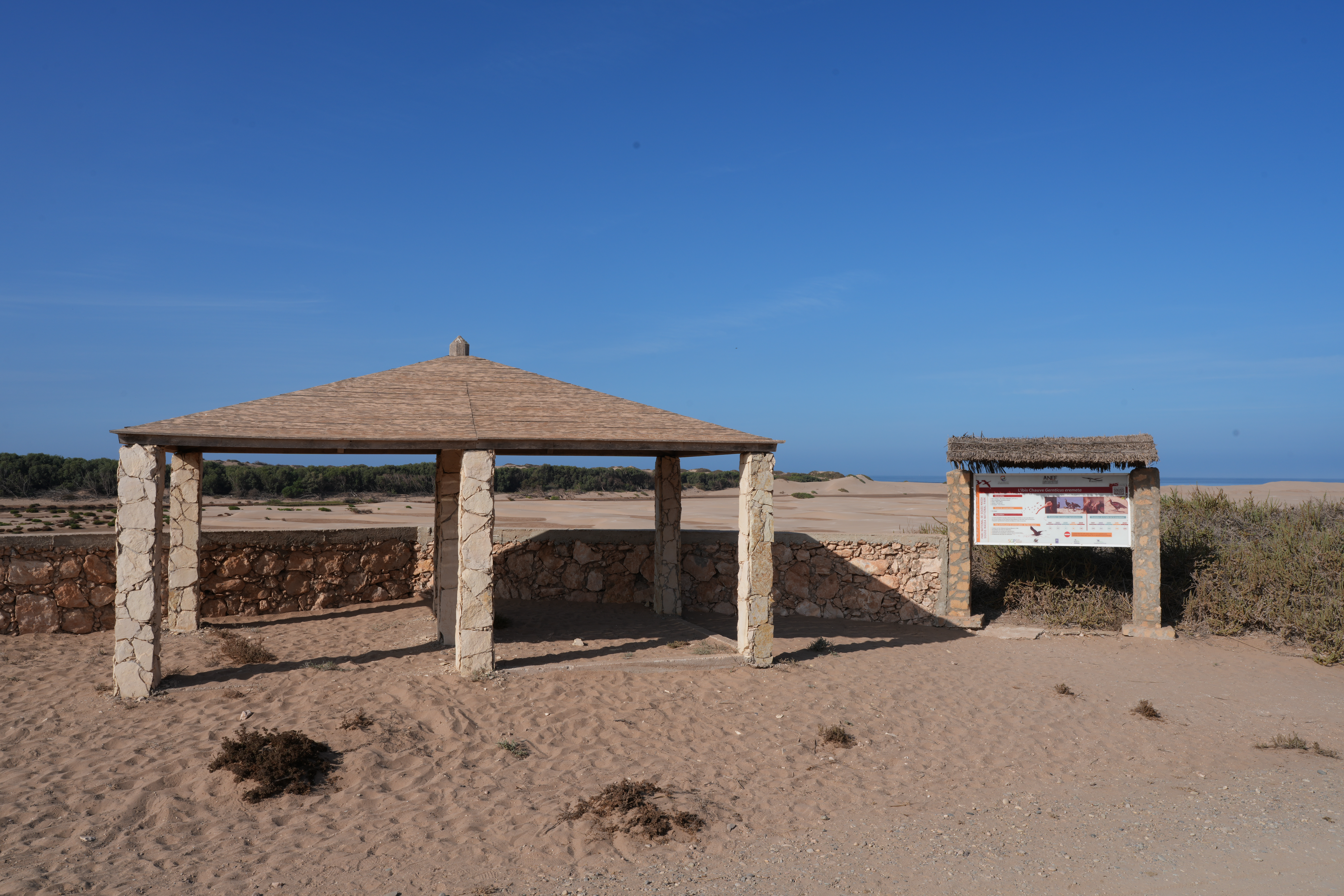
Viewpoint near the Massa delta

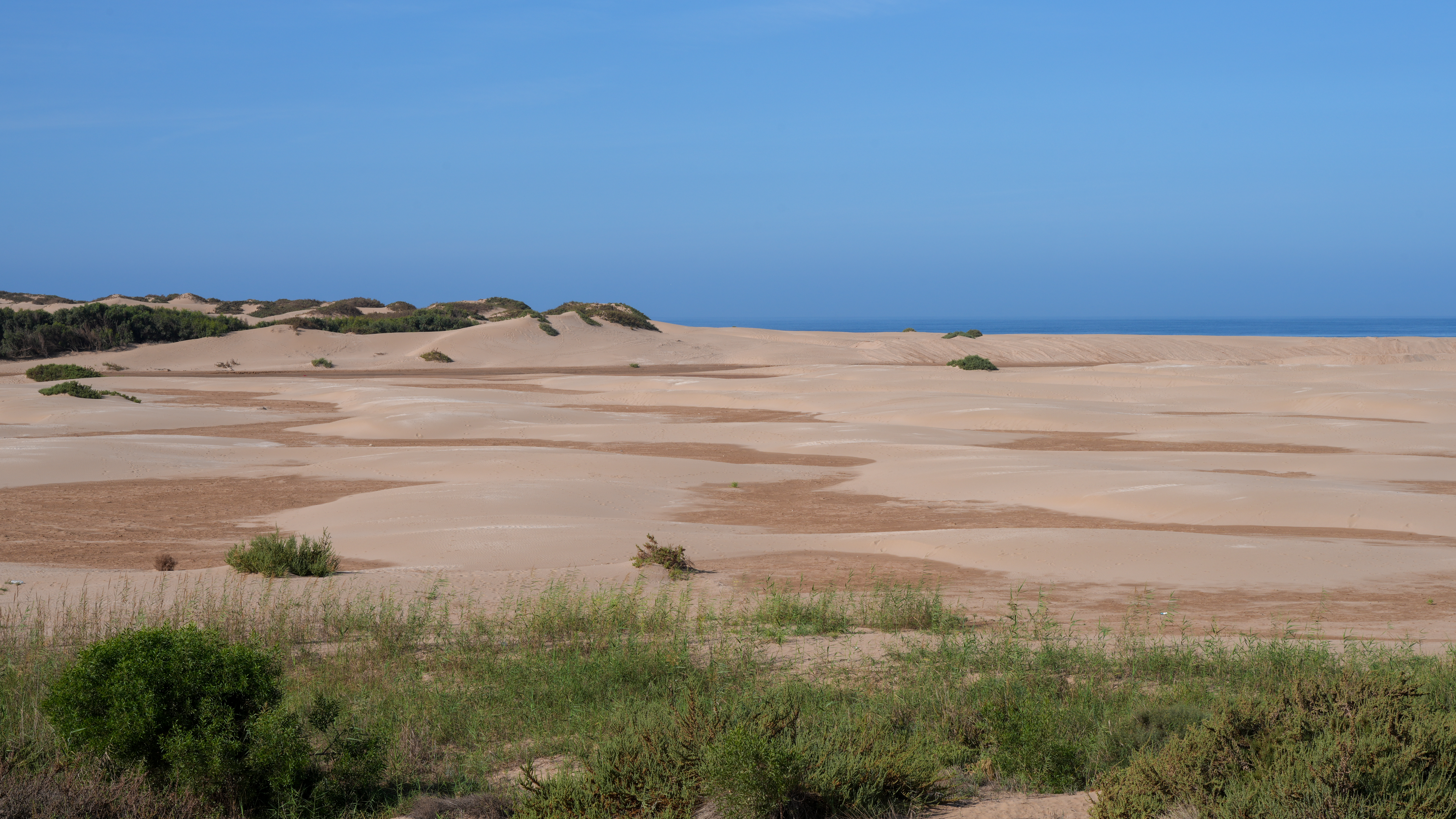
Massa delta

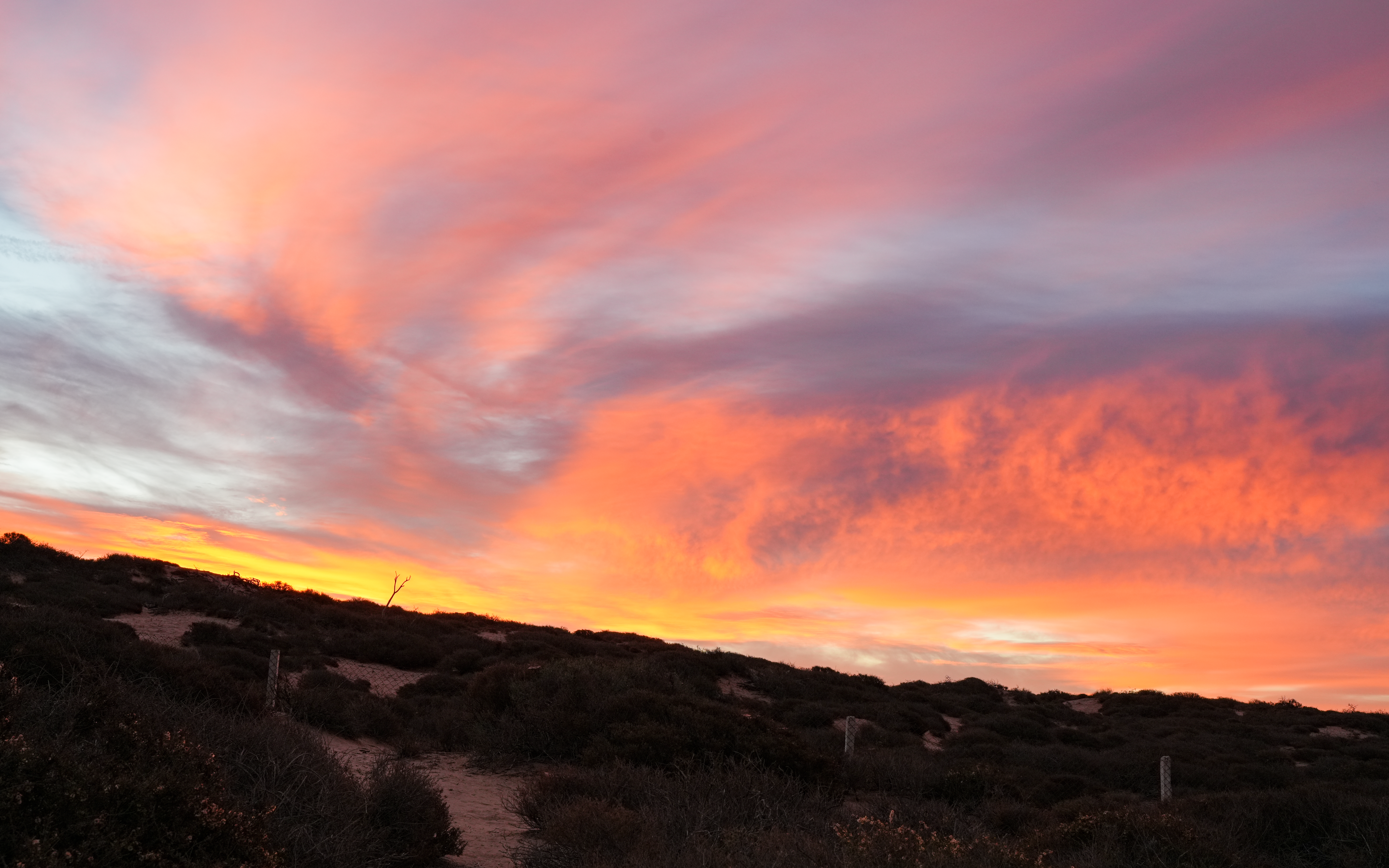
Sunrise from the beach

== See also ==
- Souss-Massa National Park
- Massa River (Morocco)
