= Mässa =

Village in Estonia

Coordinates: 58°00′N 22°11′E

- Village
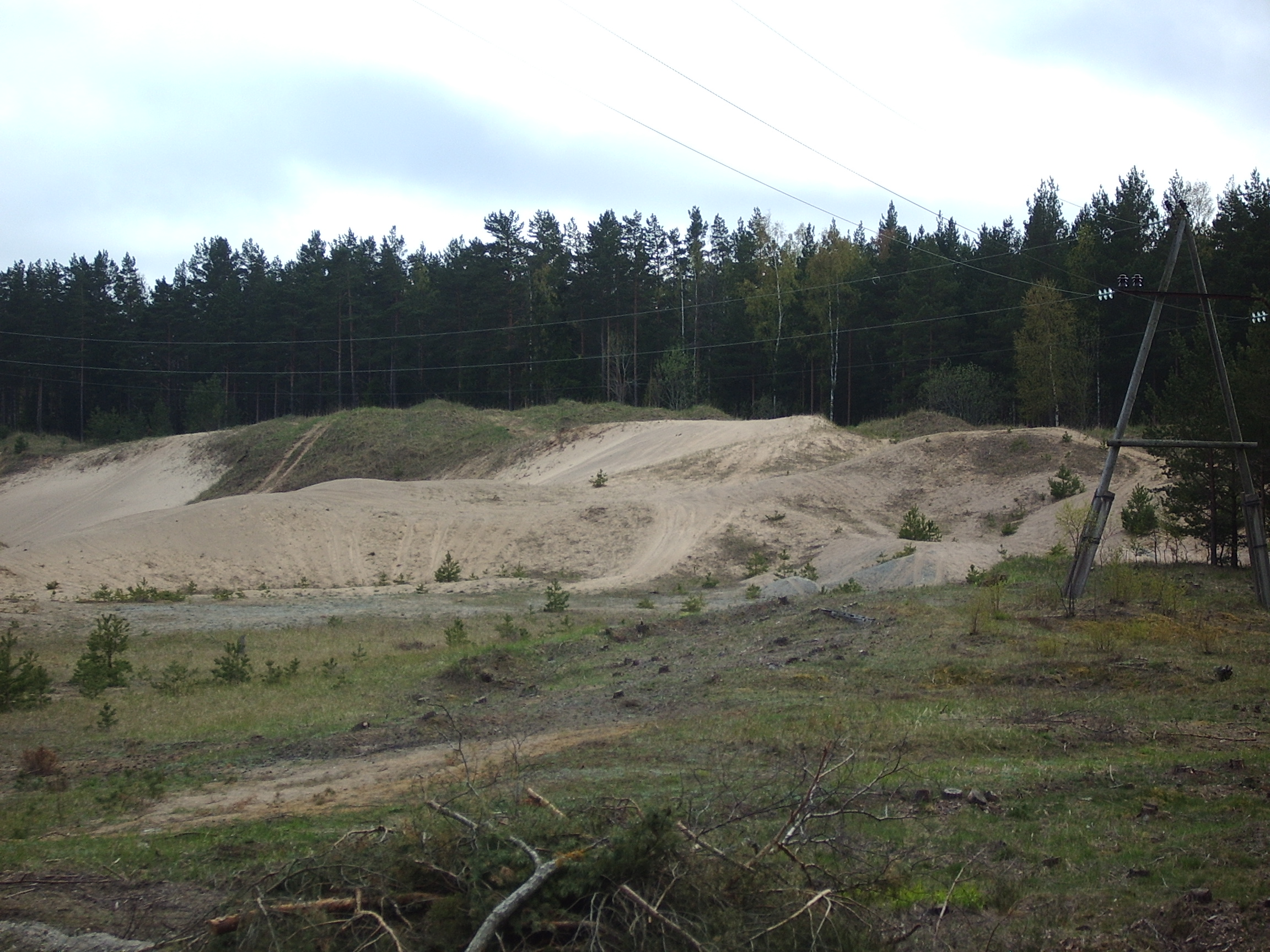
- Former Viieristi sand mine in Mässa village.
- Interactive map of Mässa
- Country: Estonia
- County: Saare County
- Parish: Saaremaa Parish

Population (2011)
  - Total: 11
- Time zone: UTC+2 (EET)
  - Summer (DST): UTC+3 (EEST)

Mässa is a village in Saaremaa Parish, Saare County in western Estonia. As of 2011, the population was 11.
