= La Masa =

La Masa may refer to:

- Giuseppe La Masa (1819-1881), Italian patriot, politician, and soldier
- Italian destroyer Giuseppe La Masa, a destroyer, later torpedo boat, of the Italian Regia Marina (Royal Navy) in commission from 1917 to 1943
- La Masa-class destroyer, a class of eight destroyers of the Italian Regia Marina (Royal Navy)
