= Souss-Massa National Park =

National park in Morocco

Souss-Massa
- IUCN category II (national park)
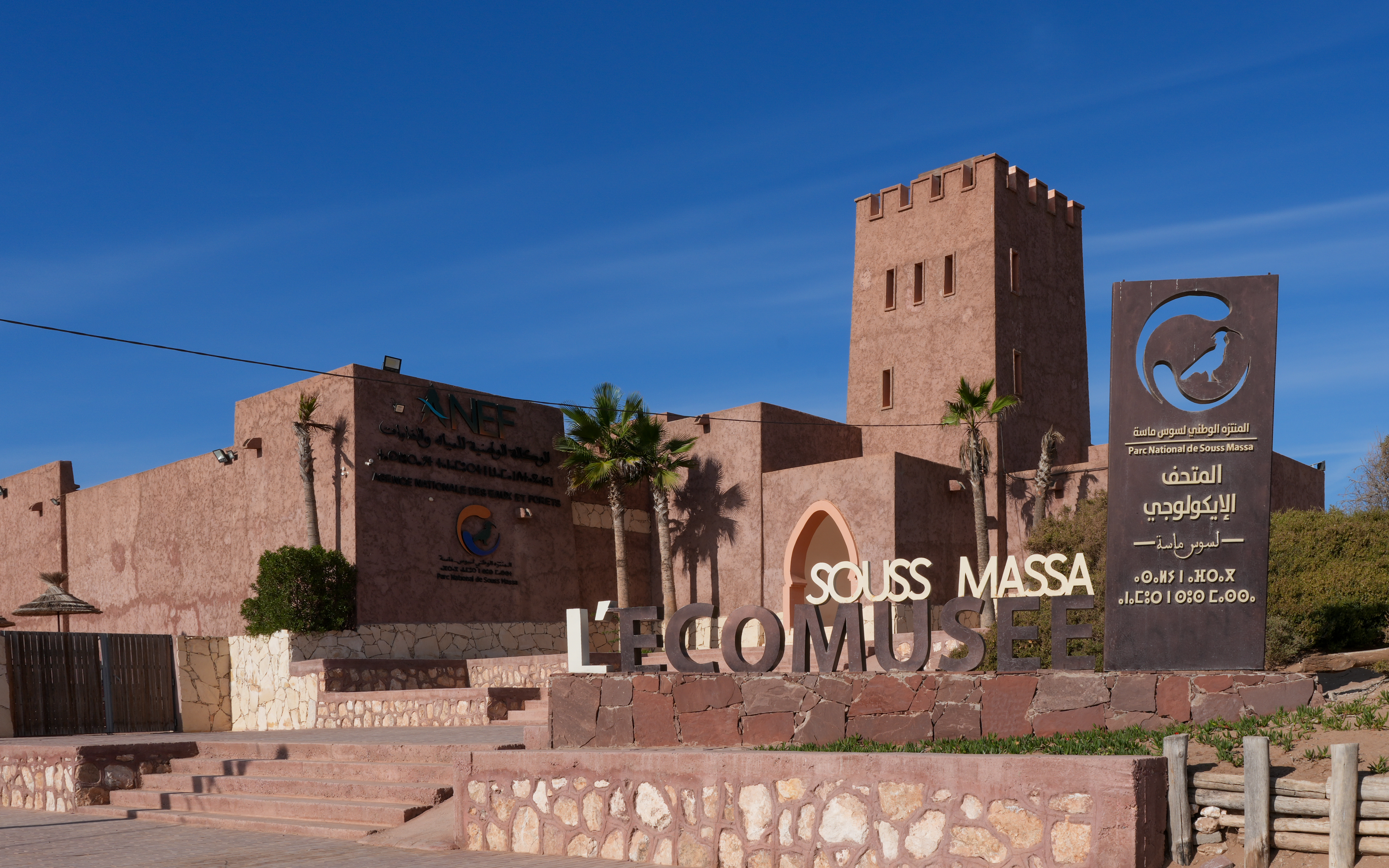
- Visitor centre and Eco Museum at Sidi Birzarn

- Location within Morocco
- Location: Morocco
- Coordinates: 30°04′30″N 9°40′12″W
- Area: 338 km^{2} (131 sq mi)
- Established: 1991

Ramsar Wetland
- Official name: Zones humides de Souss-Massa
- Designated: 15 January 2005
- Reference no.: 1487

The Souss-Massa National Park (Parc National de Souss-Massa) is a 33,800 hectare national park on the Atlantic coast of Morocco which was created in 1991. It lies between Agadir to the north and Sidi Ifni to the south. The estuary of the Oued Souss is the northern limit of the park, the Oued Massa is near the centre, and at the southern end is the town of Aglou. 30,000 ha of land near Aglou, south of the park, is also included in the site because it is sometimes used as a feeding area by the northern bald ibis. The habitat is grazed steppe with dunes, beaches and wetlands. The soil is mainly sandy with some rockier areas. The park is home to around 250 species of birds, 30 mammal species, and 35 species of amphibians and reptiles.

== Fauna ==
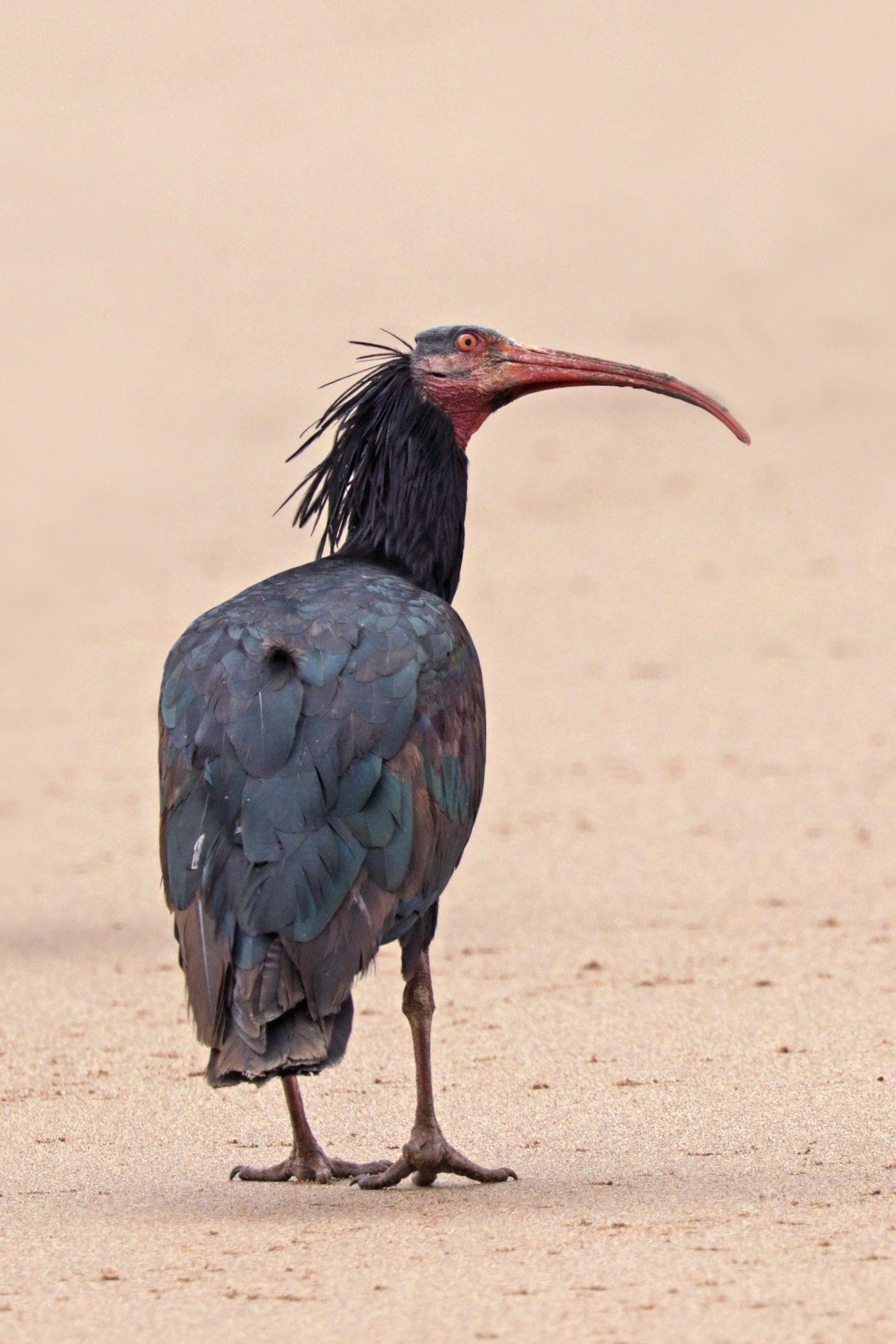
Northern bald ibis

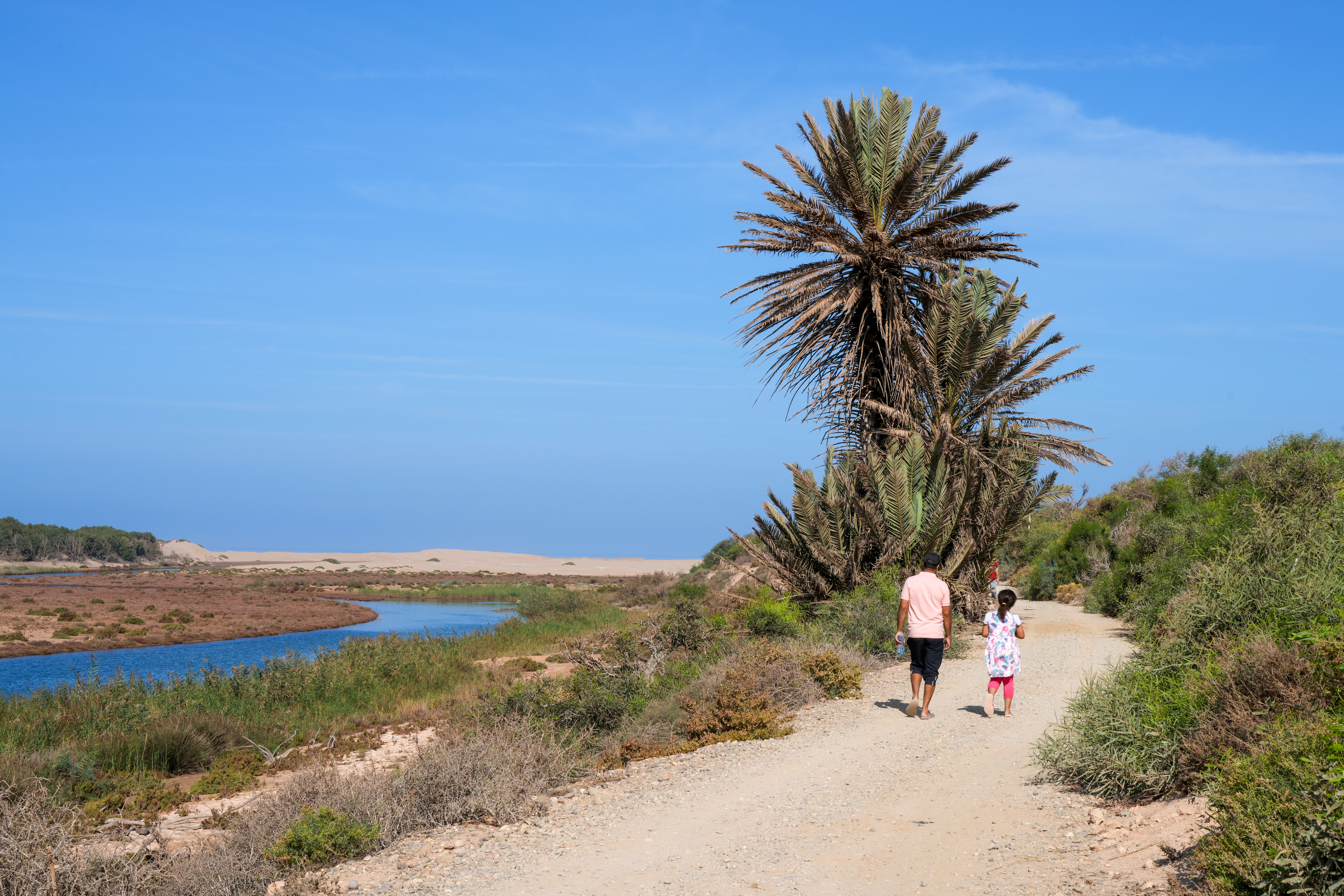
Nature trail along the Massa river, Sidi R'bat

The park's main conservation importance is that it holds three of the four Moroccan colonies of the northern bald ibis (Geronticus eremita). Together with the fourth site at nearby Tamri, it holds 95% of the world's truly wild breeding birds of this endangered species. The ibis colonies and roost-sites are located on coastal cliffs within the National Park, and the coastal steppes and fields are used as feeding areas. The park has a nature trail at Oued Souss and a visitor centre at Oued Massa.

The park is encompassed by the 63,800 ha Parc National de Souss-Massa and Aglou Important Bird Area (IBA), so designated by BirdLife International because it supports significant populations of many bird species. The Oued Massa holds water throughout the year and has breeding marbled ducks, a globally threatened species. It is the only known Moroccan breeding site for the glossy ibis. The two estuaries are important for migrants, especially waders and gulls. European spoonbill and Audouin's gull winter in the park. Other notable breeding bird species are red-necked nightjar, thick-billed lark, Tristram's warbler and Moussier's redstart.

Souss-Massa also holds captive-breeding programmes for four threatened North African ungulates: scimitar oryx, addax, dama gazelle and dorcas gazelle, that are kept in separate enclosures within the park. The reintroduction of the North African ostrich - which is extinct north of the Sahara - is also underway.

=== Gallery of birds ===
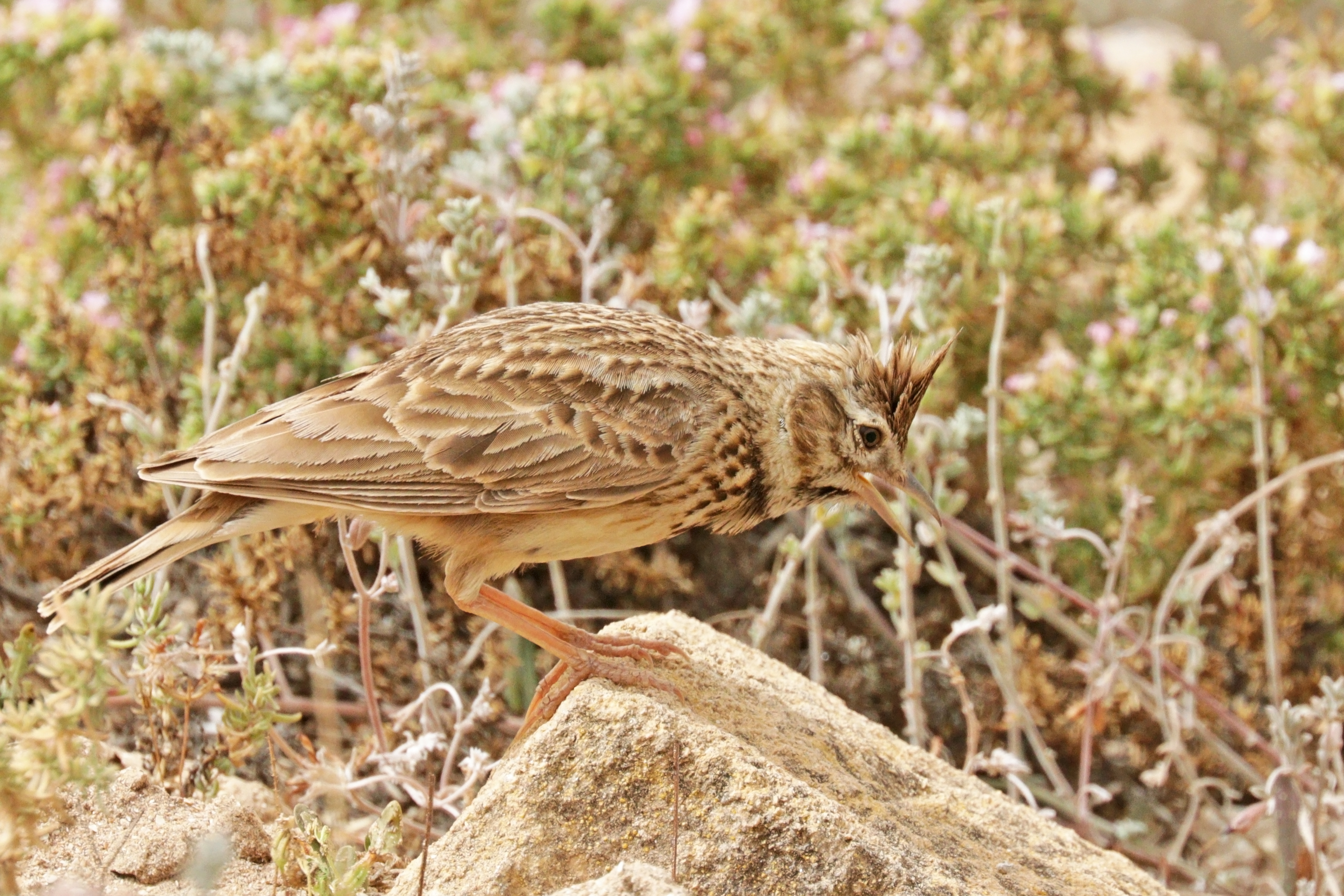
Thekla lark

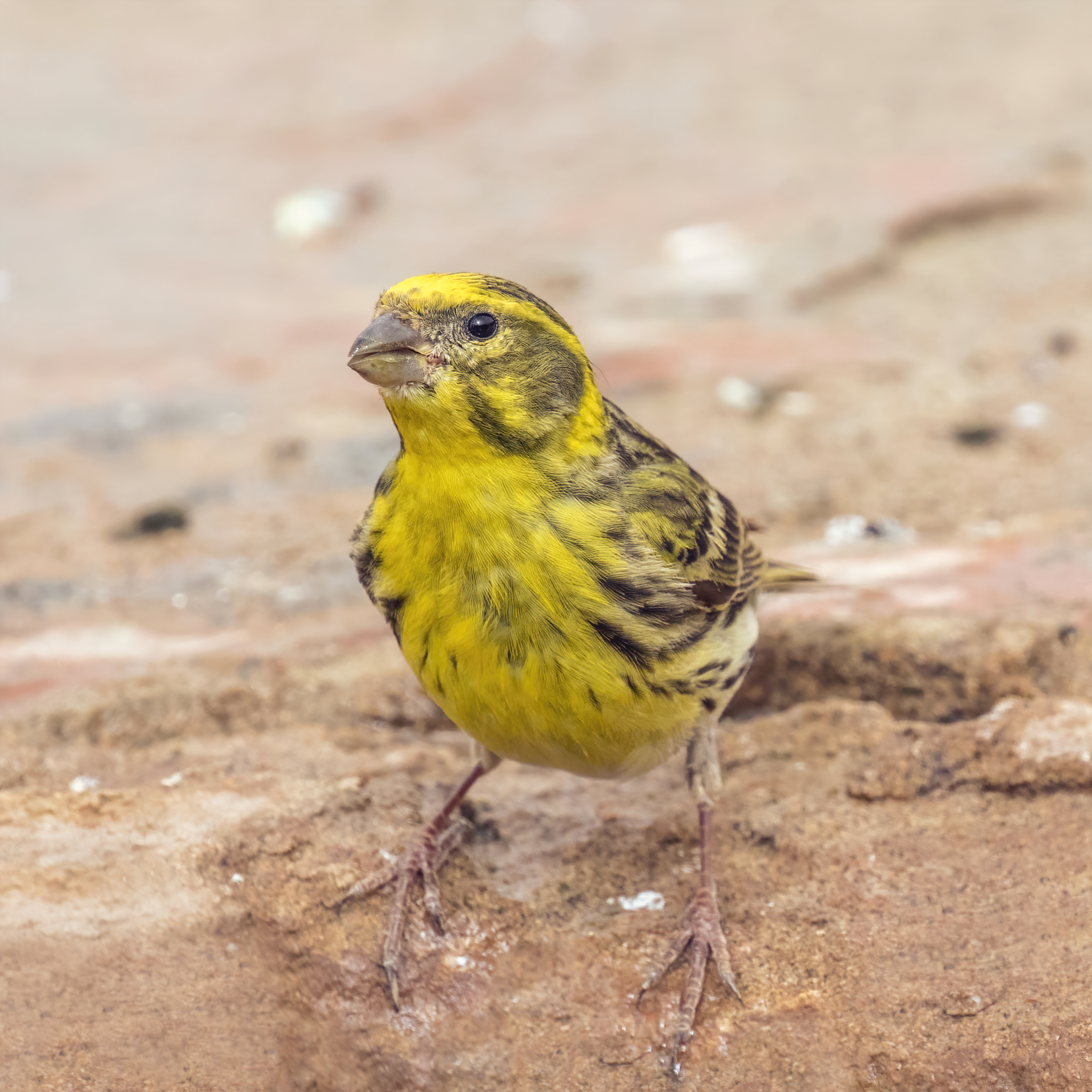
European serin

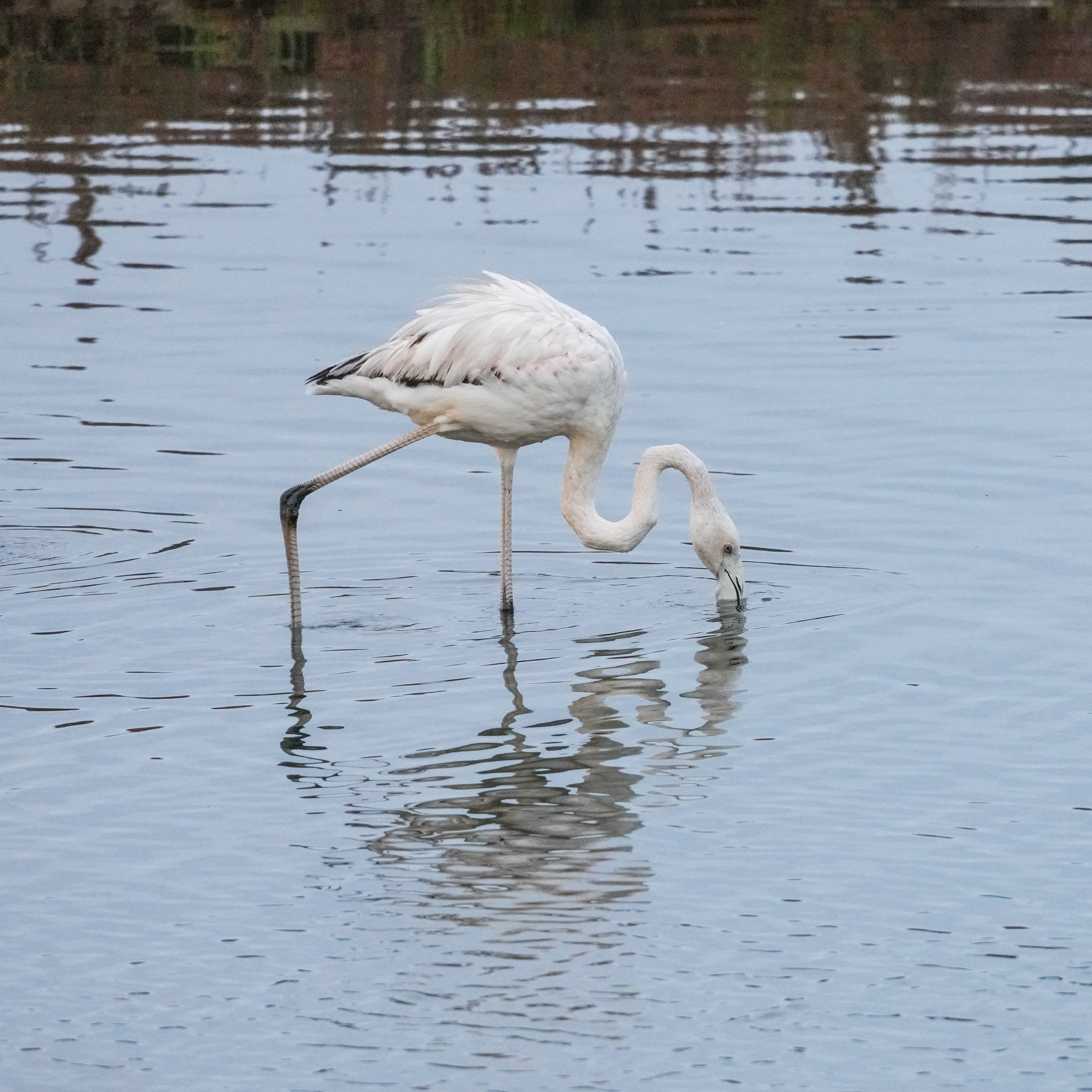
Greater flamingo feeding, Massa river

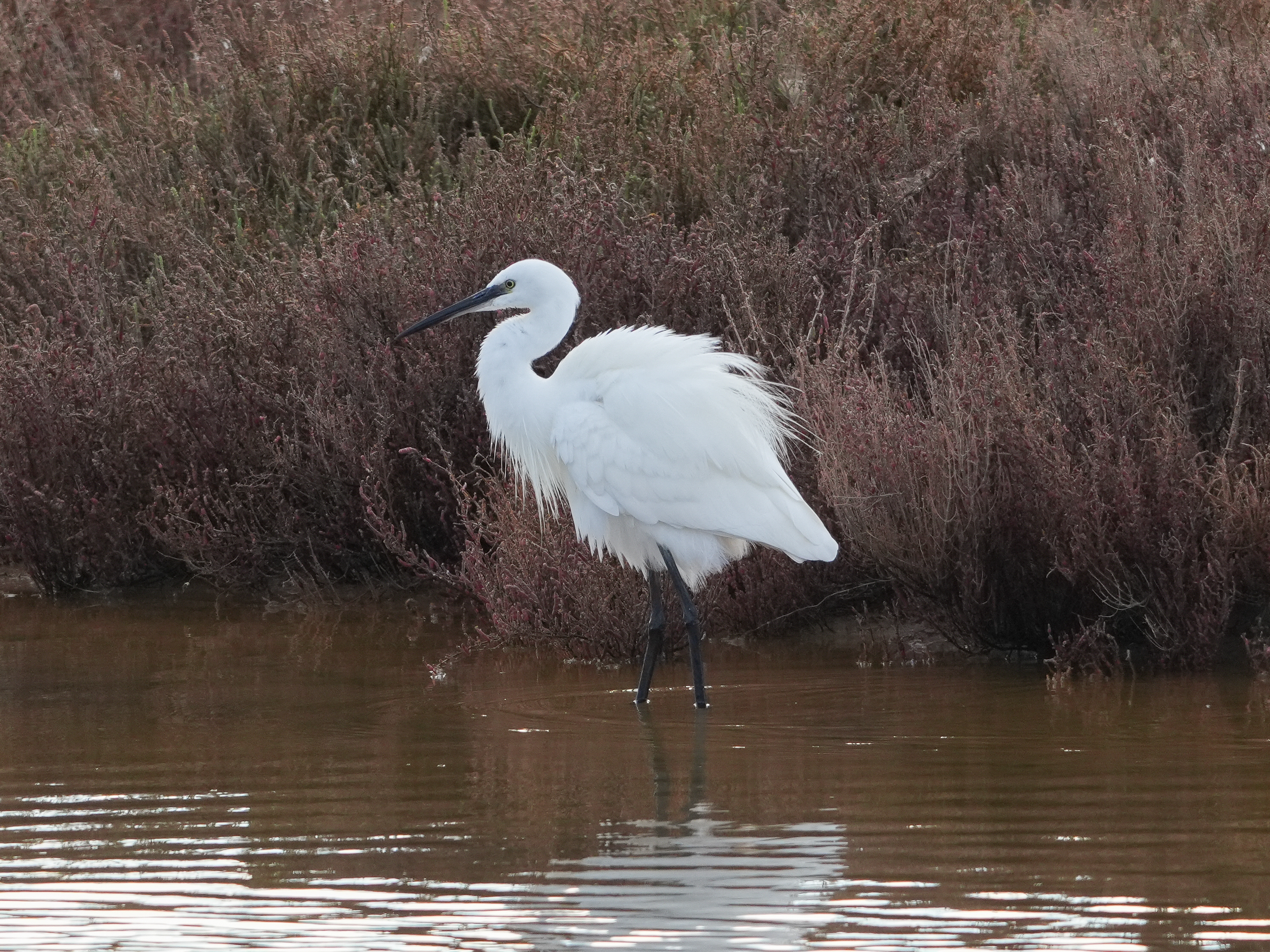
Little egret, Massa river

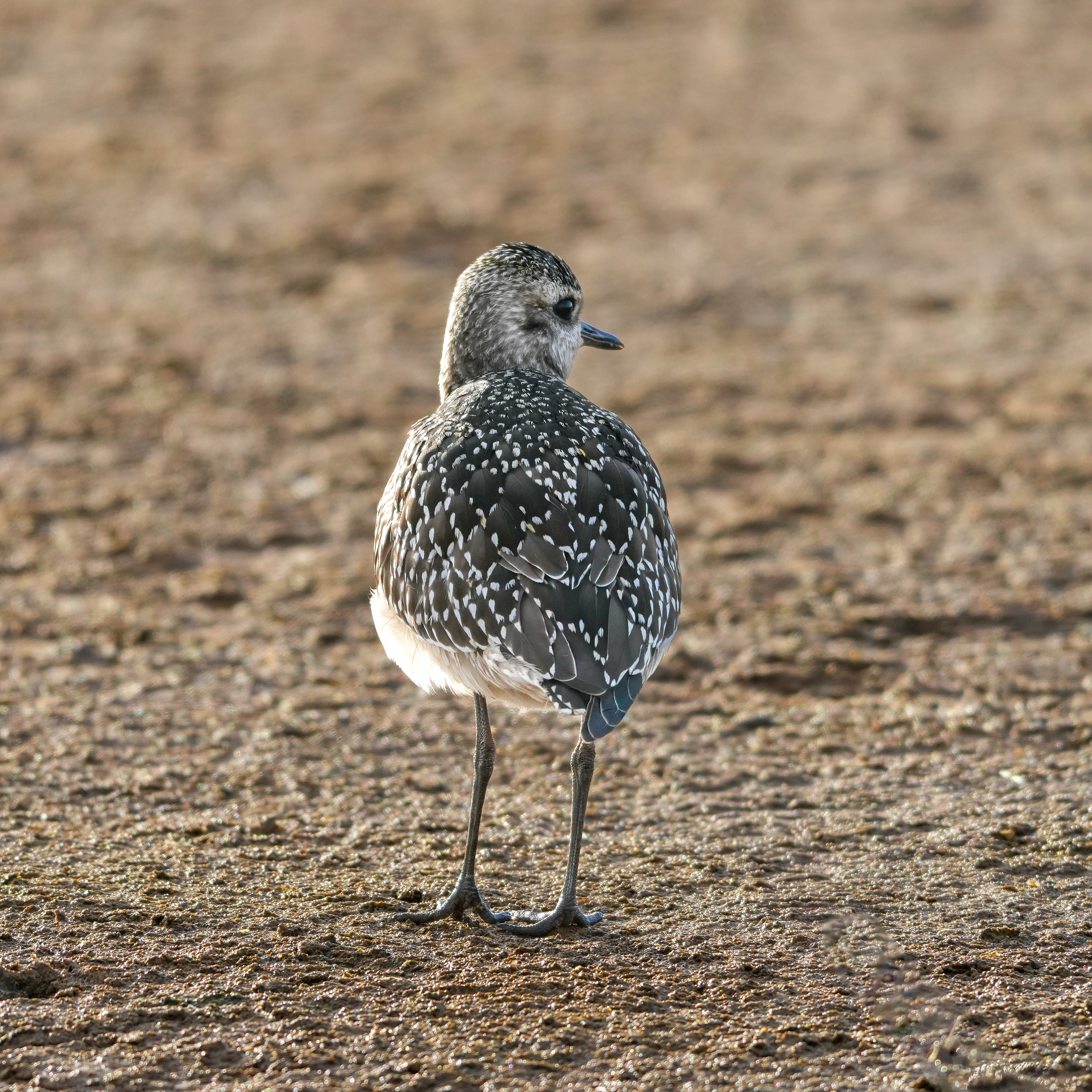
Grey plover (non-breeding)

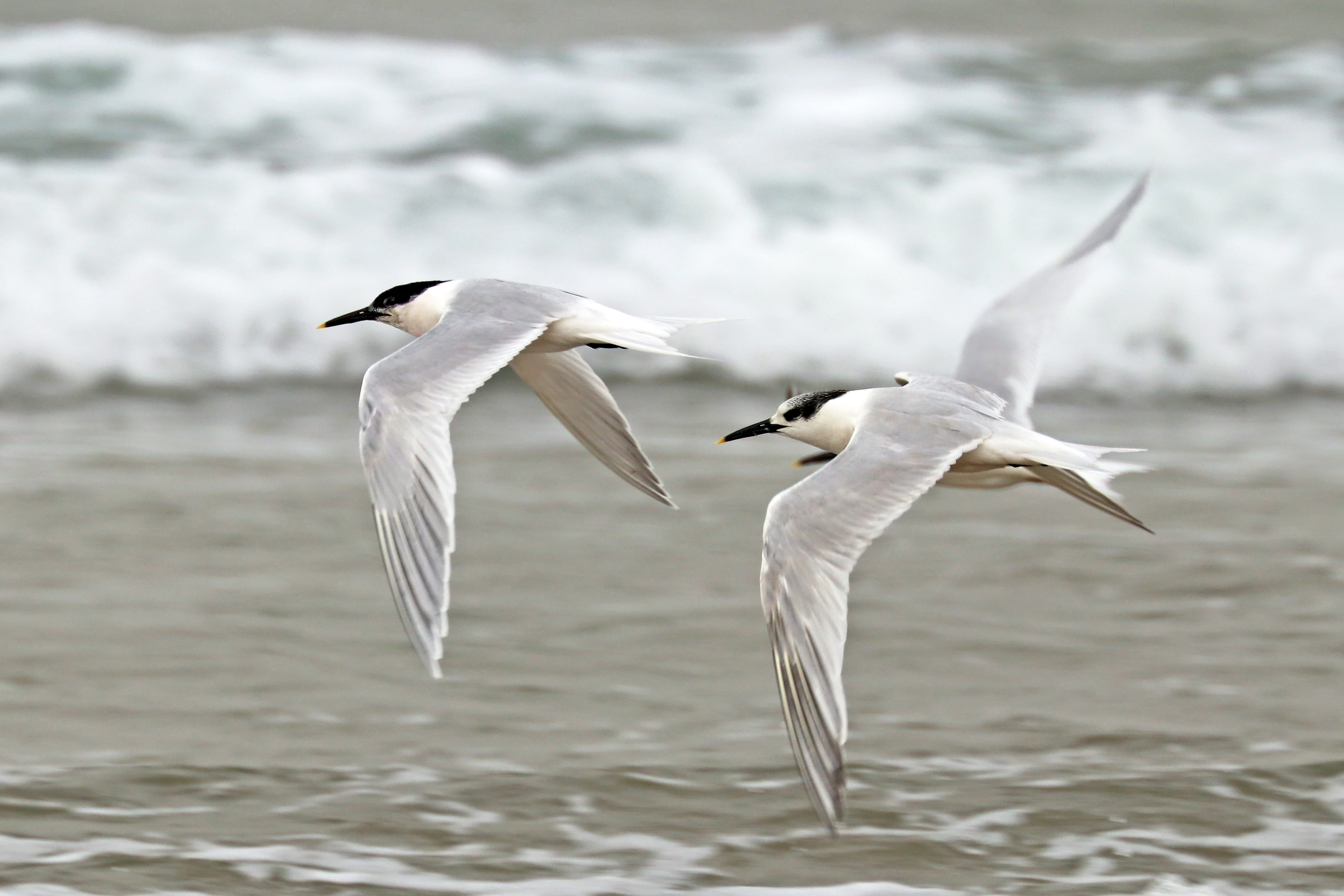
Sandwich terns in flight

== Threats ==
The park is threatened by pressures of the growing human population and the construction of an increasing number of summer chalets around Aglou. A large-scale hotel development that had been planned for the coast at Tifnit, an area that includes important feeding areas for the bald ibis, has been suspended.

== International cooperation ==
In regard to international cooperation and exchanges, the Souss-Massa National Park has received technical support from the Teide National Park (Tenerife, Spain).

== See also ==
- Massa River
- Northern bald ibis
