= Masa GmbH =

German manufacturing company

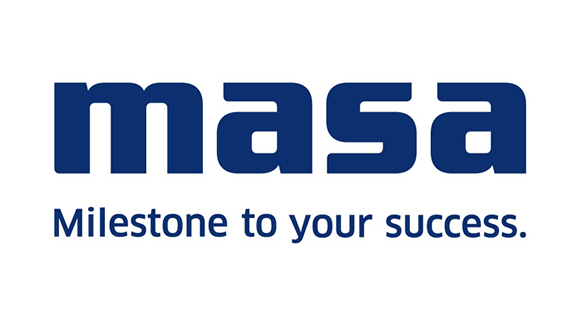
- Masa GmbH logo

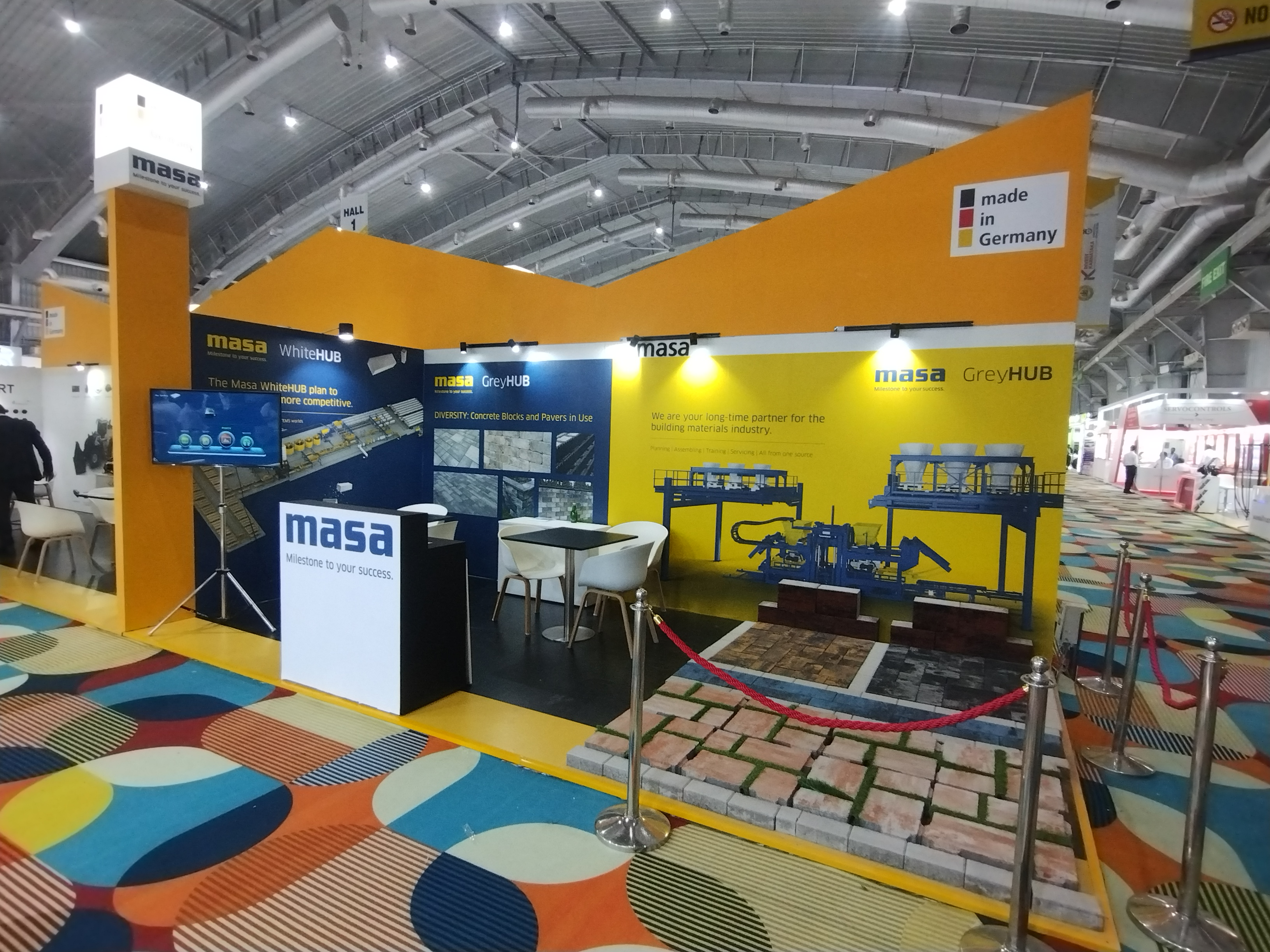
- Masa GmbH at EXCON 2025, BIEC
- Company type: GmbH
- Founded: August 14, 1905; 120 years ago in Andernach, Germany
- Founder: Alois Smaritschnik
- Headquarters: Andernach, Mayen-Koblenz, Germany
- Area served: Germany, USA, UAE, India
- Subsidiaries: Masa WhiteHub and in USA, China, Russia, India and UAE
- Website: www.masa-group.com/en/

Masa GmbH (or the Masa Group) is a German worldwide company in the production of machines and equipment for the concrete block industry.

Masa GmbH participated in EXCON and Bauma exhibitions.

== Company ==
In 2025, Masa GmbH and Hess AAC Systems B.V. combined to form Masa WhiteHub.

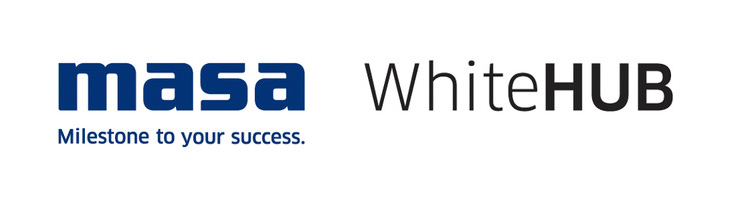
Masa WhiteHub logo
