= Matti (surname) =

Matti is a surname. Notable people with the surname include:

- Andreas Matti (born 1959), Swiss actor
- Erik Matti (born 1965), Filipino filmmaker
- Peter Matti (born 1965), Swiss former slalom canoer
- Ueli Matti (born 1959), Swiss former slalom canoer, brother of Peter Matti
