= Jennifer Mascia =

American writer (born 1977)

- Born: Jennifer Nicole Mascia; November 22, 1977 (age 48); Miami, Florida, U.S.
- Education: Hunter College; Columbia University Graduate School of Journalism
- Occupation: Writer

Jennifer Nicole Mascia (born November 22, 1977, in Miami) is an American writer. She is the author of Never Tell Our Business to Strangers (2010) and a writer at Trace. Until June 10, 2014, she was a regular contributor to The Gun Report, a gun violence project spearheaded by the Op-Ed columnist Joe Nocera.

Mascia is a graduate of City University of New York's Hunter College and Columbia University Graduate School of Journalism.

In February 2010, Mascia published Never Tell Our Business to Strangers, a memoir about her parents that centers around the discovery of her father's murder conviction. The memoir is an expansion of a Modern Love column published in the Times on April 1, 2007.
