= Massa River (Morocco) =

Coordinates: 30°04′15″N 9°40′00″W

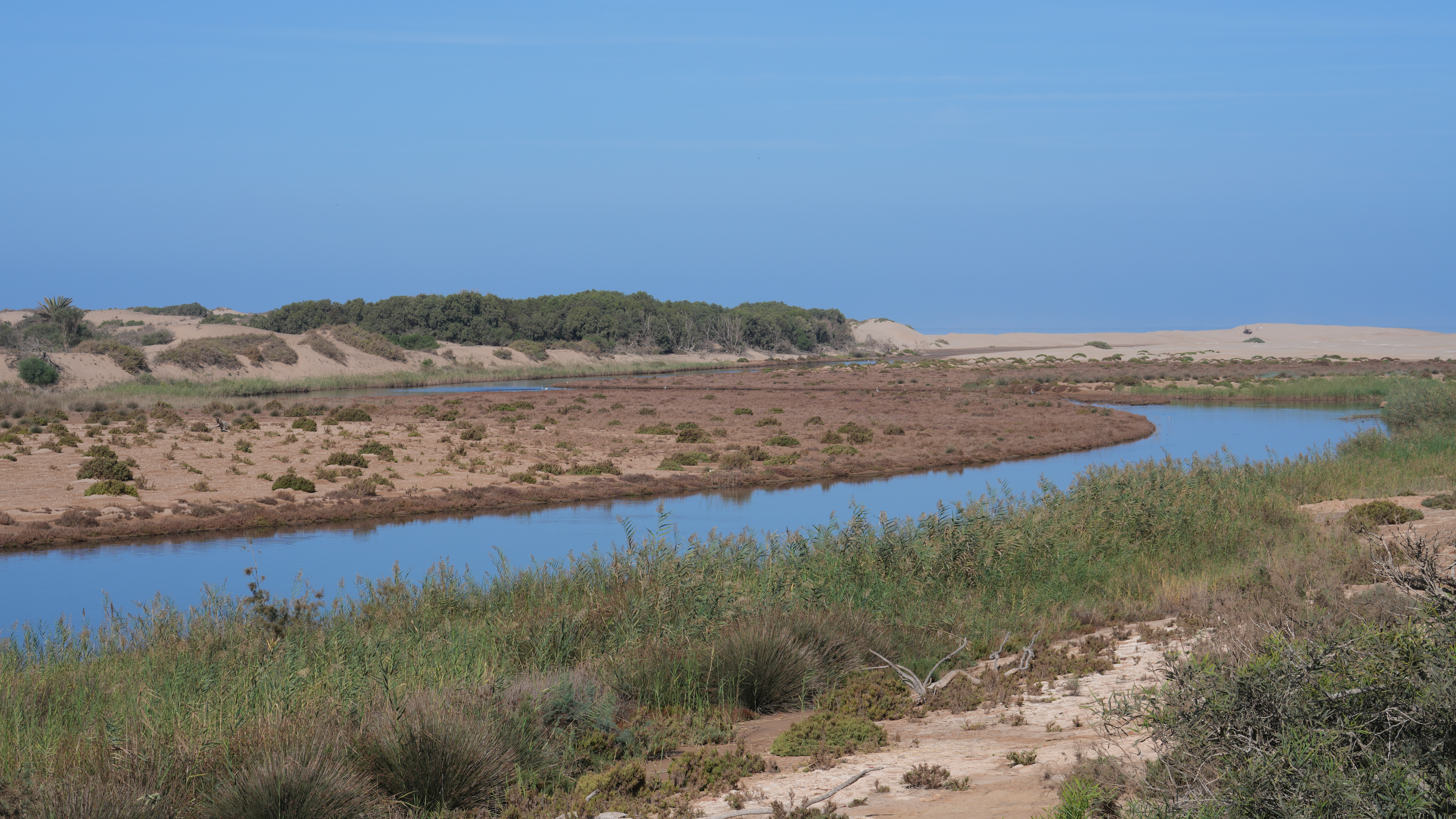
- Massa River near the ocean at Sidi R'bat

Location
- Country: Morocco

Physical characteristics
- Source
  - location: Anti-Atlas
- Mouth
  - location: Atlantic Ocean

The Massa River (Arabic: واد ماسة, romanized: wād māsa; Tachelhit: ⴰⵙⵉⴼ ⵏ ⵎⴰⵙⵙⵜ, romanized: asif n masst) is a river in southern Morocco located in the Sous region. It originates in the Anti-Atlas and flows northwest ending in the Atlantic Ocean at Sidi R'bat after flowing through the Souss-Massa National Park.

== Yusuf Ibn Tashfin Dam ==
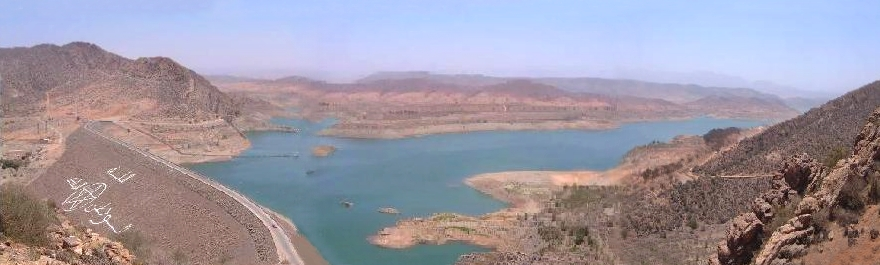
Yusuf Ibn Tashfin Dam

Constructed in 1972, the Yusuf Ibn Tashfin dam is the main dam on the Massa river.

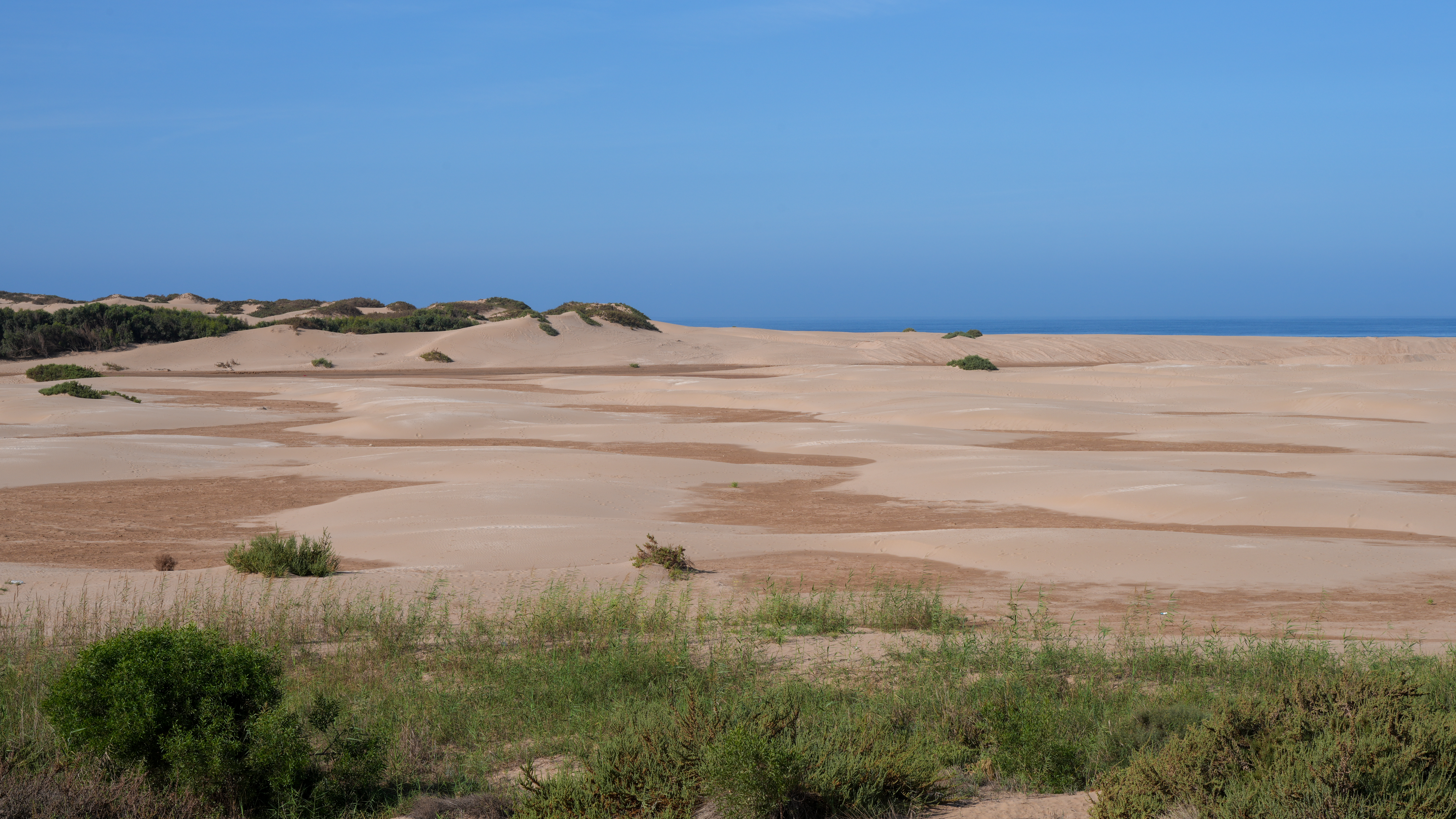
Delta of the Massa at Sidi R'bat

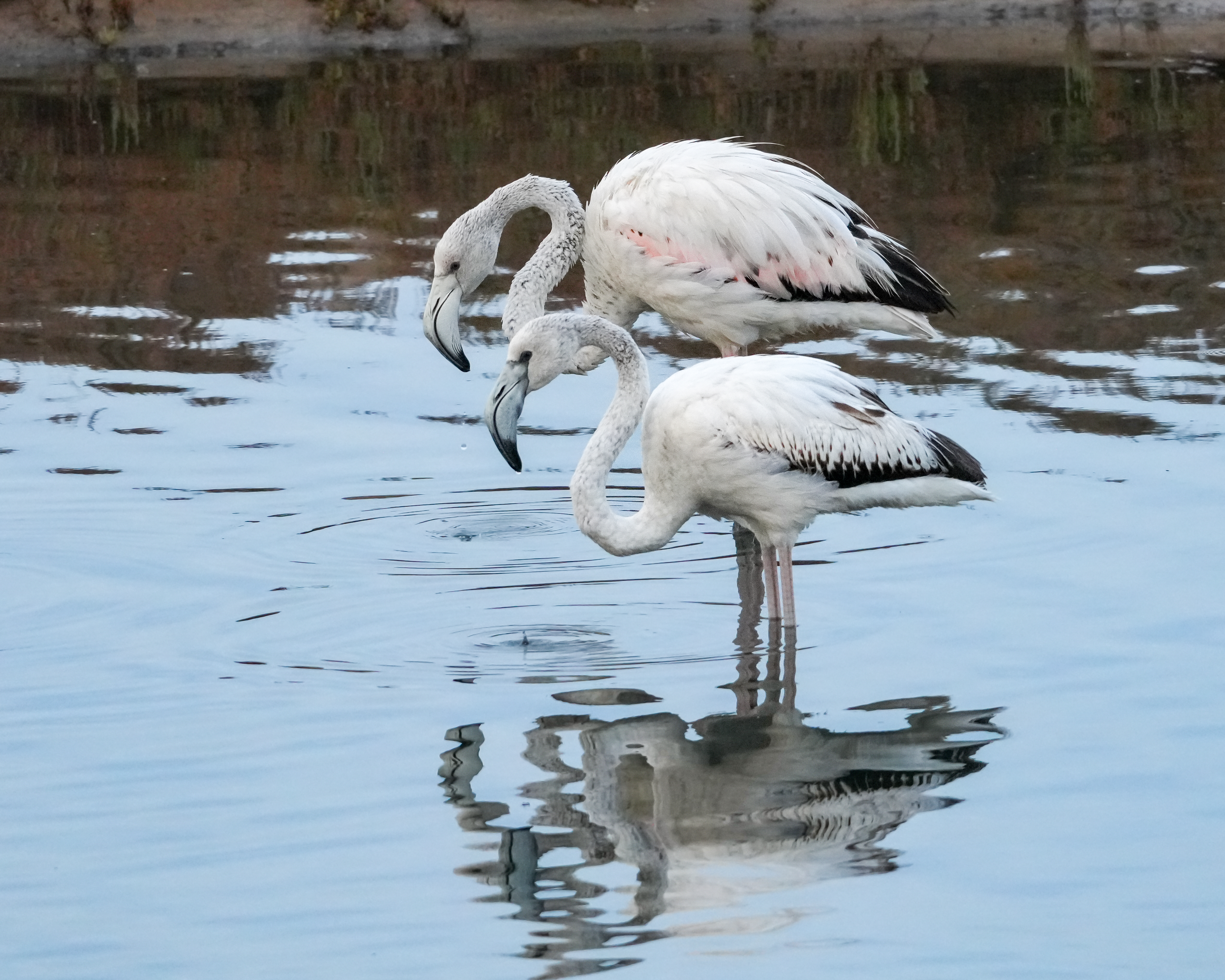
Greater flamingos foraging in the Massa

== See also ==
- Northern bald ibis
- Souss-Massa National Park
- Chtouka Ait Baha
