= 96th =

96th is the ordinal form of the number 96. 96th or Ninety-sixth may also refer to:

- A fraction, 1/96, equal to one of 96 equal parts

== Geography ==
- 96th meridian east, a line of longitude
- 96th meridian west, a line of longitude
- 96th Street (disambiguation)

== Military ==
- 96th Brigade (disambiguation)
- 96th Division (disambiguation)
- 96th Regiment of Foot
- 96th Squadron (disambiguation)

== Other ==
- 96th century
- 96th century BC

== See also ==
- April 6, 96th day of the year in a standard year
- 96 (disambiguation)
