= 96th Regiment =

96th Regiment may refer to:

- 96th Regiment of Foot (disambiguation), British Army
- 96th Fighter-Bomber Aviation Regiment
- 96th Infantry Regiment (France)
- 96th Engineer Battalion, also known as the 96th Engineer General Service Regiment
- 96th Heavy Anti-Aircraft Regiment, Royal Artillery

== American Civil War regiments ==
- 96th Illinois Infantry Regiment
- 96th Indiana Infantry Regiment
- 96th New York Infantry Regiment
- 96th Ohio Infantry Regiment
- 96th Pennsylvania Infantry Regiment

== See also ==
- 96th Brigade (disambiguation)
- 96th Division (disambiguation)
