= 96th Street =

96th Street may refer to the following places in New York City, United States:

- 96th Street (Manhattan)
- 96th Street station (IRT Broadway–Seventh Avenue Line)
- 96th Street station (IND Eighth Avenue Line)
- 96th Street station (IRT Lexington Avenue Line)
- 96th Street station (Second Avenue Subway)

== See also ==
- LAX/Metro Transit Center, Los Angeles, known as Aviation/96th Street station in planning
