= 96th Regiment of Foot (disambiguation) =

Six regiments of the British Army have been numbered the 96th Regiment of Foot:

- 96th Regiment of Foot (1760), raised in 1760, disbanded 1763
- 96th Regiment of Foot (British Musketeers), raised in 1780
- 96th Regiment of Foot (1793), raised in 1793. numbered 96th in 1794, disbanded 1796.
- 96th Regiment of Foot, formed in 1803 from the 2nd Battalion, 52nd Regiment
- 96th (Queen's Own Germans) Regiment of Foot, renumbered from the 97th in 1816
- 96th Regiment of Foot, raised in 1824
