= 2024 New York City Subway derailment =

Train accident in New York City

2024 96th Street derailment
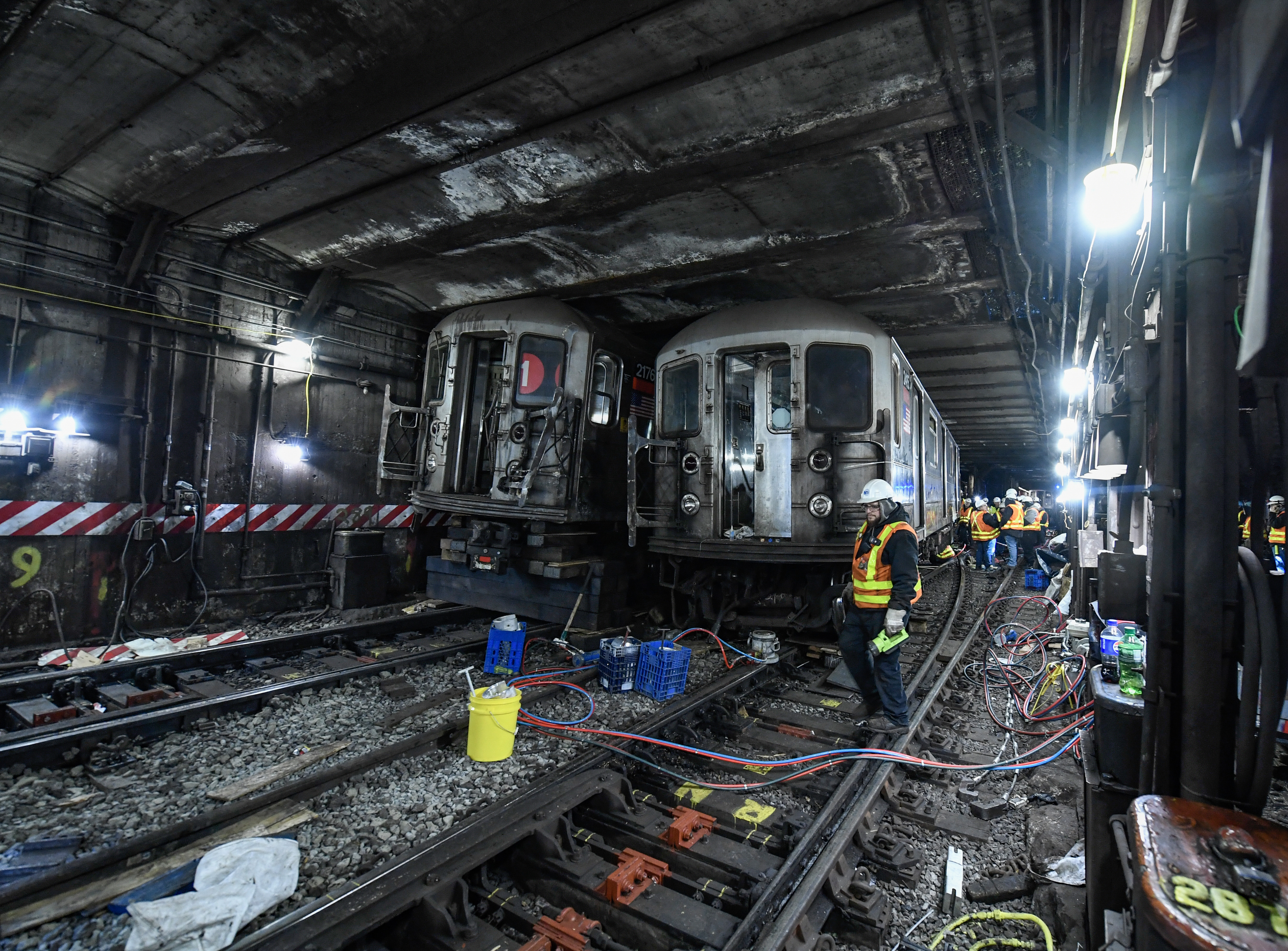
- The site of the derailment

Details
- Date: January 4, 2024 c. 3:00 p.m. EST
- Location: Near 96th Street station, Upper West Side, Manhattan, New York City
- Coordinates: 40°47′42″N 73°58′17″W
- Country: United States
- Line: IRT Broadway–Seventh Avenue Line
- Operator: New York City Subway
- Incident type: Derailment
- Cause: Under investigation

Statistics
- Trains: 2
- Passengers: Approximately 300
- Deaths: 0
- Injured: 25

On January 4, 2024, a New York City Subway train derailed causing at least 26 people, mostly passengers, to suffer minor injuries. The incident happened when the first car of a 1 train collided with a disabled train that had been vandalized, both consisting of R62As, just north of the 96th Street station. Around 300 people were evacuated off the train involved in the collision.

The National Transportation Safety Board, Metropolitan Transportation Authority, and other authorities are investigating the incident. They said that the disabled train, which was heading uptown, had been taken out of service because a passenger repeatedly pulled the emergency brake, resulting in the train being stalled near West 79th Street. That train was taken out of service, and the moving train, which was trying to bypass the stalled train using the express track, hit it while switching to the local track.

== Incident ==
At 2:11 p.m. EST, train 1345 performed an emergency stop due to an unruly passenger pulling emergency brake valve cords on the first five railcars. It was stated that a "good Samaritan" alerted two K-9 officers when the incident happened. The operator was unable to reset the emergency brakes and subsequently moved to the 79th Street Station to drop off passengers. A railcar inspector was also unable to reset the brakes, forcing the train to be taken out of service and moved to a railyard by using the local track (track 4). The incident forced 1 trains to be rerouted via the express track (track 3).

The out-of-service train was being operated from car six in the middle of the consist by a transit system supervisor. A flagger, who was in the lead car helping to coordinate the train's movement, said that he lost radio communications with the supervisor near the 96th Street station. Consequently, the supervisor did not receive the command to stop prior to the signal requiring them to do so at the end of the station. Trip stops did not activate due to the disabled brakes.

The collision occurred around 3:00 p.m. EST when a northbound 1 train, train 1427, was switching from the express to the local track and sideswiped by train 1345. Two cars of train 1345 derailed while train 1427 had three cars derail. Train 1427 was carrying 300 passengers at the time and had to be evacuated.

Car 2176, which was the lead car of train 1345, was significantly damaged in the collision. The car was written off and is now being used for parts. The remaining four cars in the 5-car set were linked with car 1934, which was previously assigned to the 6.

== Aftermath ==
The derailment caused significant disruptions along the IRT Broadway–Seventh Avenue Line. MTA officials said on January 5 that the disruptions would continue throughout the day, hoping that service would be restored later that day. 1 train service was suspended between 137th Street–City College and Times Square–42nd Street, 2 trains ran along the IRT Lexington Avenue Line, and 3 trains were suspended between 135th Street and Times Square–42nd Street. 1 trains ran express in the southbound direction while 3 trains ran local in the southbound direction between Times Square-42nd Street and Chambers Street for the duration of service disruptions. Some 4 and 5 trains made local stops in Brooklyn and 5 trains in the Bronx also ran local.

On January 5, limited service was partially restored on the 1 and 3 routes (1 trains running express in the northbound direction from 96th Street to 137th Street–City College), although service was not restored between 96th Street and Times Square. Limited southbound 2 service was also restored, while northbound 2 service continued to run via the IRT Lexington Avenue Line. On January 6, Governor Kathy Hochul announced that the MTA would restore full service overnight that same day to the early morning of January 7, and service was fully restored at 4:45 a.m. the next morning.

== Investigation ==
As of December 2025, the NTSB investigation into the incident is ongoing. In a January 25, 2024 release, the NTSB stated that its investigation would focus on four factors: "NYCT’s operating procedures when moving bad order cars, radio communication procedures, mechanical procedures when placing a revenue train in bad order status, and the lack of federal requirements for railcar event recorders on FTA regulated properties."

== See also ==
- 1905 Ninth Avenue derailment
- 1918 Malbone Street wreck
- 1928 Times Square derailment
- 1991 Union Square derailment
- 1995 Williamsburg Bridge subway collision
