= 72nd Street station (IRT Broadway–Seventh Avenue Line) =

New York City Subway station in Manhattan

72 Street
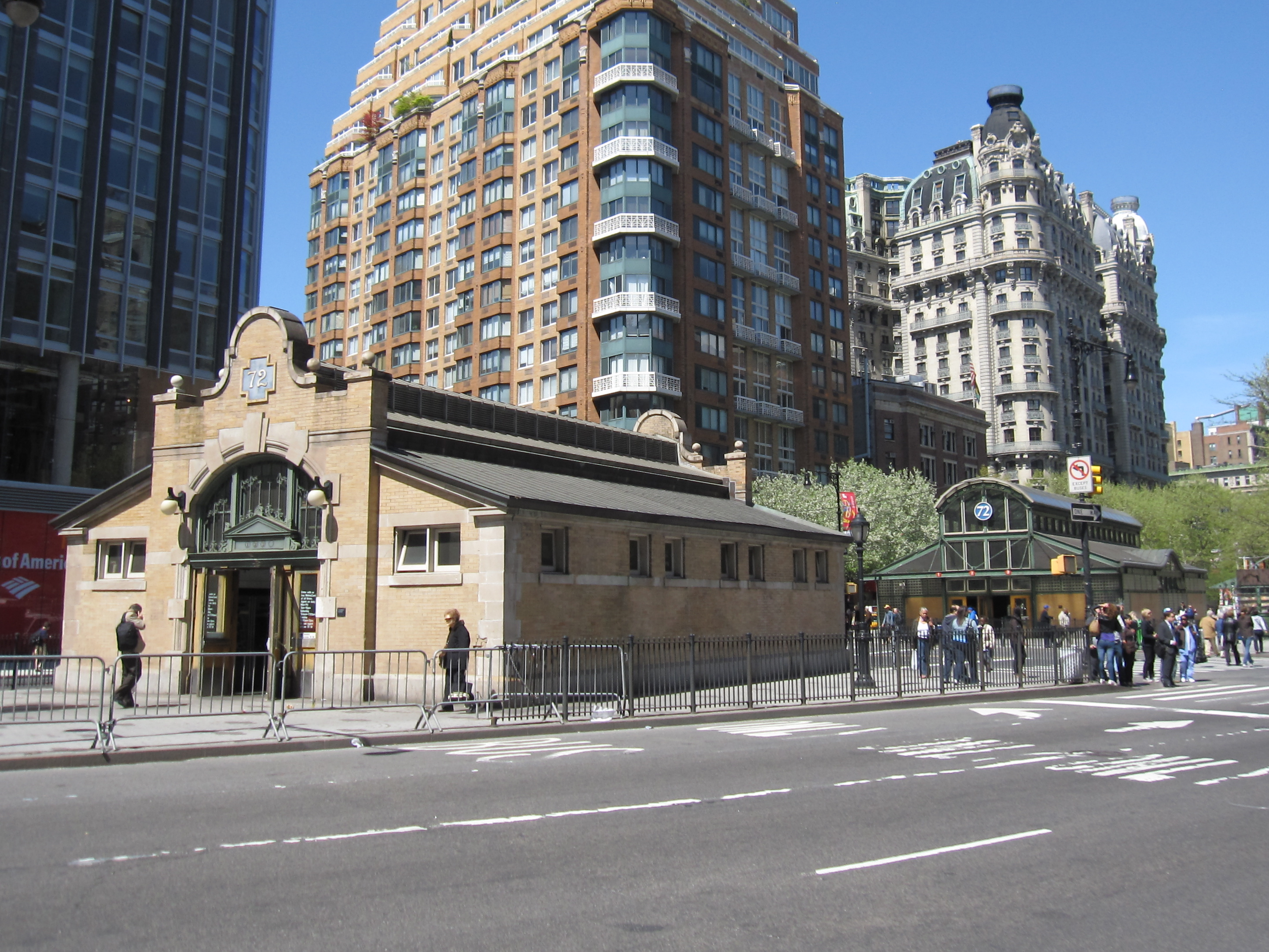
- Original control house (left) and newer control house, located on opposite sides of 72nd Street

Station statistics
- Address: area of West 72nd Street, Broadway & Amsterdam Avenue; New York, New York
- Borough: Manhattan
- Locale: Upper West Side
- Coordinates: 40°46′44.4″N 73°58′54.7″W
- Division: A (IRT)
- Line: IRT Broadway–Seventh Avenue Line
- Services: 1 (all times); 2 (all times); 3 (all times)
- Transit: NYCT Bus: M5, M7, M11, M57, M72, M104; MTA Bus: BxM2
- Structure: Underground
- Platforms: 2 island platforms cross-platform interchange
- Tracks: 4

Other information
- Opened: October 27, 1904; 121 years ago
- Accessible: Yes

Traffic
- 2025: 10,091,296 ▲3.7%
- Rank: 22 out of 423
Services
Preceding station	New York City Subway	Following station
96th Street 2 3 via 135th Street	Express	Times Square–42nd Street 2 3 via Franklin Avenue–Medgar Evers College
79th Street 1 2 toward Van Cortlandt Park–242nd Street	Local	66th Street–Lincoln Center 1 2 toward South Ferry
Location
Location within New York City Subway
Location within New York City
Location within New York
Track layout
Street map
Station service legend
Symbol	Description
Stops all times except late nights	Stops all times except late nights
Stops all times	Stops all times
Stops late nights only	Stops late nights only
- Control House on 72nd Street
- U.S. National Register of Historic Places
- New York City Landmark
- MPS: Interborough Rapid Transit Subway Control Houses TR
- NRHP reference No.: 80002684
- NYCL No.: 1021

Significant dates
- Added to NRHP: May 6, 1980
- Designated NYCL: January 9, 1979
- 72nd Street Subway Station (IRT)
- U.S. National Register of Historic Places
- New York City Landmark
- MPS: New York City Subway System MPS
- NRHP reference No.: 04001017
- NYCL No.: 1096

Significant dates
- Added to NRHP: September 17, 2004
- Designated NYCL: October 23, 1979

The 72nd Street station is an express station on the IRT Broadway–Seventh Avenue Line of the New York City Subway, located at the intersection of Broadway, 72nd Street, and Amsterdam Avenue on the Upper West Side of Manhattan. It is served by the 1, 2, and 3 trains at all times.

The 72nd Street station was constructed for the Interborough Rapid Transit Company (IRT) as part of the city's first subway line, which was approved in 1900. Construction of the line segment that includes the 72nd Street station began on August 22 of the same year. The station opened on October 27, 1904, as one of the original 28 stations of the New York City Subway. The 72nd Street station's platforms were lengthened in 1960 as part of an improvement project along the Broadway–Seventh Avenue Line. The station's only exit was originally through a head house in the median of Broadway south of 72nd Street. In 2002, the station was renovated and a second head house was built north of 72nd Street, within an expansion of Verdi Square.

The 72nd Street station contains two island platforms and four tracks. The outer tracks are used by local trains, while the inner two tracks are used by express trains. The station's original head house and part of its interior are New York City designated landmarks and are listed on the National Register of Historic Places. The northern head house contains elevators, which make the station compliant with the Americans with Disabilities Act of 1990.

== History ==
=== Construction and opening ===
Planning for a subway line in New York City dates to 1864, but development of what became the city's first subway line did not start until 1894, when the New York State Legislature passed the Rapid Transit Act. The subway plans were drawn up by a team of engineers led by William Barclay Parsons, the Rapid Transit Commission's chief engineer. It called for a subway line from New York City Hall in lower Manhattan to the Upper West Side, where two branches would lead north into the Bronx. A plan was formally adopted in 1897, and all legal conflicts over the route alignment were resolved near the end of 1899.

The Rapid Transit Construction Company, organized by John B. McDonald and funded by August Belmont Jr., signed the initial Contract 1 with the Rapid Transit Commission in February 1900, under which it would construct the subway and maintain a 50-year operating lease from the opening of the line. In 1901, the firm of Heins & LaFarge was hired to design the underground stations. Belmont incorporated the Interborough Rapid Transit Company (IRT) in April 1902 to operate the subway.

The 72nd Street station was constructed as part of the IRT's West Side Line (now the Broadway–Seventh Avenue Line) from 60th Street to 82nd Street, for which work had begun on August 22, 1900. Work for that section had been awarded to William Bradley. By late 1903, the subway was nearly complete, but the IRT Powerhouse and the system's electrical substations were still under construction, delaying the system's opening. As late as October 26, 1904, the day before the subway was scheduled to open, the walls and ceilings were incomplete. The 72nd Street station opened on October 27, 1904, as one of the original 28 stations of the New York City Subway from City Hall to 145th Street on the West Side Branch. The opening of the first subway line, and particularly the 72nd Street station, helped contribute to the development of the Upper West Side.

=== 1910s to 1930s ===
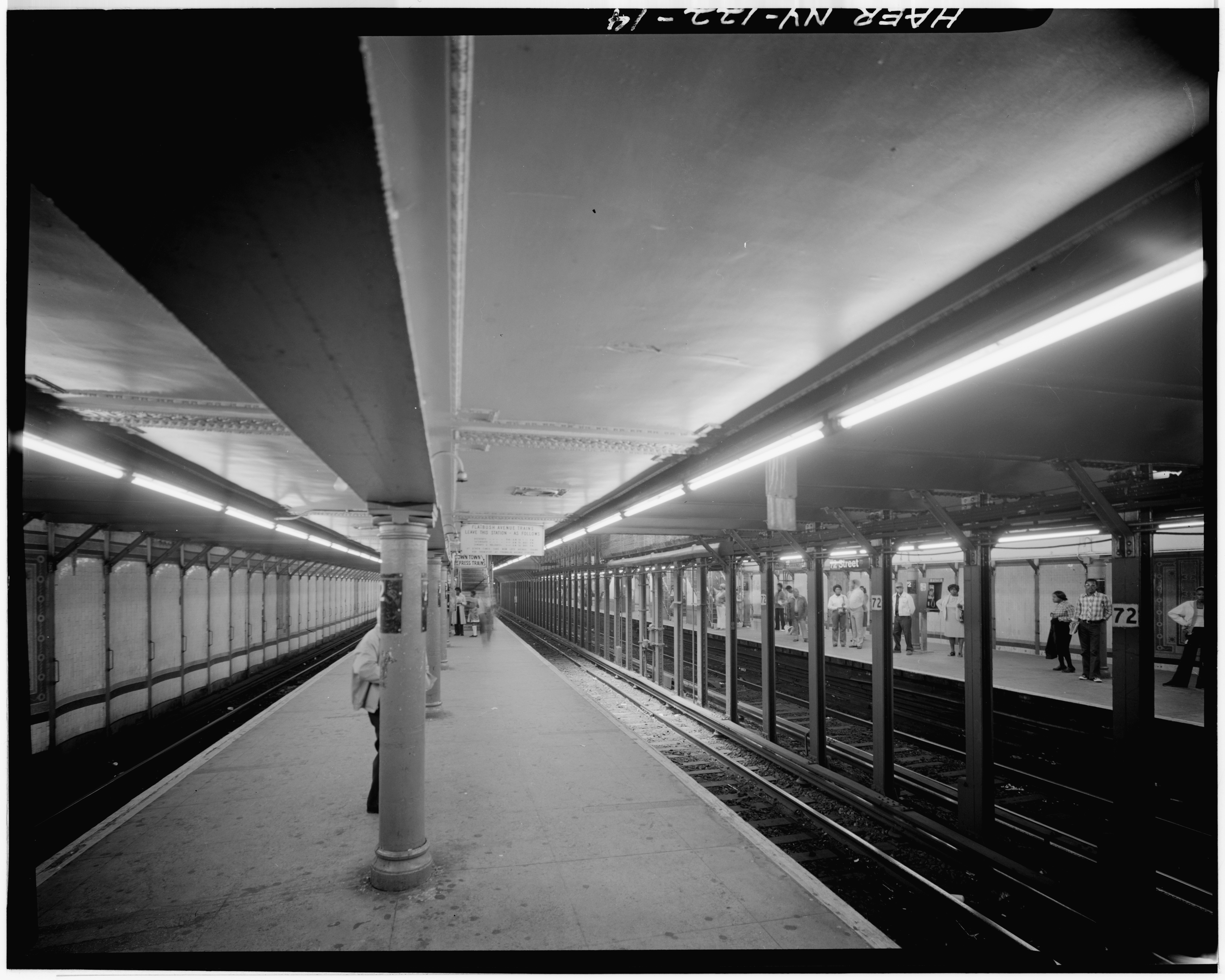
Older view of the station

After the first subway line was completed in 1908, the station was served by local and express trains along both the West Side (now the Broadway–Seventh Avenue Line to Van Cortlandt Park–242nd Street) and East Side (now the Lenox Avenue Line). West Side local trains had their southern terminus at City Hall during rush hours and South Ferry at other times, and had their northern terminus at 242nd Street. East Side local trains ran from City Hall to Lenox Avenue (145th Street). Express trains had their southern terminus at South Ferry or Atlantic Avenue and had their northern terminus at 242nd Street, Lenox Avenue (145th Street), or West Farms (180th Street). Express trains to 145th Street were later eliminated, and West Farms express trains and rush-hour Broadway express trains operated through to Brooklyn. (Note: The next local and express stations north, and the next local station south, are the same as on the present Broadway–Seventh Avenue Line. However, the next express station south was Grand Central.)

To address overcrowding, in 1909, the New York Public Service Commission proposed lengthening the platforms at stations along the original IRT subway. As part of a modification to the IRT's construction contracts made on January 18, 1910, the company was to lengthen station platforms to accommodate ten-car express and six-car local trains. In addition to $1.5 million (equivalent to $51.8 million in 2025) spent on platform lengthening, $500,000 (equivalent to $17.3 million in 2025) was spent on building additional entrances and exits. It was anticipated that these improvements would increase capacity by 25 percent. At the 72nd Street station, the northbound platform was extended 80 feet (24 m) south and 25 feet (7.6 m) north, while the southbound platform was extended 25 feet (7.6 m) south and 100 feet (30 m) north. A new crossover and signal tower were also built in conjunction with these extensions. Work progressed on the platform extensions at 72nd Street during 1910 and 1911. Six-car local trains began operating in October 1910. On January 23, 1911, ten-car express trains began running on the Lenox Avenue Line, and the next day, ten-car express trains were inaugurated on the West Side Line. The Broadway–Seventh Avenue Line opened south of Times Square–42nd Street in 1918, and the original line was divided into an H-shaped system. The original subway north of Times Square thus became part of the Broadway–Seventh Avenue Line. Local trains (Broadway and Lenox Avenue) were sent to South Ferry, while express trains (Broadway and West Farms) used the new Clark Street Tunnel to Brooklyn.

The original head house had two stairways to each platform, although a third stairway was added to the northbound platform at some point before 1924. In that year, it was proposed to build a third stairway to the southbound platform, and an exit-only staircase from the northbound platform to the traffic island just south of the head house; however, the Transit Bureau advised against this move as it would aggravate overcrowding. In 1930, there was funding allocated to remove the station head house, and replace it with an underpass and sidewalk entrances. In Fiscal Year 1937, space was cut out under parts of two staircases on the southbound platform to increase space for riders on the express side of the platform. Funding was again allocated to remove the station house in 1945.

=== 1940s to 1960s ===
The city government took over the IRT's operations on June 12, 1940. The IRT routes were given numbered designations in 1948 with the introduction of "R-type" rolling stock, which contained rollsigns with numbered designations for each service. The Broadway route to 242nd Street became known as the 1, the White Plains Road (formerly West Farms) route as the 2, and the Lenox Avenue route as the 3.

During the early 1950s, the New York City Transit Authority (NYCTA; now an agency of the Metropolitan Transportation Authority, or MTA) considered converting the 59th Street–Columbus Circle station, a major transfer point to the IND Eighth Avenue Line, from a local stop to an express stop. This would serve the anticipated rise of ridership at the stop resulting from the under-construction New York Coliseum and the expected redevelopment of the area. In conjunction with that project, the NYCTA considered converting the 72nd Street station to a local station by walling off the express tracks from the platforms. While the work was never completed, the firm Edwards, Kelcey and Beck was hired as Consulting Engineers in 1955 for the construction of the express station.

The original IRT stations north of Times Square could barely fit local trains of five or six cars depending on the configuration of the trains. Stations on the line from Times Square to 96th Street, including this station but excluding the 91st Street station, had their platforms extended in the 1950s to 525 feet (160 m) to accommodate ten-car trains as part of a $100 million rebuilding program (equivalent to $1,146.3 million in 2025). The platforms at 72nd Street were extended in 1960, and the track layout was changed accordingly. Once the project was completed, all 1 trains became local and all 2 and 3 trains became express, and eight-car local trains began operation. Increased and lengthened service was implemented during peak hours on the 1 train on February 6, 1959. Due to the lengthening of the platforms at 86th Street and 96th Street, the intermediate 91st Street station was closed on February 2, 1959, because it was too close to the other two stations. In 1959, work was underway to install fluorescent lighting in the station.

=== 1970s and 1980s ===
In 1973, funding was allocated to study removing the headhouse and replacing it with sidewalk entrances. The project would have created entrances on either sidewalk between 71st and 72nd Streets, connected to the platforms by a passageway under the tracks. The city government allocated a $1.35 million grant for the project, which was withdrawn in February 1976. Afterward, U.S. representative Bella S. Abzug continued to advocate for the station's renovation. By 1979, there were plans to build a new station entrance and convert the existing headhouse into a newsstand.

In the 1980s, the developers Abe Hirschfeld and Carlos Varsavsky pledged to spend $30 million renovating the 72nd Street station, in exchange for receiving the city government's approval for the nearby Lincoln West development. When the developer Donald Trump took over the Lincoln West site in 1984, he said he would consider renovating the station but did not commit to the renovation. In 1987, the founders of Ben & Jerry's proposed to spend $200,000 to $250,000 a year to maintain, clean, paint the station, install mosaics, and pipe in music into the station. Though their proposal was supported by the MTA, the Transport Workers Union was opposed to the proposal as Ben & Jerry's wanted to hire non-union labor for the project. The proposal had stalled by the end of 1987. Ultimately, the contract expired at the end of March 1988. Rather than adopting the 72nd Street station for maintenance, Ben & Jerry's chose to sponsor a theater of geese.

From September 2 to 5, 1989, the station was closed so the station house could be reconfigured to reduce crowding at its northern end. The southern end of the station house was converted to an entrance, and two smaller token booths were installed, replacing the large token booth that blocked passenger flow through the middle of the station house. Turnstiles were moved to create separate fare control areas for northbound and southbound trains, eliminating free transfers between directions. In addition, the newsstand at the station house's northeastern corner was moved to the southwestern corner. The lack of a free transfer between northbound and southbound trains persisted through the early 2000s.

=== Renovation and 21st century ===
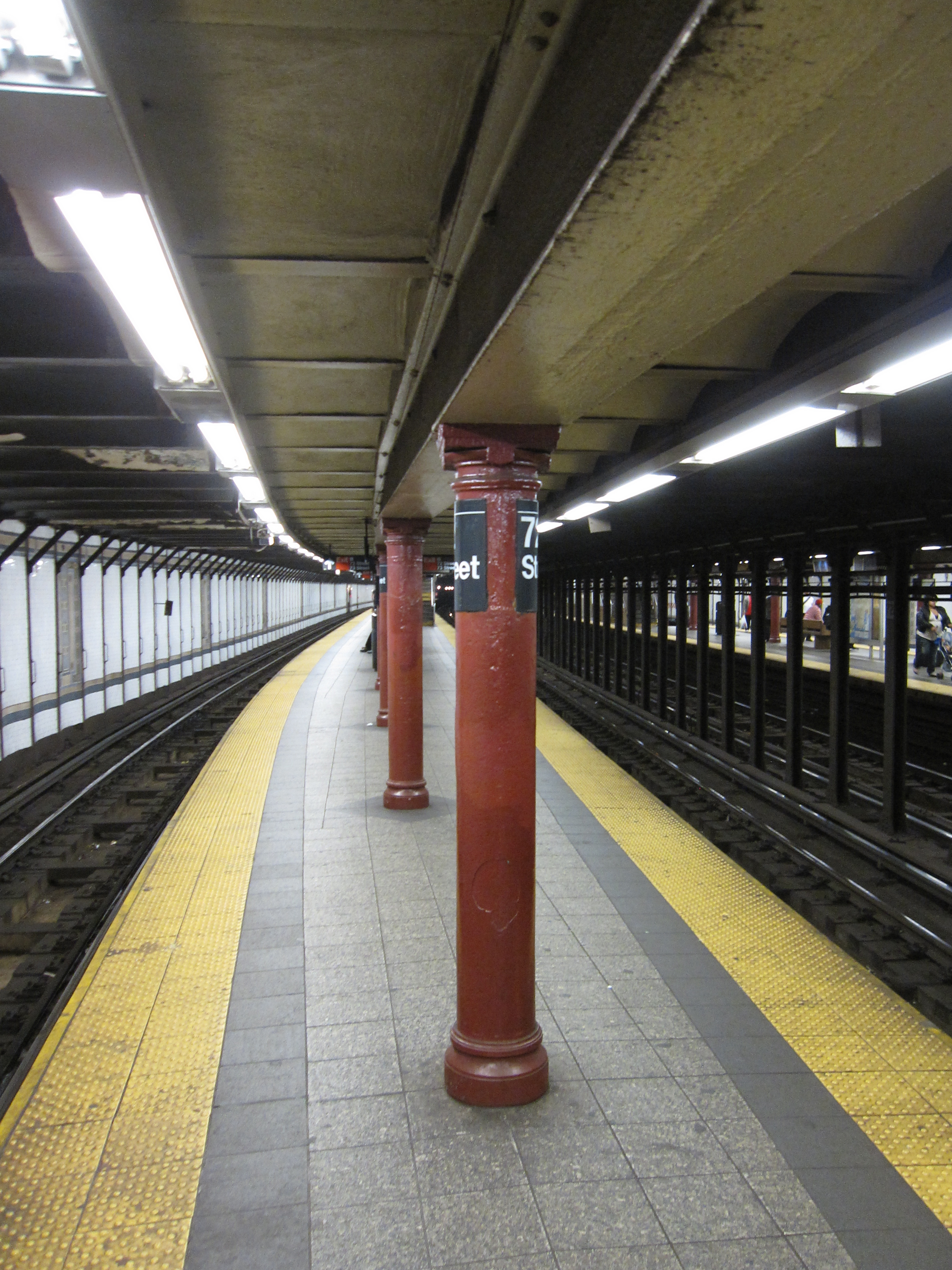
A view of the narrow end of one of the platforms

By the late 20th century, the original configuration of the station was inadequate. Its only entrance was on the traffic island between Broadway, Amsterdam Avenue, and 71st and 72nd Streets. Furthermore, the platforms and stairways were unusually narrow; the platforms were 15.5 feet (4.7 m) wide at their widest point, and the staircases were 4 feet (1.2 m) wide. When Donald Trump developed his Riverside South complex two blocks to the west in the 1990s, some locals opposed Trump's development, saying it would increase crowding at the 72nd Street station. Following local residents' objections that the construction of Riverside South would worsen overcrowding at the station, Trump agreed to give $5 million toward the station's renovation. In October 1992, he offered to provide another $1 million for the station's expansion in exchange for the New York City Planning Commission's approval of his project.

MTA officials announced in 1994 that they would spend $40 million to widen the platform. To help fund the renovation, U.S. representative Jerry Nadler requested a $9.5 million grant from the federal government in 1994. MTA officials subsequently rejected the renovation as being infeasible, saying the expense of digging through the bedrock to widen the platforms would have increased the project's total cost to $200 million. Neighborhood groups protested the MTA's decision. By February 1996, MTA officials were planning to award a $2 million design contract and a $55 million construction contract for the station renovation. Dattner Architects and Gruzen Samton completed the design the same year.

In 1998, New York City Transit's vice president for capital improvements, Mysore Nagaraja, said that a renovation of the 72nd Street station would commence after more important projects were completed. The project was budgeted at $63 million, and state assemblyman Scott Stringer successfully campaigned to have money allocated to the 72nd Street station's renovation. The platforms would also be lengthened and a second entrance with elevators would be built. Local residents objected that the renovations would not address the platforms' narrow width. In February 1999, the MTA Board adopted a resolution allowing the MTA to use a request for proposals process for the project.

Work on the project was initially slated to begin in March 2000, with an expected completion date of Summer 2003. However, work on the project, which was to cost $53 million (equivalent to $99.1 million in 2025), commenced in June 2000. As part of the project, a secondary station house entrance with elevators was built north of 72nd Street. Each platform was lengthened by 50 feet (15 m), although the platforms largely remained the same width. The work also involved permanently closing the northbound roadway of Broadway from 72nd to 73rd Streets, with northbound Broadway traffic being diverted onto Amsterdam Avenue. Constructing the station house required taking a portion of Verdi Square, which required the replacement of the lost park space. The original plan for the new station house would have included the use of vault lighting. However, in order to cut costs and deal with concerns over their maintenance, vault lighting was removed from the project. The renovation was completed on October 29, 2002, providing a new, larger station house on the traffic island between 72nd and 73rd Streets and slightly wider platforms at the north end of the station. The closeout of the project was done fourteen months late due to a setback in the installation of street lighting and acceptance by the New York City Department of Transportation.

In October 2026, the MTA announced plans to install taller fare gates with glass panels at 20 additional stations, including the 72nd Street station, following a successful pilot program at earlier stations.

=== Landmark designations ===
The New York City Landmarks Preservation Commission (LPC) designated the station house on the traffic island between 71st and 72nd Streets as a city landmark in January 1979. The LPC chairman at the time said: "The subway kiosk is one of those irreplaceable amenities that do more than serve a useful function." In October 1979, the LPC designated the space within the boundaries of the original station, excluding expansions made after 1904, as a city landmark. The station was designated along with eleven others on the original IRT. The original station house was listed on the National Register of Historic Places (NRHP) in 1980, and the original interiors were listed on the NRHP in 2004.

== Station layout ==
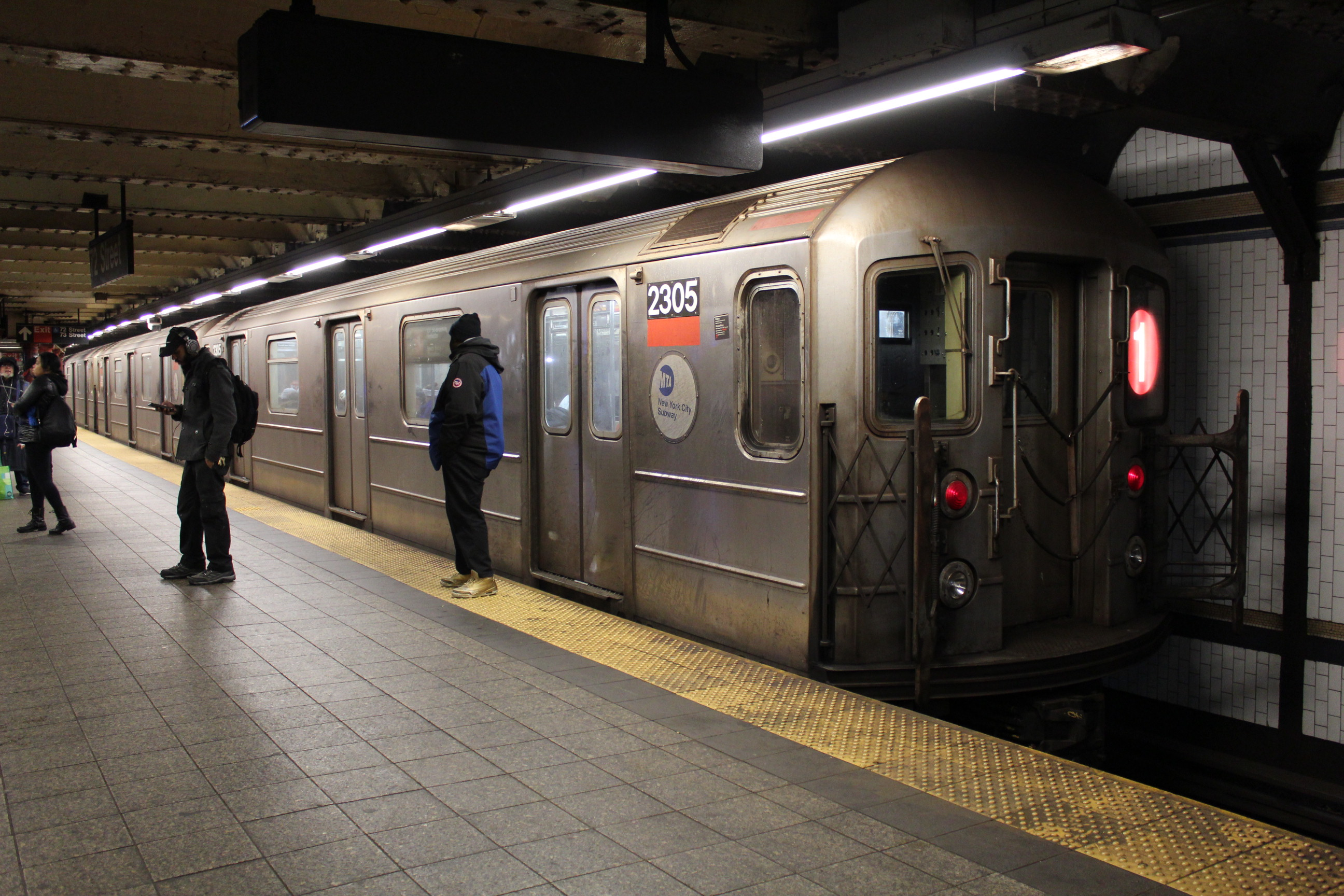
An uptown 1 train in the station

72nd Street contains four tracks and two island platforms that allow for cross-platform interchanges between local and express trains heading in the same direction. Express trains run on the innermost two tracks, while local trains run on the outer pair. The local tracks are used by the 1 train at all times and by the 2 train during the night; the express tracks are used by the 2 train during daytime hours and by the 3 train at all times. The next stop to the north is 79th Street for local trains and 96th Street for express trains. The next stop to the south is 66th Street–Lincoln Center for local trains and Times Square–42nd Street for express trains. The 72nd Street station is fully wheelchair-accessible, with elevators connecting the street and platforms.

The platforms were originally 350 feet (110 m) long, as at other express stations, and 15.5 feet (4.7 m) wide. The station platforms were later lengthened, and by 1941 the southbound platform was 482 feet (147 m) long, with the center 340 feet (100 m) being 15.5 feet (4.7 m) wide. The platforms narrowed for 70 feet (21 m) on either side. As a result of the 1958–1959 platform extension, both platforms became 520 feet (160 m) long. From the southbound platform, two stairs go to the southern station house, while two stairs and one elevator lead to the northern station house. From the northbound platform, three stairs lead to the southern station house, while two stairs and one elevator lead to the northern station house. The station is only 14 feet (4.3 m) below street level.

=== Design ===
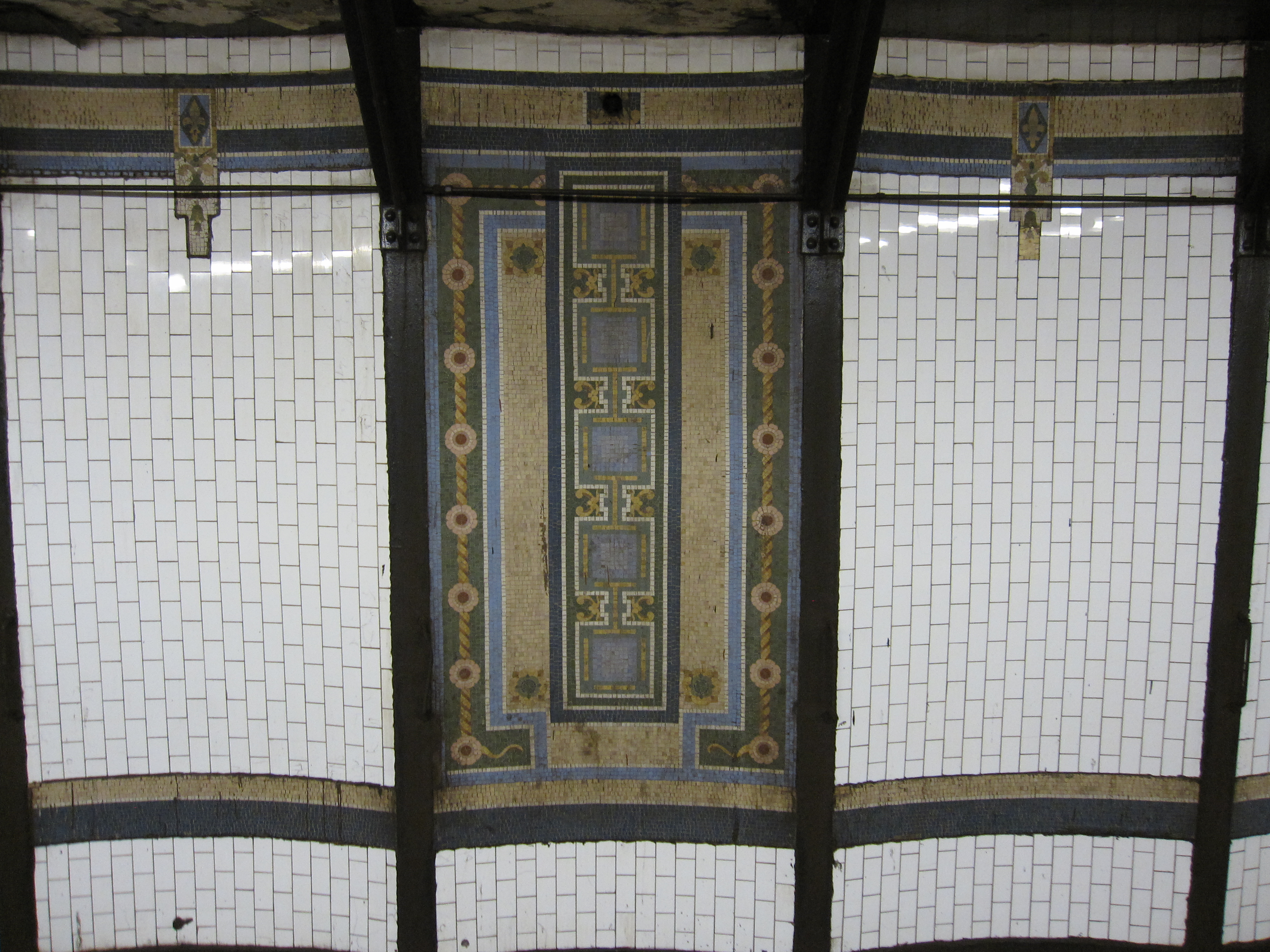
Mosaic tapestries on the trackside walls

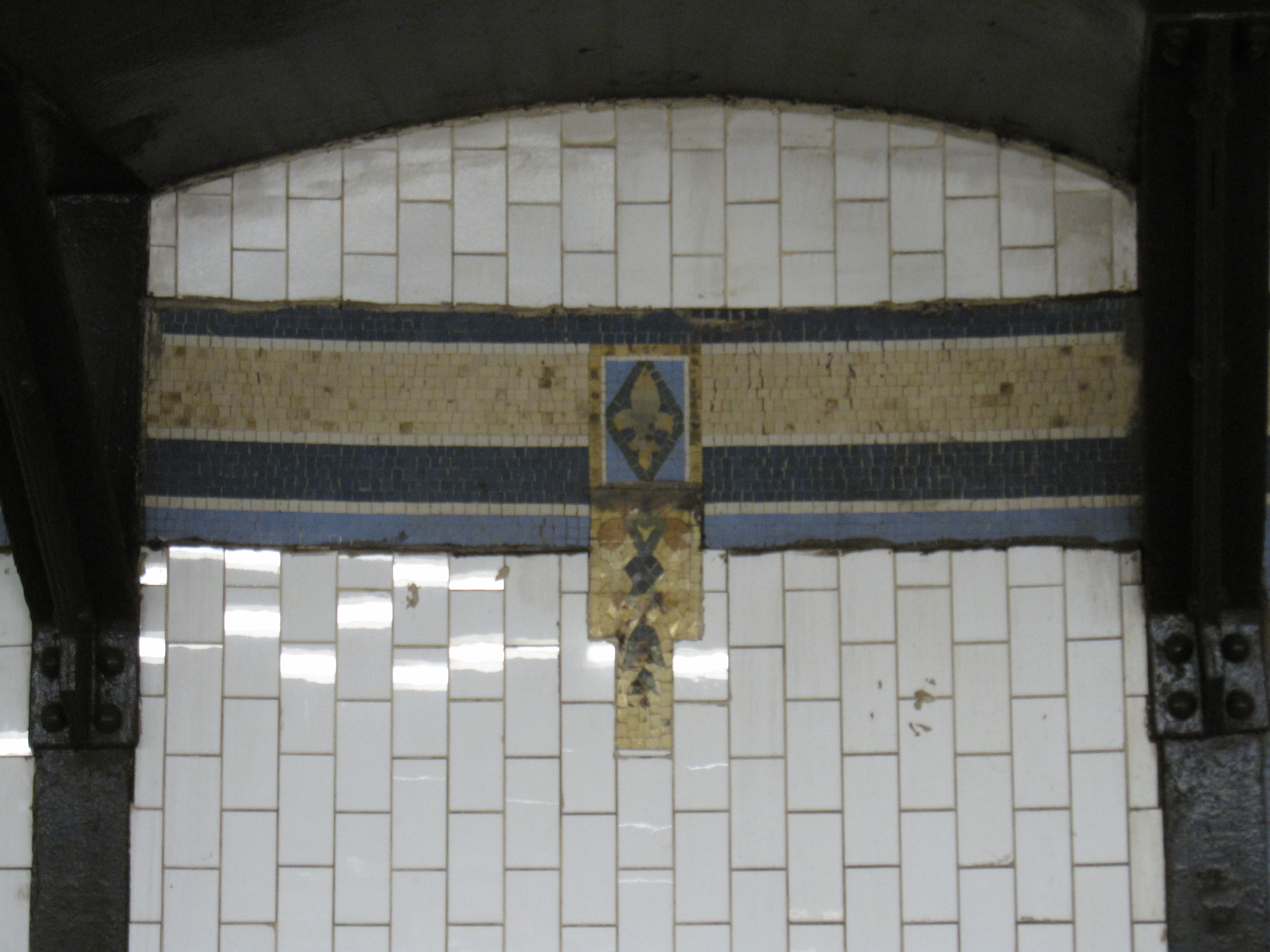
Detail of the wall decoration with a fleur-de-lis

As with other stations built as part of the original IRT, the station was constructed using a cut-and-cover method. The tunnel is covered by a U-shaped trough that contains utility pipes and wires. This trough contains a foundation of concrete no less than 4 inches (100 mm) thick. Each platform consists of 3-inch-thick (7.6 cm) concrete slabs, beneath which are drainage basins. The original platforms contain circular, cast-iron Doric-style columns spaced every 15 feet (4.6 m), while the platform extensions contain I-beam columns. Additional columns between the tracks, spaced every 5 feet (1.5 m), support the jack-arched concrete station roofs. There is a 1-inch (25 mm) gap between the trough wall and the platform walls, which are made of 4-inch (100 mm)-thick brick covered over by a tiled finish.

In the 72nd Street station, decorative elements are limited largely to the walls adjacent to the tracks, which are made of white glass tiles. The walls are divided by steel support columns every 5 feet (1.5 m); the panels between each set of columns are curved slightly away from the tracks. At 50-foot (15 m) intervals along the station walls, there are 5-by-8-foot (1.5 by 2.4 m) mosaic panels with blue, buff, and cream tiles in tapestry designs. Atop each wall is a frieze with blue and buff mosaic tiles, with scrolled motifs protruding below the frieze band. The walls near the tracks do not have any identifying motifs with the station's name, as all station identification signs are on the platforms. There are some doorways along the trackside walls. At the platform staircases, the walls beneath the stairwell have white tile above brick wainscoting, while there are metal fences beside the stairwell. The mosaic tiles at all original IRT stations were manufactured by the American Encaustic Tile Company, which subcontracted the installations at each station. The decorative work was performed by tile contractor John H. Parry.

=== Exits ===
The entrances and exits are in two station houses, both on traffic islands between Broadway and Amsterdam Avenue. The original station house is south of 72nd Street, while the newer one is in Verdi Square north of 72nd Street. The preexisting median of Broadway made it possible for the IRT to provide an entrance to the station through a station house, with the platforms directly underneath.

==== Southern station house ====
Old station house

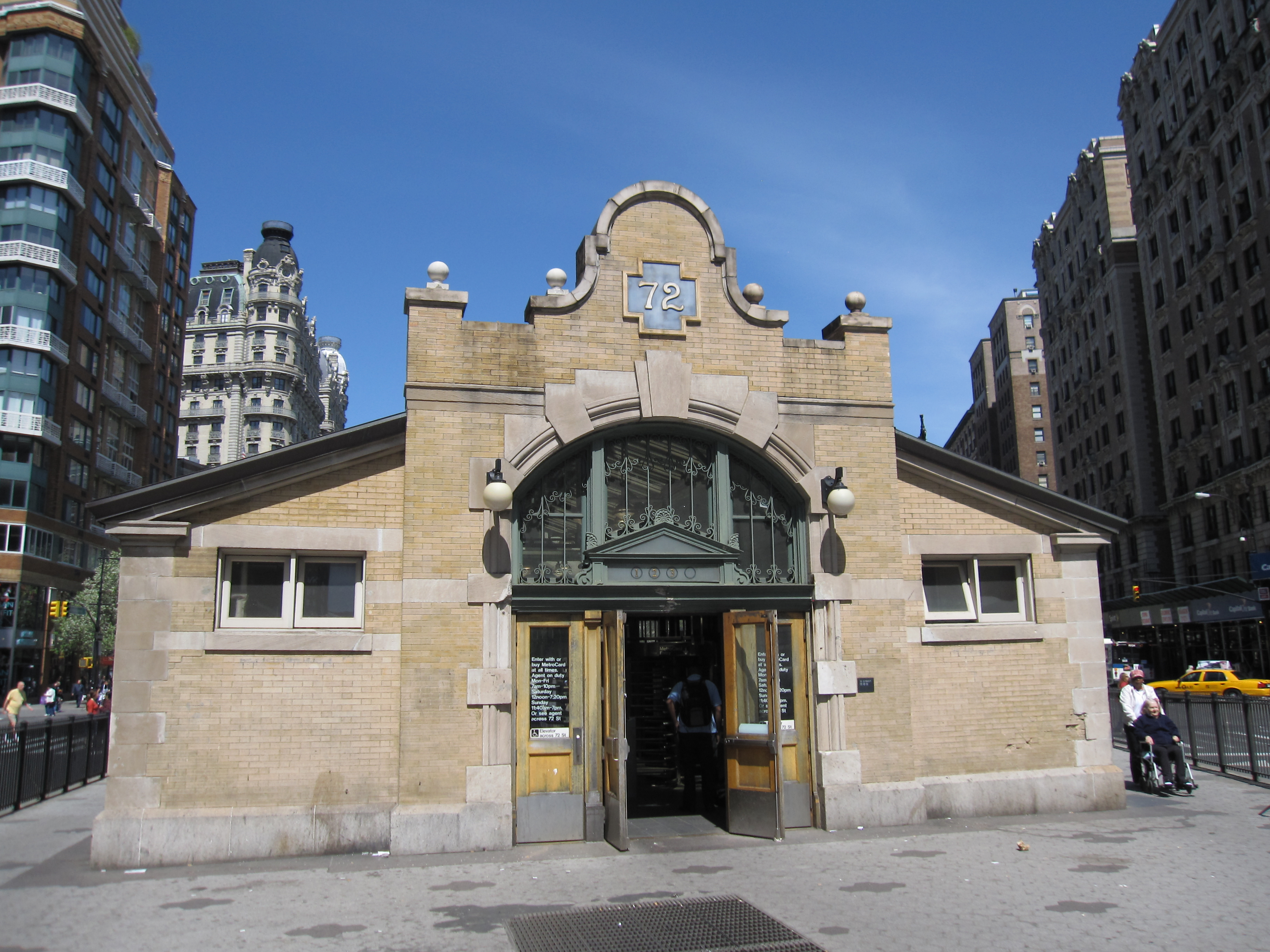
Exterior

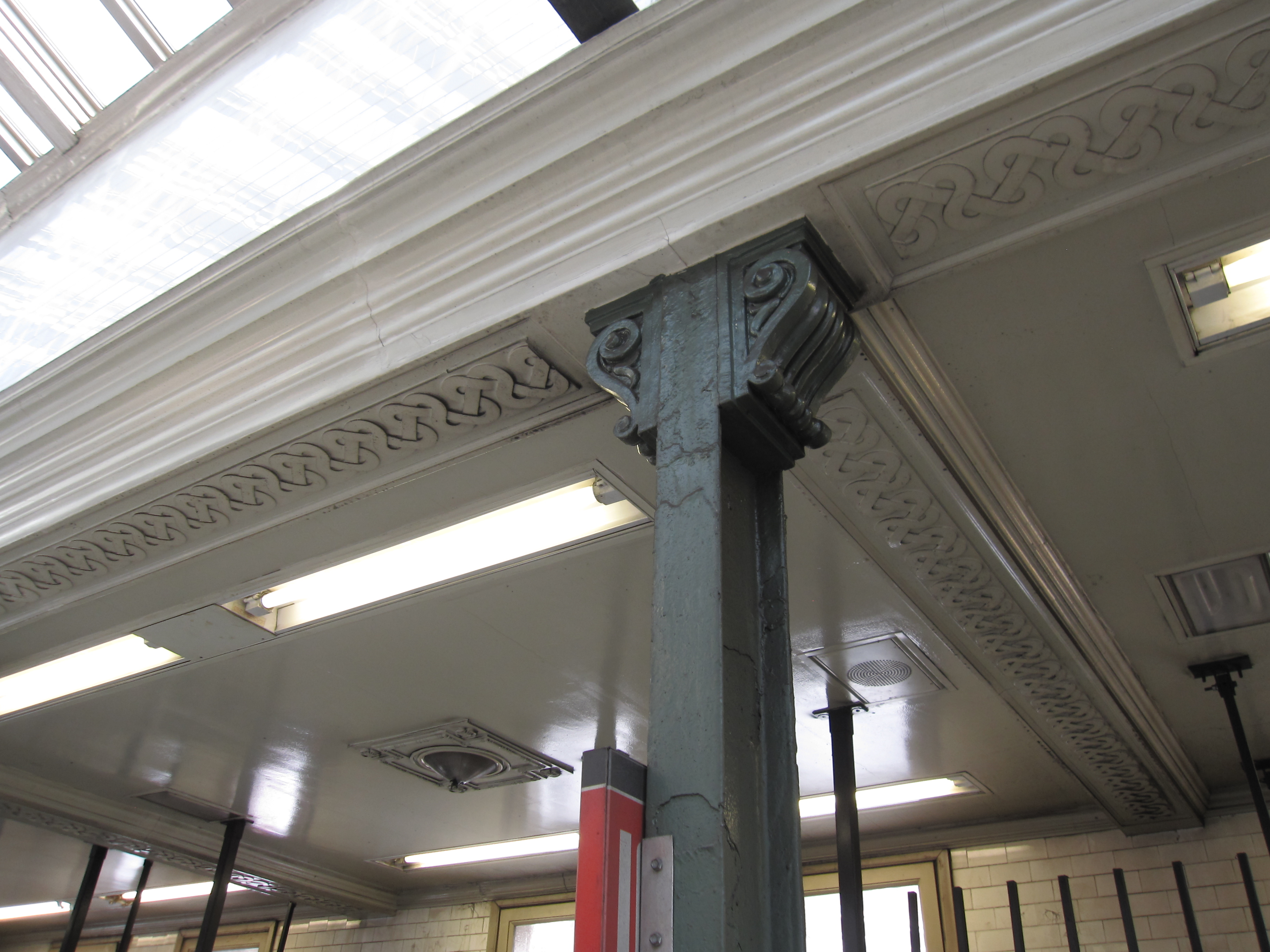
Detail of the decorated ceiling

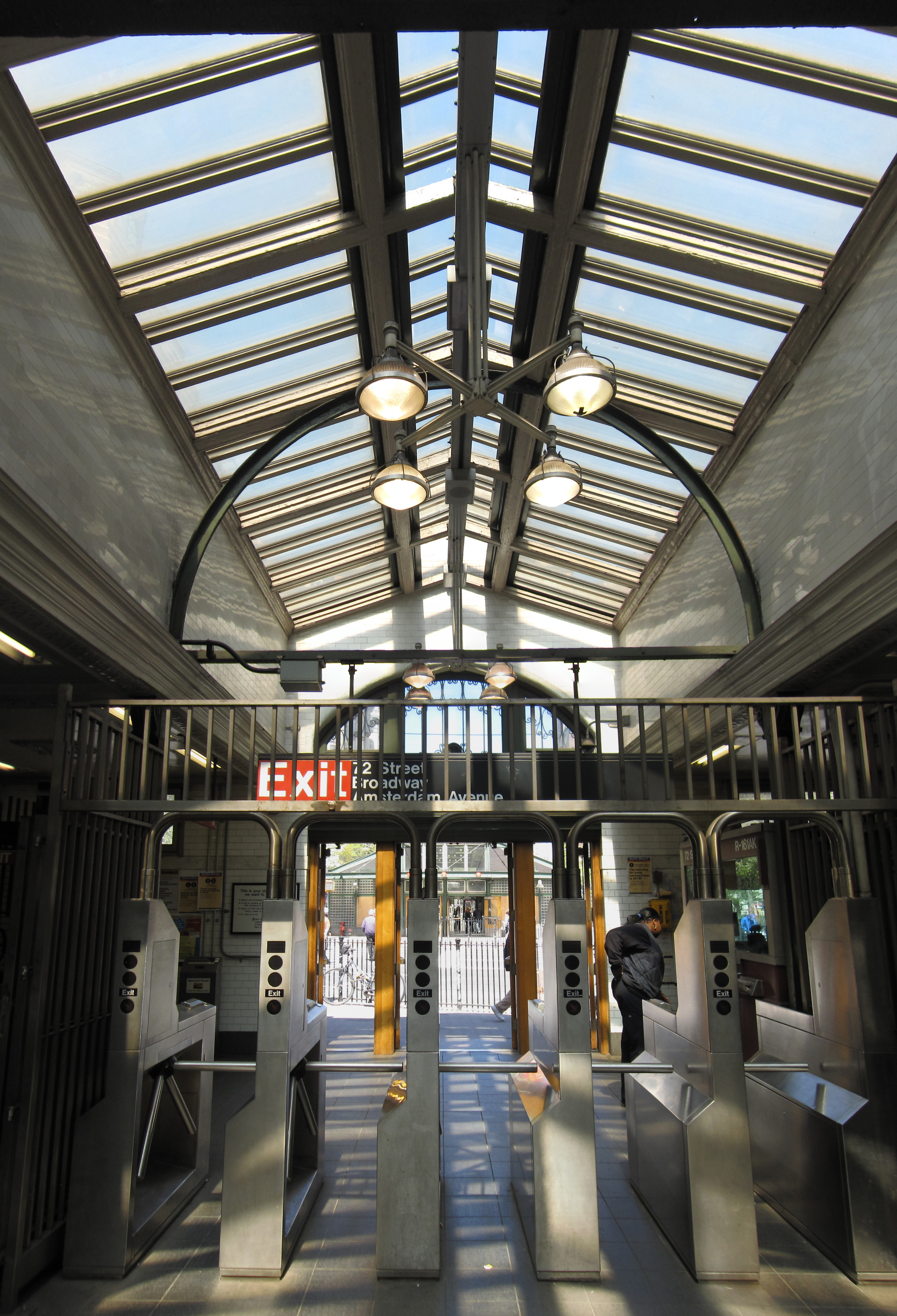
Interior

The original station house is one of a few surviving examples designed by Heins & LaFarge, which designed elements of many of the original IRT subway stations. It is designed in the Flemish Renaissance style. The station house was one of several on the original IRT; similar station houses were built at Atlantic Avenue, Bowling Green, Mott Avenue, 103rd Street, and 116th Street. The station house occupies an area of 50 by 37 feet (15 by 11 m) and is aligned parallel to Broadway to create a focal point on Sherman Square. This places the station house slightly askew from the Manhattan street grid, of which 72nd Street and Amsterdam Avenue are part.

The one-story station house contains exterior walls made of buff brick, with a water table made of granite blocks. A limestone string course runs atop the exterior wall. At the corners of the station house are limestone quoins, which support a copper-and-terracotta gable roof facing west and east. The ridge of the station house's roof is a skylight made of glass and metal. The doorways are centrally located on the north and south walls of the control house, topped by four terracotta finials and a rounded gable. There are terracotta crosses on each rounded gable with the number "72" embossed onto them. The south doorway contains four doors, above which is a pediment and an arched window made of glass and wrought iron. The north doorway is similar, but with five doors. Flanking the entrances are small windows.

Inside the station house are artful wrought iron pillars, dating back to the days of the original subway system, as well as decorated ceiling beams. The walls are made of white glass tiles. As originally configured, the station house had separate turnstile banks and token booths for each side, which were subsequently combined into a single fare-control area. The original station house has five staircases, two to the southbound platform and three to the northbound platform, although it was originally built with two stairs to each platform. On the north side, an unstaffed turnstile bank leads to 72nd Street; on the south side, three High Entry/Exit Turnstiles lead to 71st Street. Above the exit doorways are decorative transoms and pediments with wayfinding signs. The interior of the original station house also had a restroom.

When the station was completed, the station house's architecture was unpopular; an editorial in The New York Times derided it as "A miserable monstrosity as to architecture". The Times cited widespread complaints from neighborhood residents, including a member of the Colonial Club on Amsterdam Avenue and 72nd Street, who likened the structure's original dark-brown color to "a mud fence". The West End Association had adopted a resolution in December 1904, declaring the station house "not only an offense to the eye, but a very serious danger to life and limb", and recommending that it be demolished.

==== Northern station house ====
New station house

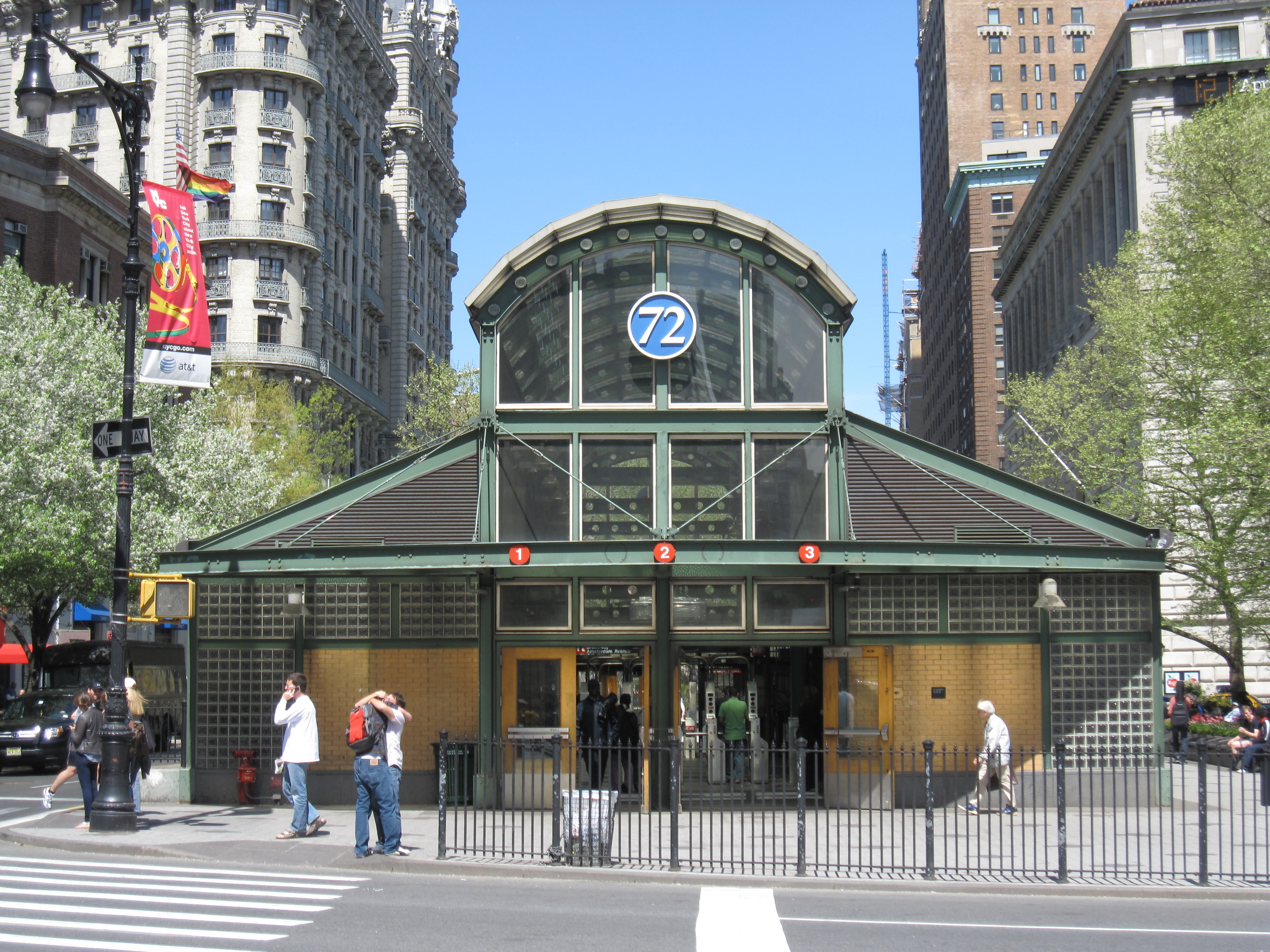
Exterior

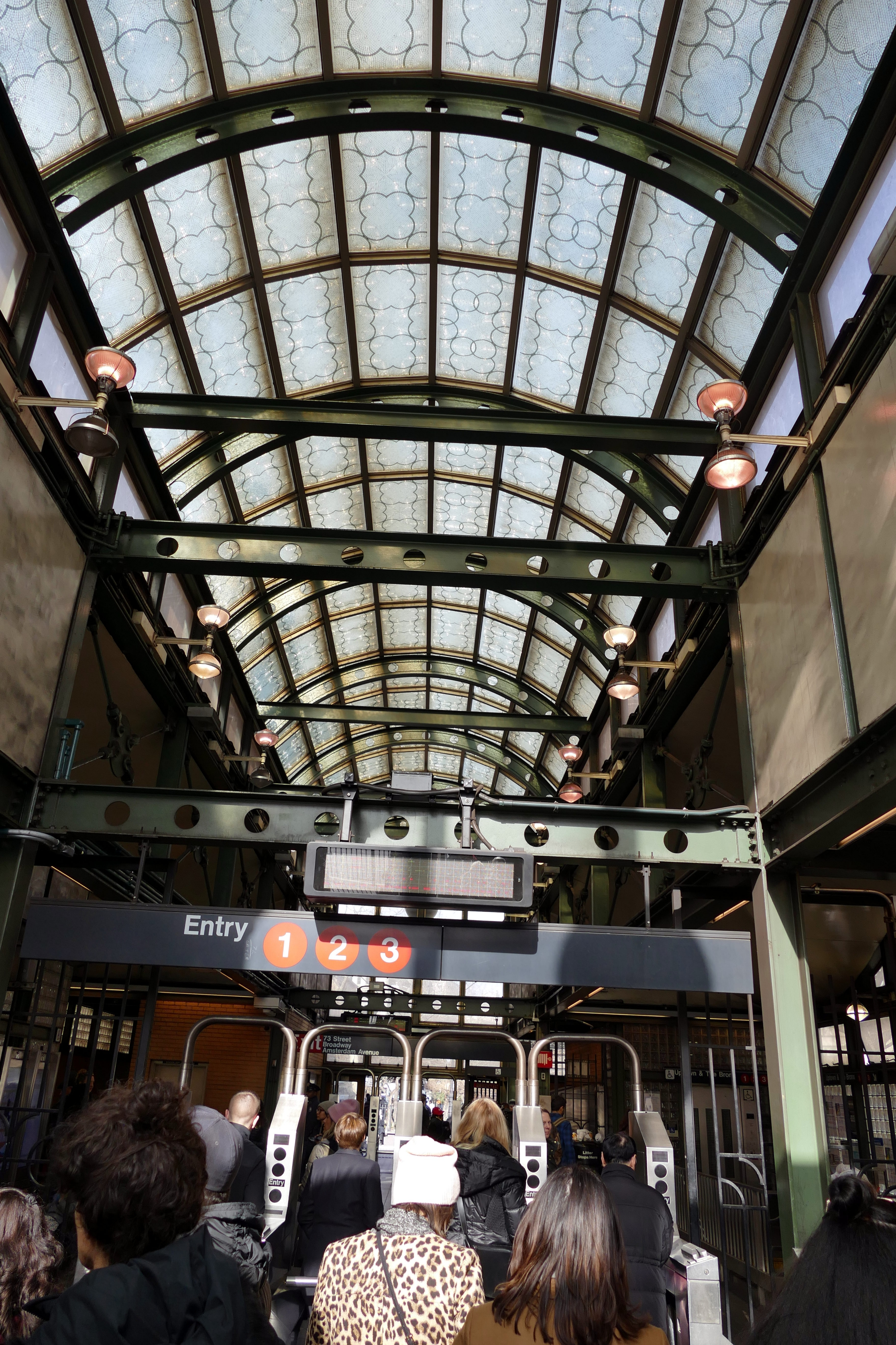
Interior

The northern station house was designed by Richard Dattner & Partners and Gruzen Samton. Its overall design was inspired by the Crystal Palace in London. The northern station house contains the station's elevators and a crossover between the northbound and southbound platforms. This station house has two staircases and one elevator from each platform going up to street level where turnstile banks lead to 72nd and 73rd Streets. Only the southern turnstile bank, which leads to 72nd Street, has a staffed token booth. The elevators from this station house make this station ADA-accessible. There are also employee areas in the northern station house.

The northern station house has an artwork, Laced Canopy by Robert Hickman, which consists of a mosaic pattern on the central skylight, made up of over 100 mosaic panels. The knots within the pattern make up the notation for an excerpt of Giuseppe Verdi's Rigoletto. The panels weigh over 161 pounds (73 kg) and stretch about 100 feet (30 m).
