= 96 =

96 or ninety-six may refer to:

- 96 (number), the natural number following 95 and preceding 97
- one of the years 96 BC, AD 96, 1996, 2096, etc.

== Places ==
- Ninety Six, South Carolina

== Film and television ==
- '96 (film), a 2018 Indian Tamil-language romantic drama film by C. Prem Kumar
- Number 96 (TV series), a 1972 Australian soap opera
- Number 96 (film), 1974 Australian film

== Music ==
- "96", a song by Japanese band Uverworld

== Sports ==
- Hannover 96, a German football club nicknamed "96"

== Science ==
- Atomic number 96: curium
- 96 Aegle, a main-belt asteroid

== Other uses ==
- Saab 96, a small family car

== See also ==
- 96th (disambiguation)
- List of highways numbered 96
