= 96th Street station (IRT Broadway–Seventh Avenue Line) =

New York City Subway station in Manhattan

96 Street
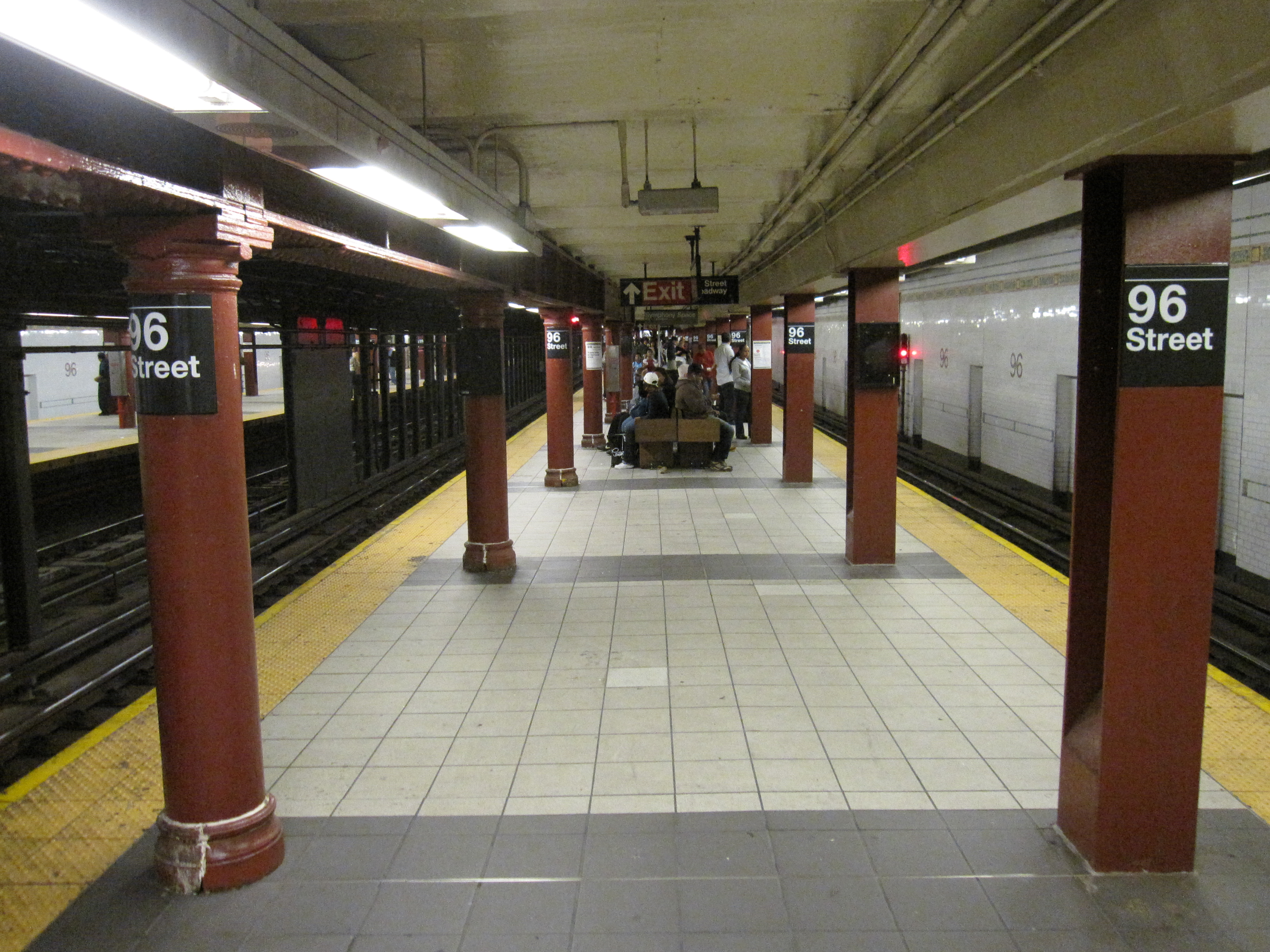
- The uptown island platform in October 2010

Station statistics
- Address: West 96th Street and Broadway; New York, New York
- Borough: Manhattan
- Locale: Upper West Side
- Coordinates: 40.7941°N 73.972°W
- Division: A (IRT)
- Line: IRT Broadway–Seventh Avenue Line
- Services: 1 (all times); 2 (all times); 3 (all times)
- Transit: NYCT Bus: M96, M104, M106; Columbia Transportation: Intercampus Shuttles
- Structure: Underground
- Platforms: 2 island platforms (in service) cross-platform interchange 2 side platforms (abandoned)
- Tracks: 4

Other information
- Opened: October 27, 1904; 122 years ago
- Accessible: Yes

Traffic
- 2025: 8,700,833 ▲5.7%
- Rank: 25 out of 423
Services
| Preceding station | New York City Subway | Following station |
|---|---|---|
| 110th Street–Malcolm X Plaza 2 3 via 135th Street | Express | 72nd Street 2 3 via Franklin Avenue–Medgar Evers College |
| 103rd Street 1 toward Van Cortlandt Park–242nd Street | Local | 86th Street 1 2 toward South Ferry |
Non-revenue services and lines
| Preceding station | New York City Subway | Following station |
|---|---|---|
| 157th Street Broadway–7th express | no service | 91st Street local; closed |
| 145th Street Broadway–7th express; one-way operation | no service | |
Location
Location within New York City Subway
Location within New York City
Location within New York
Track layout
Street map
Station service legend
| Symbol | Description |
| Stops all times except late nights | Stops all times except late nights |
| Stops all times | Stops all times |
| Stops late nights only | Stops late nights only |

The 96th Street station is an express station on the IRT Broadway–Seventh Avenue Line of the New York City Subway. Located at the intersection of 96th Street and Broadway on the Upper West Side of Manhattan, it is served by the 1, 2, and 3 trains at all times.

The 96th Street station was constructed for the Interborough Rapid Transit Company (IRT) as part of the city's first subway line, which was approved in 1900. Construction of the line segment that includes the 96th Street station began on August 22 of that year. The station opened on October 27, 1904, as one of the original 28 stations of the New York City Subway. The platforms were lengthened in 1960 as part of an improvement project along the Broadway–Seventh Avenue Line. A new head house and elevators were constructed between 2007 and 2010.

The 96th Street station contains two island platforms, two unused side platforms, and four tracks. The outer tracks are used by local trains and the inner tracks by express trains. The station contains two sets of exits: a head house at the northern end, in the median of Broadway at 96th Street, and staircases at Broadway and 94th Street. The head house contains elevators, which make the station compliant with the Americans with Disabilities Act of 1990.

== History ==
=== Construction and opening ===
Planning for a subway line in New York City dates to 1864, but development of what became the city's first subway line did not start until 1894, when the New York State Legislature passed the Rapid Transit Act. The subway plans were drawn up by a team of engineers led by William Barclay Parsons, the Rapid Transit Commission's chief engineer. It called for a subway line from New York City Hall in lower Manhattan to the Upper West Side, where two branches would lead north into the Bronx. A plan was formally adopted in 1897, and all legal conflicts over the route alignment were resolved near the end of 1899.

The Rapid Transit Construction Company, organized by John B. McDonald and funded by August Belmont Jr., signed the initial Contract 1 with the Rapid Transit Commission in February 1900, under which it would construct the subway and maintain a 50-year operating lease from the opening of the line. In 1901, the firm of Heins & LaFarge was hired to design the underground stations. Belmont incorporated the Interborough Rapid Transit Company (IRT) in April 1902 to operate the subway.

The 96th Street station was constructed as part of the IRT's West Side Line (now the Broadway–Seventh Avenue Line) from 82nd Street to 104th Street, on which work began on August 22, 1900. Work for that section had been awarded to William Bradley. By late 1903, the subway was nearly complete, but the IRT Powerhouse and the system's electrical substations were still under construction, delaying the system's opening. The 96th Street station opened on October 27, 1904, as one of the original 28 stations of the New York City Subway from City Hall to 145th Street on the West Side Branch.

=== Early 20th century ===
East Side local trains and West Side express trains crossed over at an at-grade junction north of 96th Street, creating heavy congestion during rush hours. In April 1907, the IRT submitted a report to the RTC, proposing to alleviate the congestion by building extra tracks. On June 27, 1907, a modification called the 96th Street Improvement was made to Contract 1 to add additional tracks at 96th Street in order to remove the at-grade junction north of the 96th Street station. Here, trains from Lenox Avenue and Broadway would switch to get to the express or local tracks and would delay service. The new tracks would have been constructed with the necessary fly-under tracks and switches. The estimated cost of the work was $850,000. Neighboring property owners objected to the plan since the work required tearing up the street above the tunnel. Accordingly, in December 1908, city officials announced they would introduce speed-control signals, making the 96th Street Improvement unnecessary. Some ramps had already been completed, so provisions were left to allow the work to be completed later. The signals were put into place at 96th Street on April 23, 1909. They allowed trains approaching a station to run more closely to the stopped train, eliminating the need to be separated by hundreds of feet.

When the station opened, the station served as the terminus of local trains; express trains ran as locals north to 145th Street. The first subway line was extended several times, reaching its full length in 1908, when the northernmost section to the Van Cortlandt Park–242nd Street station opened. The station was served by local and express trains along both the West Side (now the Broadway–Seventh Avenue Line to Van Cortlandt Park–242nd Street) and East Side (now the Lenox Avenue Line). West Side local trains had their southern terminus at City Hall during rush hours and South Ferry at other times, and had their northern terminus at 242nd Street. East Side local trains ran from City Hall to Lenox Avenue (145th Street). Express trains had their southern terminus at South Ferry or Atlantic Avenue and had their northern terminus at 242nd Street, Lenox Avenue (145th Street), or West Farms (180th Street). Express trains to 145th Street were later eliminated, and West Farms express trains and rush-hour Broadway express trains operated through to Brooklyn.

The platforms were originally 350 feet (110 m) long, as at other express stations, and 18 feet (5.5 m) wide. To address overcrowding, in 1909, the New York Public Service Commission proposed lengthening the platforms at stations along the original IRT subway. As part of a modification to the IRT's construction contracts made on January 18, 1910, the company was to lengthen station platforms to accommodate ten-car express and six-car local trains. In addition to $1.5 million (equivalent to $51.8 million in 2025) spent on platform lengthening, $500,000 (equivalent to $17.3 million in 2025) was spent on building additional entrances and exits. It was anticipated that these improvements would increase capacity by 25 percent. At the 96th Street station, the northbound island platform was extended 100 feet (30 m) south, while the southbound island platform was extended 135 feet (41 m) south, necessitating the replacement of some structural steel girders. Six-car local trains began operating in October 1910. On January 23, 1911, ten-car express trains began running on the Lenox Avenue Line, and the next day, ten-car express trains were inaugurated on the West Side Line.

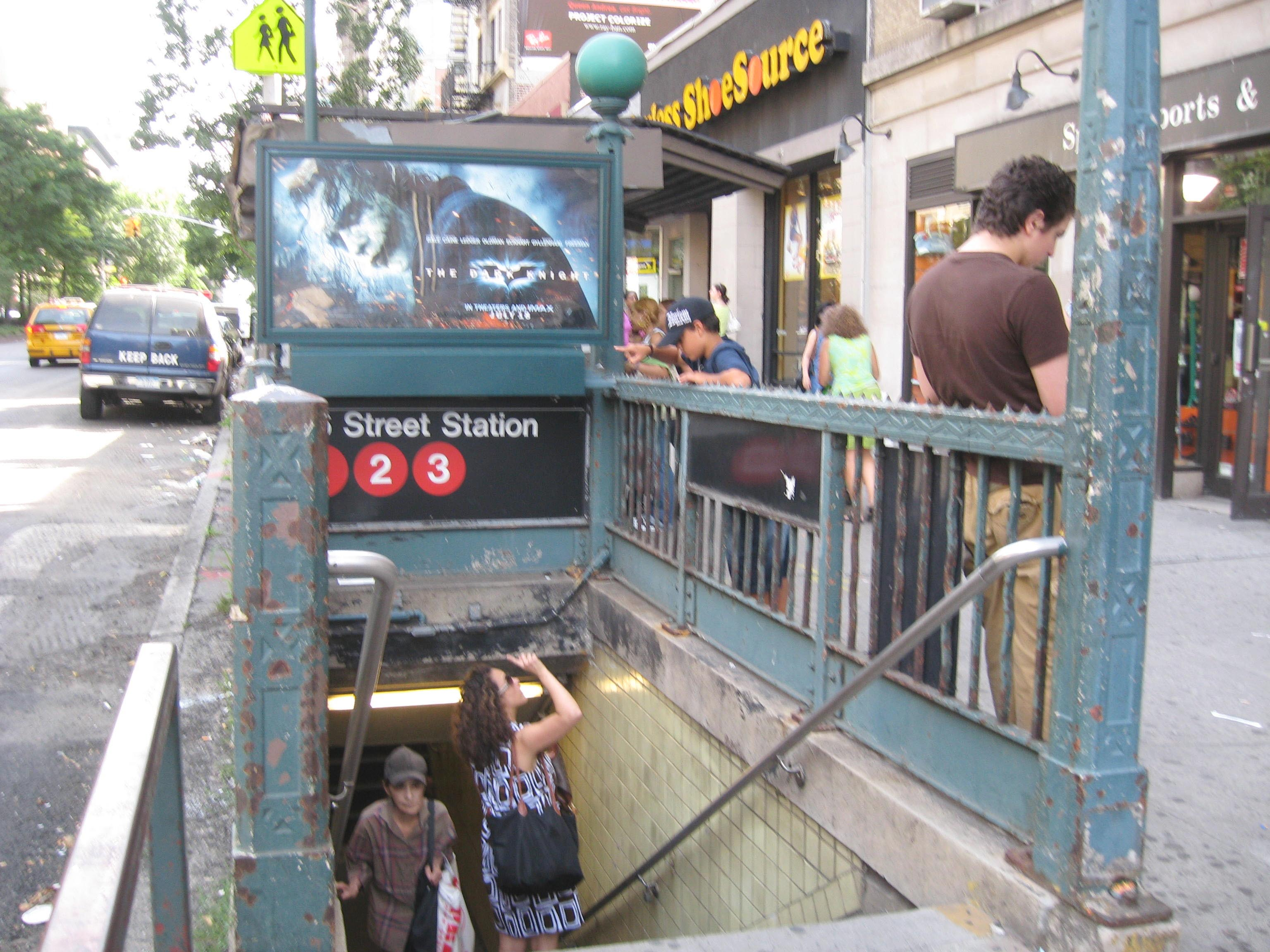
The former southbound entrance at 94th Street, seen in 2008

In 1915, the IRT considered constructing a new mezzanine and entrance at the southern end of the station leading to the central mall of Broadway at 94th Street, at an estimated cost of $60,000. The additional entrance would have reduced congestion at the station and reduced travel times for people south of 94th Street. In addition, two additional staircases would have been constructed to each island platform. Plans were prepared in 1923. The IRT sent a proposed agreement for the construction of the entrance to the New York City Board of Estimate, but the Board of Estimate suggested that staircases be constructed on the sidewalk. The IRT decided not to pursue this option since it would cost twice as much, or $100,000, and decided not to construct a new entrance at the southern end of the station at the time. In 1918, the Broadway–Seventh Avenue Line opened south of Times Square–42nd Street, and the original line was divided into an H-shaped system. The original subway north of Times Square thus became part of the Broadway–Seventh Avenue Line. Local trains (Broadway and Lenox Avenue) were sent to South Ferry, while express trains (Broadway and West Farms) used the new Clark Street Tunnel to Brooklyn.

=== Mid- and late 20th century ===
The city government took over the IRT's operations on June 12, 1940. The IRT routes were given numbered designations in 1948 with the introduction of "R-type" rolling stock, which contained rollsigns with numbered designations for each service. The Broadway route to 242nd Street became known as the 1, the White Plains Road (formerly West Farms) route as the 2, and the Lenox Avenue route as the 3. There was still a bottleneck at 96th Street. By 1955, the bottleneck forced some southbound express trains from the 242nd Street branch to remain on the local track at 96th Street, skipping local stops before switching to the express track at 72nd Street.

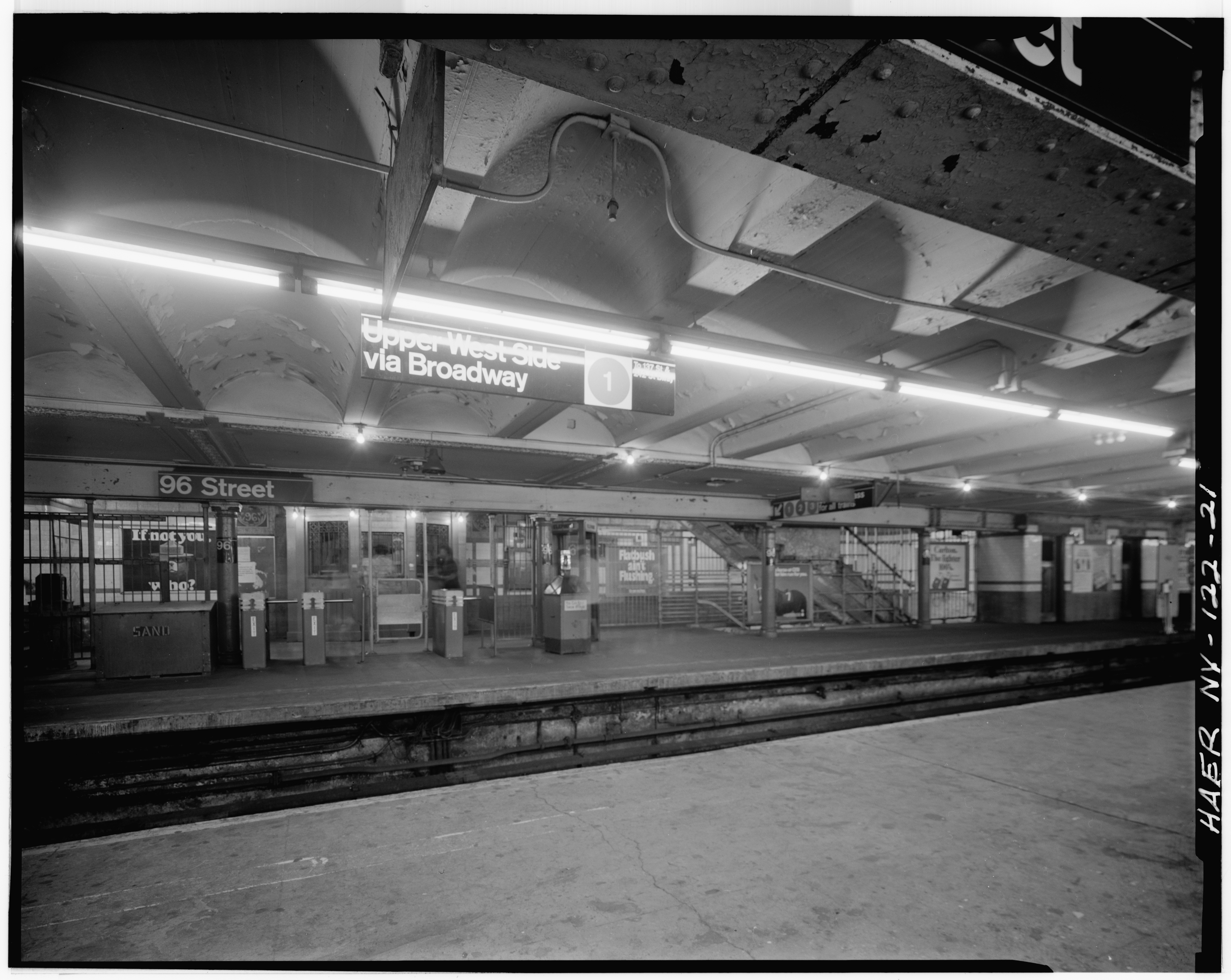
Former fare control area on the now-closed uptown side platform in 1978

On June 14, 1956, the New York City Transit Authority (NYCTA) announced a $100 million (equivalent to $1.2 billion) project to modernize the IRT Broadway—Seventh Avenue Line and improve service. It was estimated that the project would be completed in 2.5 years. In 1957, work began to lengthen station platforms between Times Square and 96th Street, with the exception of 91st Street, to 525 feet (160 m) to accommodate ten-car trains. Originally, stations north of Times Squares could barely fit local trains of five or six cars depending on the configuration of the trains. In 1960, work was completed on improvements at the 96th Street station, including the installation of fluorescent lighting, as well as platform extensions. To make room for the extensions, the local tracks and the outside walls had to be moved. A new mezzanine with stairways to the street, and direct access to both express platforms, was built between 93rd and 94th Streets.

Once most of the work on the project was completed on February 6, 1959, all 1 trains became local, running at an increased frequency with eight-car trains, and all 2 and 3 trains became express. Due to the lengthening of the platforms at 86th Street and 96th Street, the intermediate 91st Street station was closed on February 2, 1959, because it was too close to the other two stations. In November 1959, the Warshaw Construction Company received a contract to remove 15 entrance/exit kiosks on IRT lines, including four at the 96th Street station. This was part of a citywide initiative to remove the kiosks, which obstructed motorists' views of pedestrians.

On August 9, 1964, the NYCTA announced the letting of a $7.6 million (equivalent to $78.9 million) contract to lengthen platforms at stations from Rector Street to 34th Street–Penn Station on the line, and stations from 110th Street–Malcolm X Plaza to 145th Street on the Lenox Avenue Line. This would allow express trains to be lengthened from nine cars to ten, and to lengthen locals from eight cars to ten. In 1977, a special committee of the NYCTA Board issued a report advising the MTA to halt plans to reduce the hours of 21 token booths, including that at the 96th Street station. A member of the special committee said that the savings from reducing the hours at token booths often was not significant enough to outweigh inconveniences to riders. By 1981, the Metropolitan Transportation Authority had listed the station among the 69 most deteriorated stations in the subway system. In 1983, the MTA added funding for a renovation of the 96th Street station to its 1980–1984 capital plan.

The 96th Street station was the location of a chase scene in the 1979 cult film The Warriors, but the scenes were actually filmed at the unused outer tracks of the Hoyt–Schermerhorn Streets station on the IND Fulton Street Line in Brooklyn. The exterior shots were filmed at the 72nd Street station.

=== 21st century ===
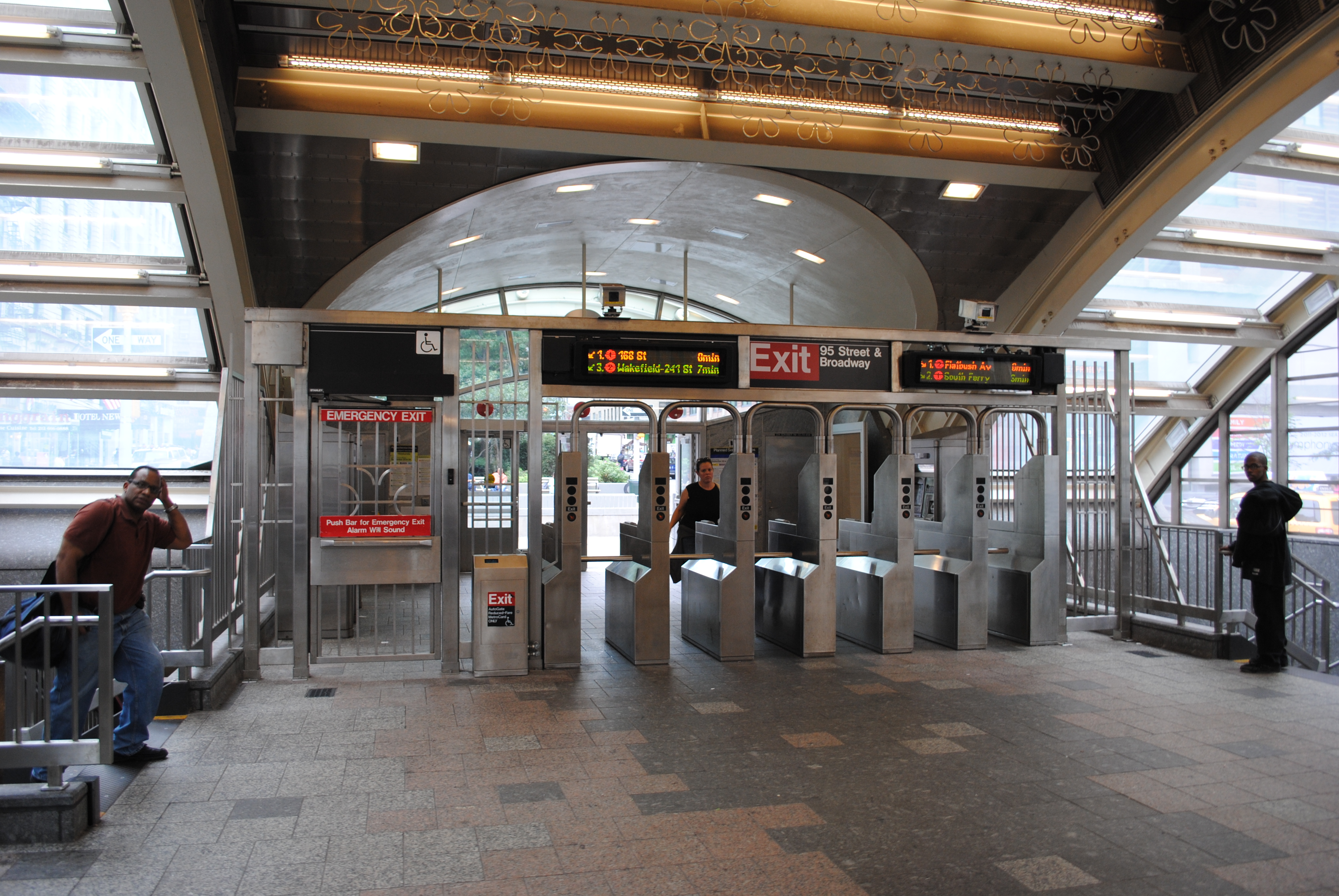
Inside of the new headhouse as seen in 2015

In July 2006, Manhattan Community Board 7 approved an $80 million renovation of the station. Construction started in 2007 on a new head house in the median of Broadway between 95th and 96th Streets, with elevators to the platforms to comply with the Americans with Disabilities Act of 1990 (ADA). Broadway was reconfigured for four blocks to accommodate this. By 2008, renovation of the 40,000 square feet (3,716 m^{2}) station was nearly finished below budget (only $65 million was used to complete the renovation) and on schedule. Urbahn Architects also restored the platform level to its original design. By 2009, the opening of the new head house was set to be 20 months early and $26 million cheaper due to budget cuts.

The new head house opened on April 5, 2010, and replaced the underpass and side platforms. The side platforms became office and control space, and the entrances were removed to accommodate narrowed sidewalks to offset the new head house's protrusion into the roadway. The elevators opened on November 9, 2010, making the station wheelchair-accessible. Local residents voiced dissatisfaction with the significant loss of sidewalks adjacent to businesses. The intersection of 96th Street and Broadway saw numerous pedestrian and vehicular crashes after its completion; the New York Daily News called the crossing to the new station entrance "treacherous" in 2014.

An out-of-service 1 train collided with a revenue-service train near the station on January 4, 2024, injuring 26 on the latter train; an investigation found that the crash might have been caused by human error. The MTA announced in late 2025 that a customer service center would open at the station; the center opened in January 2026.

== Station layout ==
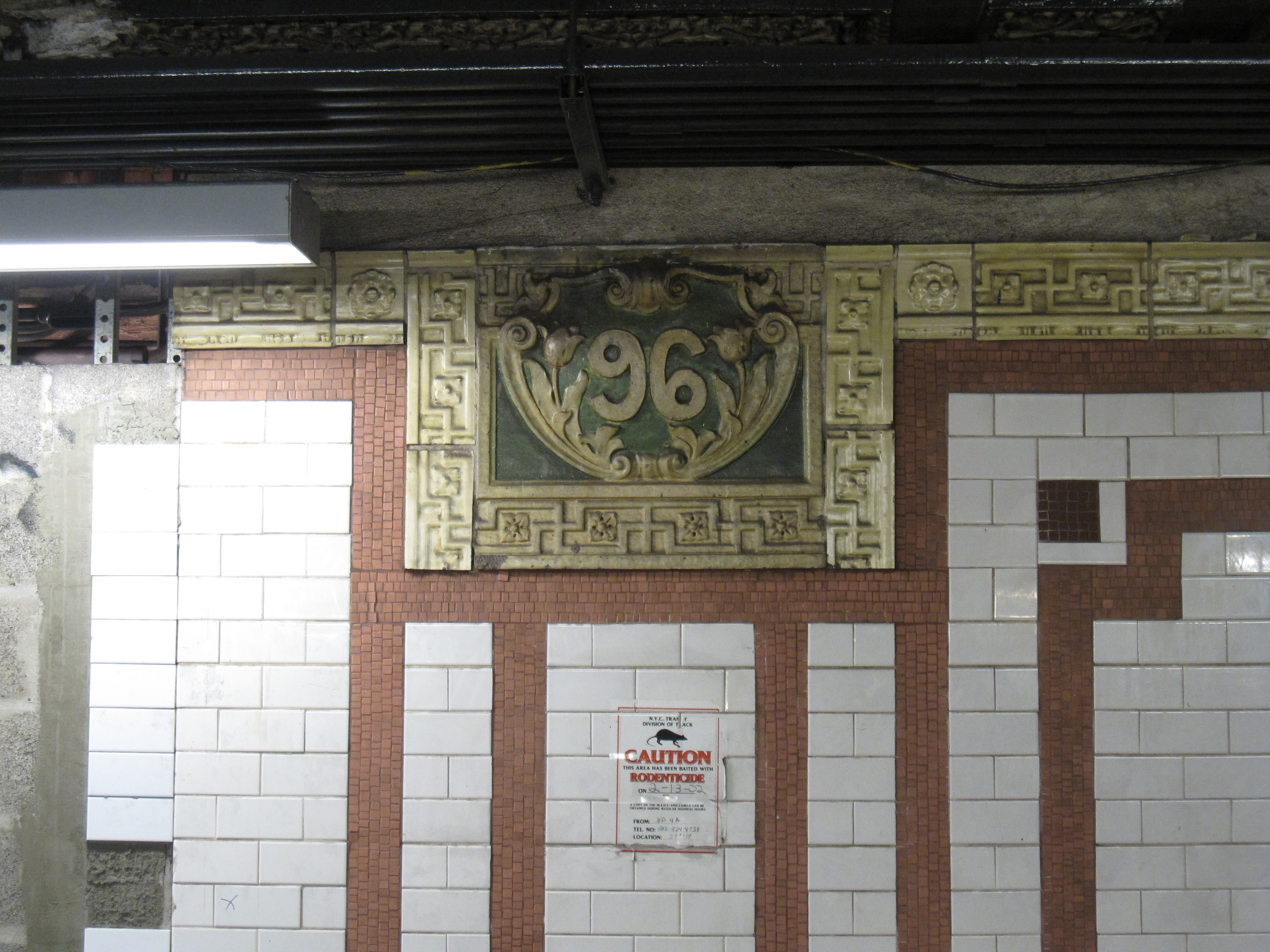
Original cartouche on the wall with the number "96"

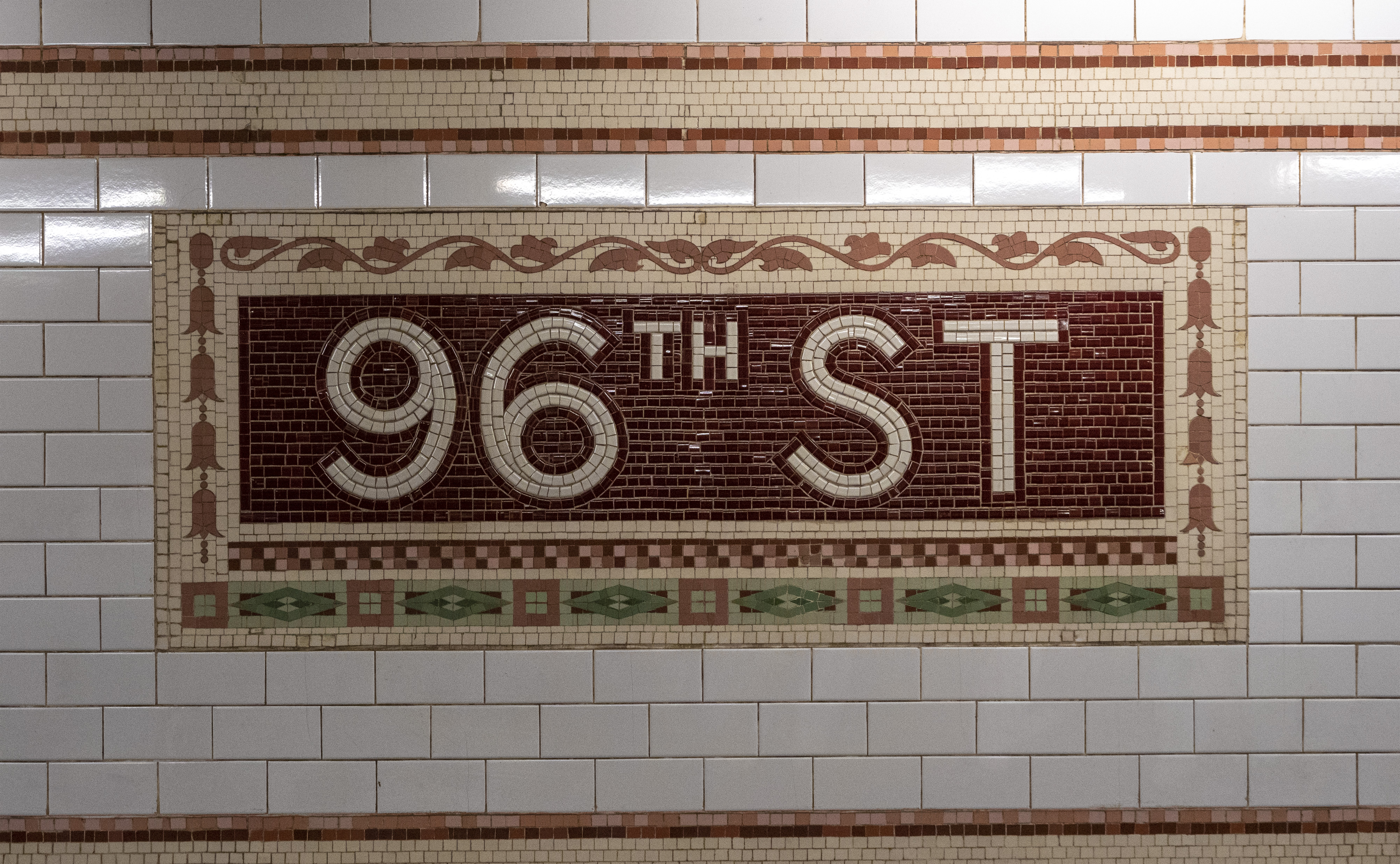
Recreation of original mosaic name tablet

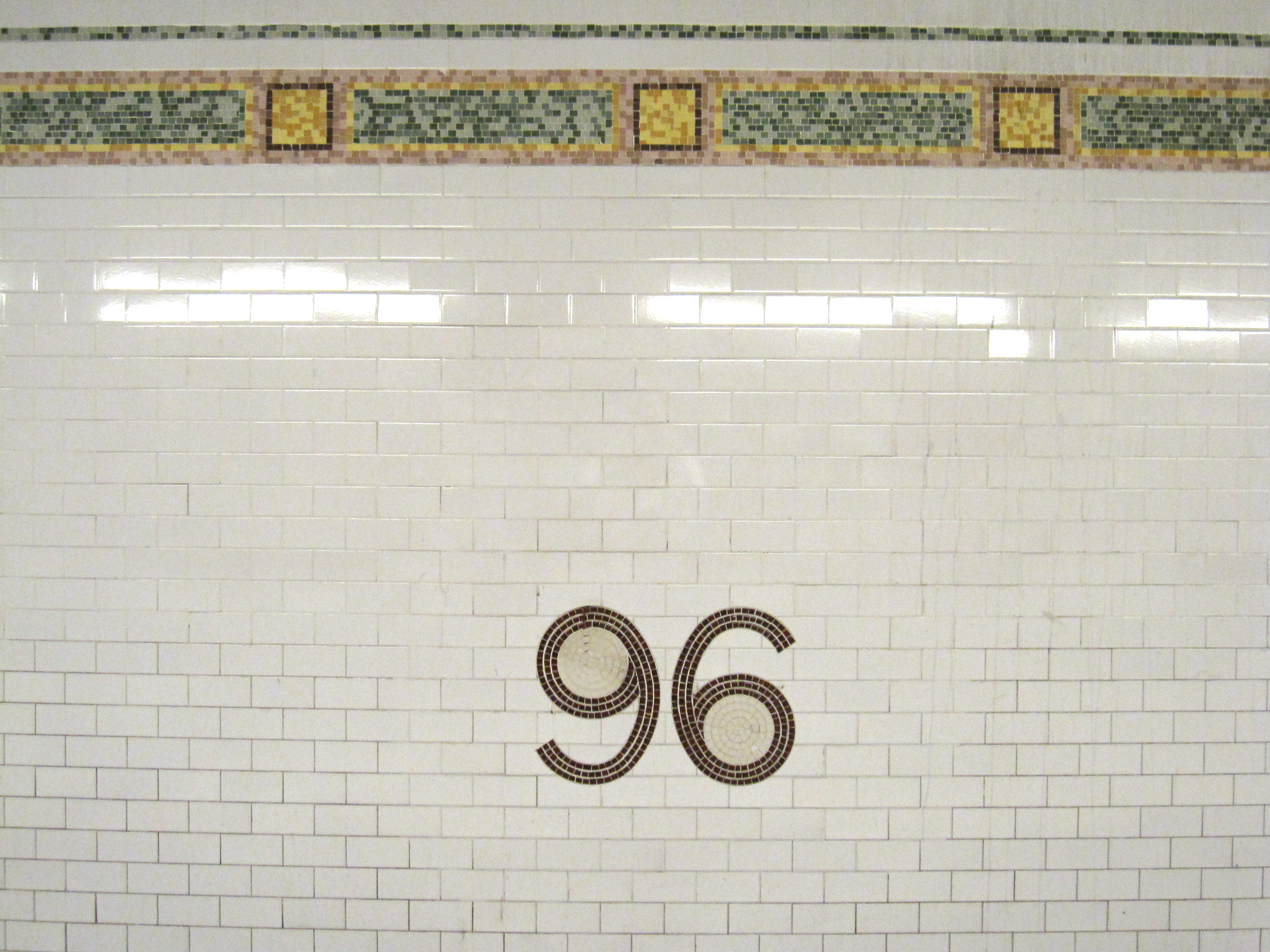
Modern wall mosaics

96th Street contains four tracks and two island platforms that allow for cross-platform interchanges between local and express trains heading in the same direction. Express trains run on the innermost two tracks, while local trains run on the outer pair. The local tracks are used by the 1 train at all times and by the 2 train during the night; the express tracks are used by the 2 train during daytime hours and by the 3 train at all times. The next stop to the north is 103rd Street for 1 trains and 110th Street–Malcolm X Plaza for 2 and 3 trains. The next stop to the south is 86th Street for local trains and 72nd Street for express trains. When the subway opened, the next local stop to the south was 91st Street; that station closed in the mid-20th century.

The 96th Street station is fully wheelchair-accessible, with elevators connecting the street and platforms. As a result of the 1958–1959 platform extension, the platforms are 520 feet (160 m) long. During normal service, southbound local trains use track B1 and southbound express trains use track B2. Northbound express trains use track B3 and northbound local trains use track B4. These track designations are not posted in the station, but are used in the chaining of each track, used to measure distance by train crews on the subway.

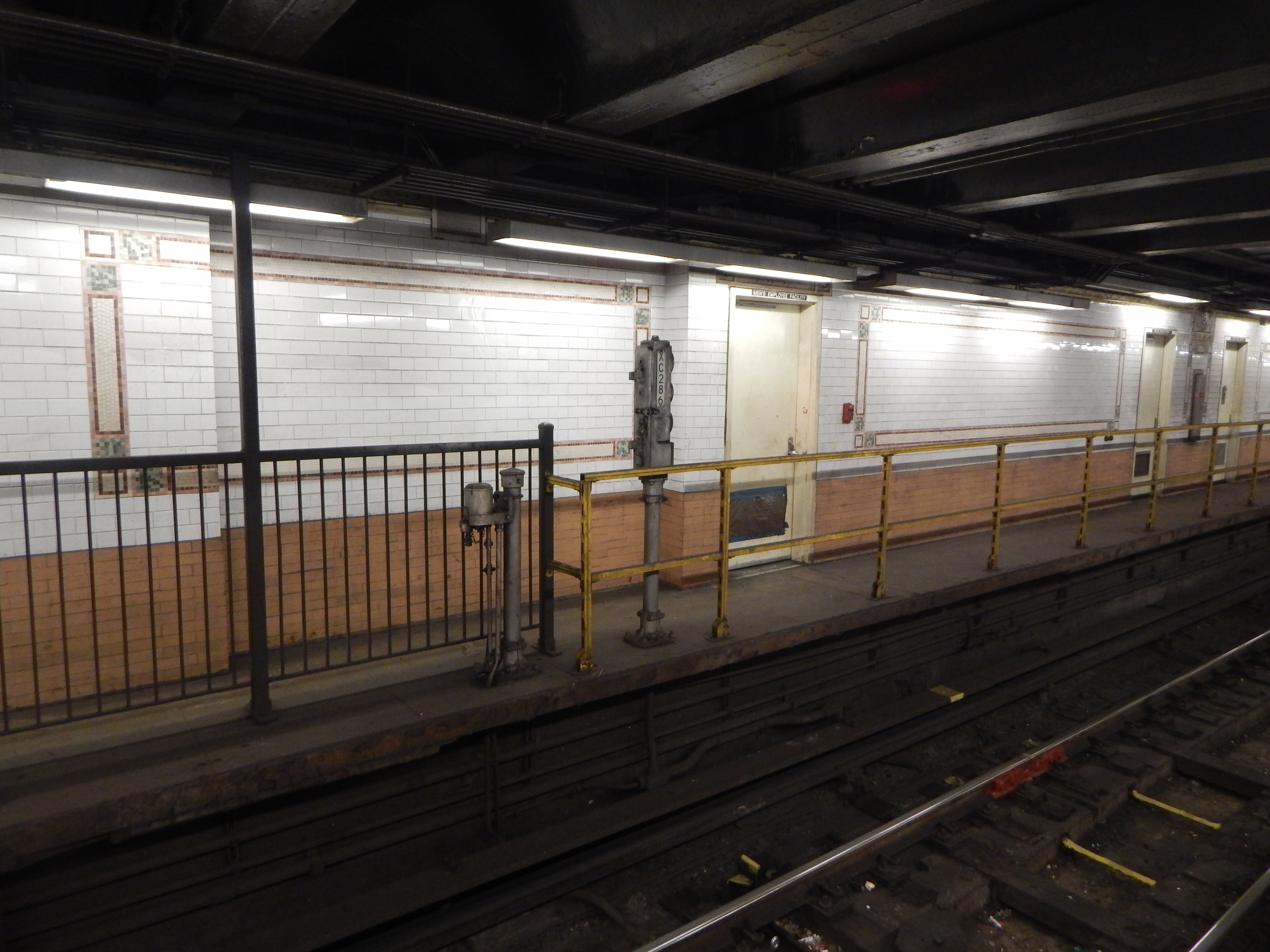
View of unused side platform

There are two unused side platforms, one beside either local track. A combination of island and side platforms was also used at Brooklyn Bridge–City Hall and 14th Street–Union Square on the IRT Lexington Avenue Line. As originally intended, the island platforms facilitated an easy transfer between local and express trains, while the shorter side platforms provided easy access from local trains to the street. When the subway first opened, it was possible to open both sides of the train at once. As this is not practical on more modern trains, only the doors facing the island platforms are used (to permit transfers between local and express trains), and the side platforms were abandoned. The unused side platforms have been turned into storage space and offices.

Before the completion of the main head house in 2010, the station could be entered through stairways along the sidewalks of Broadway, to the extreme north end of the side platforms, then to the island platforms via an underpass. Engineers were unable to build a mezzanine level similar to other express stations for a few reasons. First, directly to the north of the station is an interlocking, and trains heading to the two branches are at the greatest gradients trains can operate on. Lowering the station to provide ample space for a mezzanine would have led to gradients that would have hindered efficient train operation. In addition, it was determined to be too costly to lower a large 6.5 feet (2.0 m)-wide trunk sewer in 96th Street, which was at the bottom of a drainage valley, enough to provide room for a mezzanine. The sewer was lowered 2.25 feet (0.69 m), when an additional 7 to 8 feet (2.1 to 2.4 m) of lowering would be needed to fit a mezzanine.

=== Design ===
As with other stations built as part of the original IRT, the station was constructed using a cut-and-cover method. The tunnel is covered by a U-shaped trough that contains utility pipes and wires. This trough contains a foundation of concrete no less than 4 inches (100 mm) thick. Each platform consists of 3-inch-thick (76 mm) concrete slabs, beneath which are drainage basins. The original platforms contain circular, cast-iron Doric-style columns spaced every 15 feet (4.6 m), while the platform extensions contain I-beam columns. Additional columns between the tracks, spaced every 5 feet (1.5 m), support the jack-arched concrete station roofs. There is a 1-inch (25 mm) gap between the trough wall and the platform walls, which are made of 4-inch (100 mm)-thick brick covered over by a tiled finish.

The decorative scheme consists of red tile tablets, pink tile bands, a buff cornice, and buff plaques. The mosaic tiles at all original IRT stations were manufactured by the American Encaustic Tile Company, which subcontracted the installations at each station. The decorative work was performed by tile contractor Alfred Boote Company.

=== Track layout ===
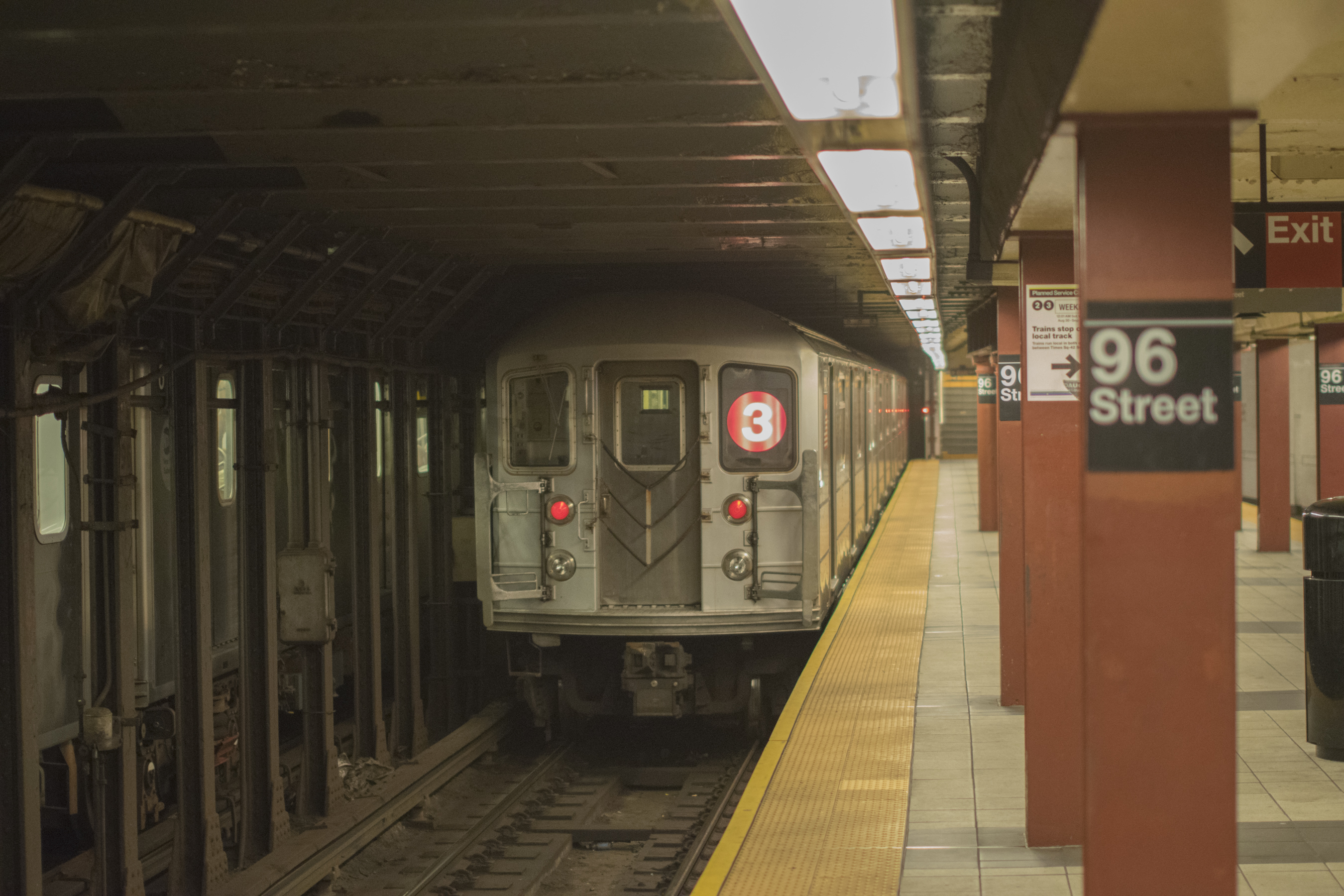
Southbound R62 3 train leaving the station

North of 96th Street, there are crossovers between the uptown and downtown pairs of tracks, and between the express tracks. The express tracks then descend, turn east under West 104th Street, and run northeast under Central Park on the way to the IRT Lenox Avenue Line at West 110th Street. The local tracks remain on the upper level to the end of the line in Riverdale, Bronx. After the express tracks diverge, a center track starts at approximately 100th Street; it is not in regular use.

Some evidence remains of the 96th Street Improvement of 1907. As part of the project, one additional track would have run from 96th Street along the east side of Broadway, branching off the northbound local track and descending to the lower level, with a spur connecting to the Lenox tracks at 100th Street. The new northbound track would have then risen and merged with the northbound local track at 102nd Street. At 100th Street, a spur would connect to the other tracks. Two additional tracks would have been constructed, running along the west side of Broadway from 96th Street to 101st Street. The first of these would have branched off of the southbound local track and run parallel before merging back into that track at 101st Street. The second would have diverged from the first additional track on the west side of Broadway, and would run parallel and at the same grade until 98th Street. Here, the track would descend to the lower level. At 101st Street the track would curve and connect with the southbound track of the Lenox Avenue Line. The completed parts of this project include the third northbound track, which was finished by February 1908.

=== Entrances and exits ===
==== Current exits ====
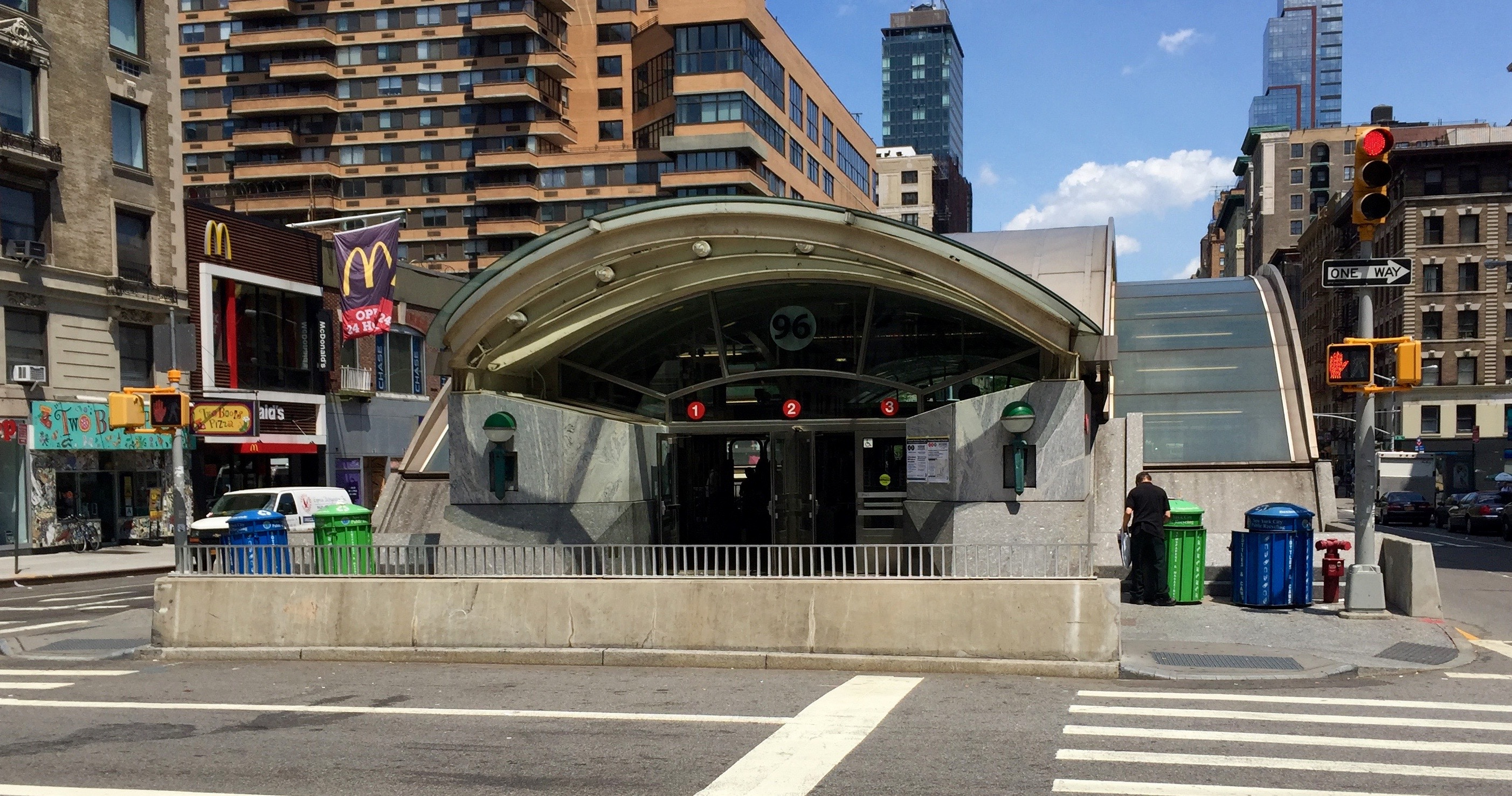
Completed new head house on the Broadway median between 95th and 96th Streets

There are two sets of entrances and exits at the station. The main, ADA-accessible entrance is through a domed, glass-clad head house on the Broadway median between 95th and 96th Streets. According to its designer, Urbahn Architects, the structure "is a reinterpretation of the archetypal 19th Century train shed", with a vaulted titanium roof. Entrances are on both the 95th and 96th Street sides of the head house. Above each of the head house's entrances, the entrance's name plaque reads simply "96" in white letters upon glass, and light-up red circles containing the numbers "1", "2", and "3", the services of the IRT Broadway–Seventh Avenue Line. On the 96th Street side, there is a fare booth.

The head house contains an artwork by Sigi Moeslinger and Masamichi Udagawa titled Bloemendaal. The name recalls the historical name of the Bloomingdale neighborhood. The work consists of 180 stainless-steel flowers, each weighing 3 pounds (1.4 kg). The flowers are placed on seven ceiling beams 12 feet (3.7 m) high and can shake slightly to give the impression of a "shimmering garden".

There are two staircases each at the southeastern and southwestern corners of 94th Street and Broadway. There is a crossover within fare control at this end of the station.

==== Former exits ====
There were two staircases at the intersection of 96th Street and Broadway, one each at the southeastern and southwestern corners. (Note: Google Maps Street View picture of the staircases in 2009. The same intersection in 2015. The staircases no longer exist.) Although fare control was at platform level (on the unused side platforms), there was a free cross-under at this end of the station upon entering the paid area. The staircases closed when the head house opened on April 5, 2010, but part of the original cross-under remains inside the fare control.

There was a control house in the median of Broadway (now removed), which dated to the station's opening in 1904. It was built as one of several station houses on the original IRT; similar station houses were built at Bowling Green and 72nd, 103rd, and 116th Streets.
