= VA-96 (U.S. Navy) =

Attack Squadron 96
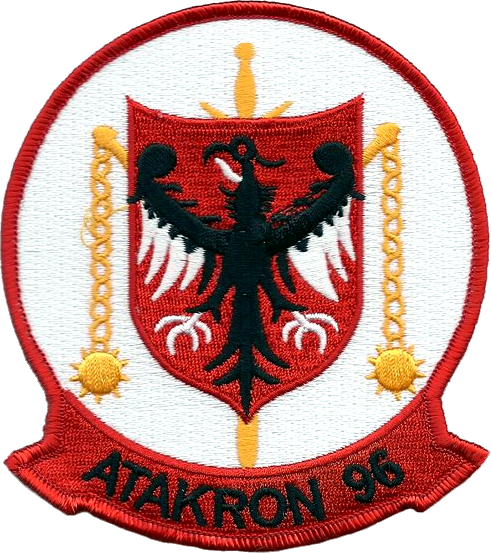
- Active: 30 June 1956 – 10 April 1958
- Country: United States
- Branch: United States Navy
- Type: Attack

Aircraft flown
- Attack: AD Skyraider

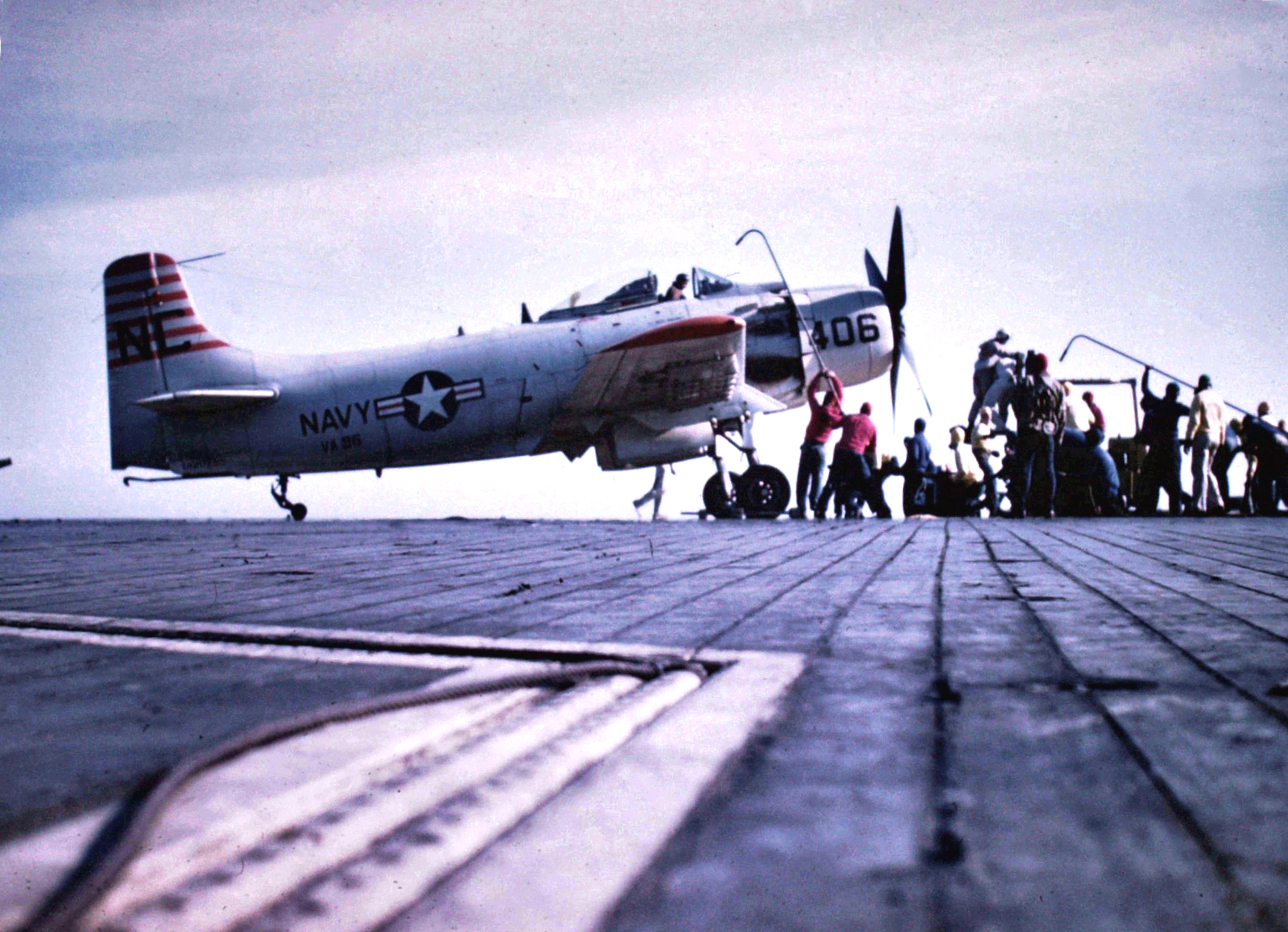
An AD-6 from VA-96

VA-96 was a short-lived Attack Squadron of the United States Navy. It was established on 30 June 1956, and disestablished less than two years later, on 10 April 1958. Its nickname is unknown.

== Significant events ==
- 4 Jun 1957: The squadron's commanding officer, Commander M. K. Dennis, was lost in a night midair collision while operating from USS Kearsarge off the coast of California.
- Sep 1957: Kearsarge operated in the vicinity of Taiwan following the buildup of Chinese communist forces opposite the offshore islands belonging to Taiwan.

== Home port assignments ==
The squadron was assigned to these home ports, effective on the dates shown:

- NAS Miramar – 30 Jun 1956
- NAS Moffett Field – Aug 1956

== Aircraft assignment ==
The squadron first received the following aircraft on the dates shown:

- AD-6 Skyraider – Jul 1956
- AD-7 Skyraider – Mar 1957

== See also ==
- Attack aircraft
- List of inactive United States Navy aircraft squadrons
- History of the United States Navy
