= 96th Squadron =

In military terms, 96th Squadron or 96 Squadron may refer to:

- 96th Airlift Squadron, a United States Army Air Force unit
- 96th Air Refueling Squadron, a United States Army Air Force unit
- 96th Aero Squadron, a World War I United States Army Air Service unit
- 96th Bomb Squadron, a United States Army Air Force unit
- 96th Flying Training Squadron, a United States Army Air Force unit
- 96th Troop Carrier Squadron, a World War II United States Army Air Forces unit
- No. 96 Squadron RAF, a unit of the United Kingdom
- VA-96 (U.S. Navy)
- VF-96, a United States Navy unit
