= 96th Regiment of Foot (1760) =

- Active: 20 January 1760 – 1763
- Country: Kingdom of Great Britain (1777–1800)
- Branch: British Army
- Type: Infantry

Commanders
- Colonel of the Regiment: Colonel Hon. George Monson

The 96th Regiment of Foot was a short-lived infantry regiment of the British Army which was raised during the Seven Years' War and existed from 1760-1763.

The regiment was posted to India, where the British East India Company were engaged in hostilities with the French and the Mughal emperors. After taking part in the siege of Pondicherry they were engaged in the Battle of Buxar, in which the East India Company, supported by British Army troops, defeated the combined Mughal forces in the Ganges valley during the Carnatic War. This pivotal British victory sealed the fate of Mughal domination of North India.

The regiment were disbanded in 1763 following the Treaty of Paris.

The Colonel Commandant throughout its existence was Colonel Hon. George Monson.
