= 96th Division =

In military terms, 96th Division or 96th Infantry Division may refer to:

== Infantry divisions ==
- 96th Infantry Division (German Empire)
- 96th Infantry Division (Wehrmacht), Germany
- 96th Division (Israel)
- 96th Division (Imperial Japanese Army)
- 96th Guards Rifle Division, Soviet Union
- 96th Rifle Division, Soviet Union
- 96th Infantry Division (United States)

== Aviation divisions ==
- 96th Air Division, United States

== See also ==
- List of military divisions by number
- 96th Brigade (disambiguation)
- 96th Regiment (disambiguation)
- 96th Squadron (disambiguation)
