= Head house =

Type of building

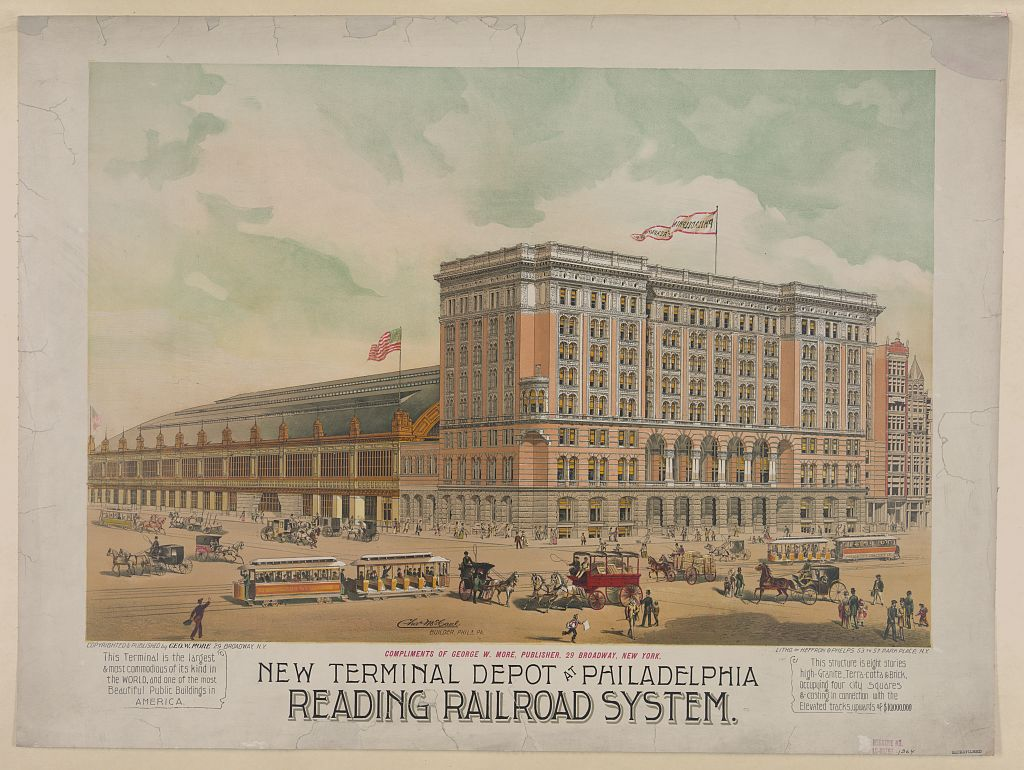
The Reading Terminal in Philadelphia, showing a nine-story brick head house to the right and arched train shed (with market below) to the left.

A head house or headhouse is an enclosed building attached to an open-sided shed, including one with piers extending into a waterway, or the aboveground part of a train or subway station.

== Markets ==
In the 18th and early 19th centuries, head houses were often civic buildings such as town halls or courthouses located at the end of an open market shed; one example is the former market and firehouse from which Philadelphia's Head House Square takes its name.

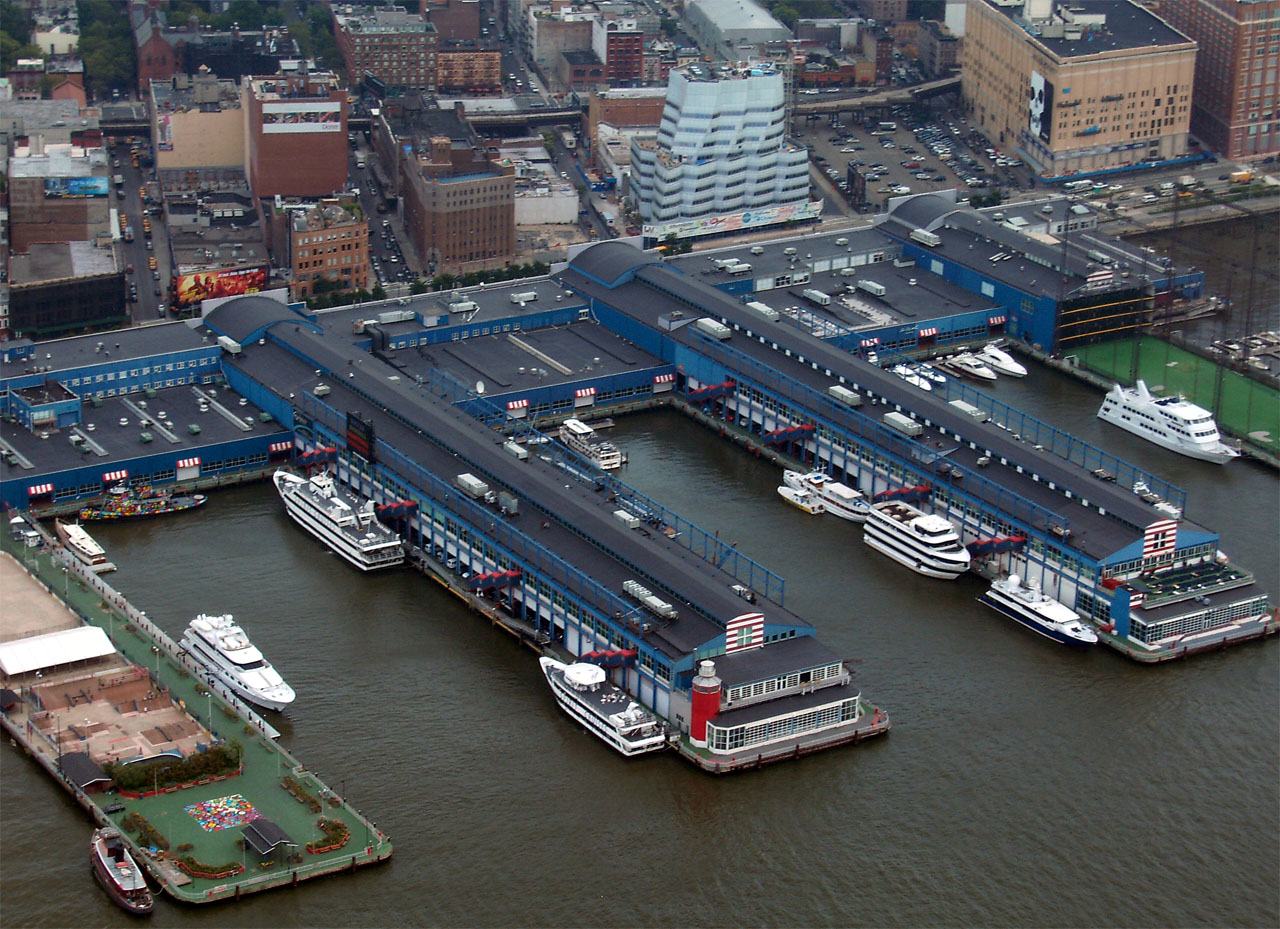
New York's Chelsea Piers complex, showing the shore-side head house running perpendicular to, and connecting, Piers 62 to 59 (from left to right), which extend into the Hudson River.

== Mines ==
In mining, a headhouse is the housing of the headworks of various types of machinery used for moving coal to the surface, or men to or from it.

== Transportation ==
=== Railroads ===
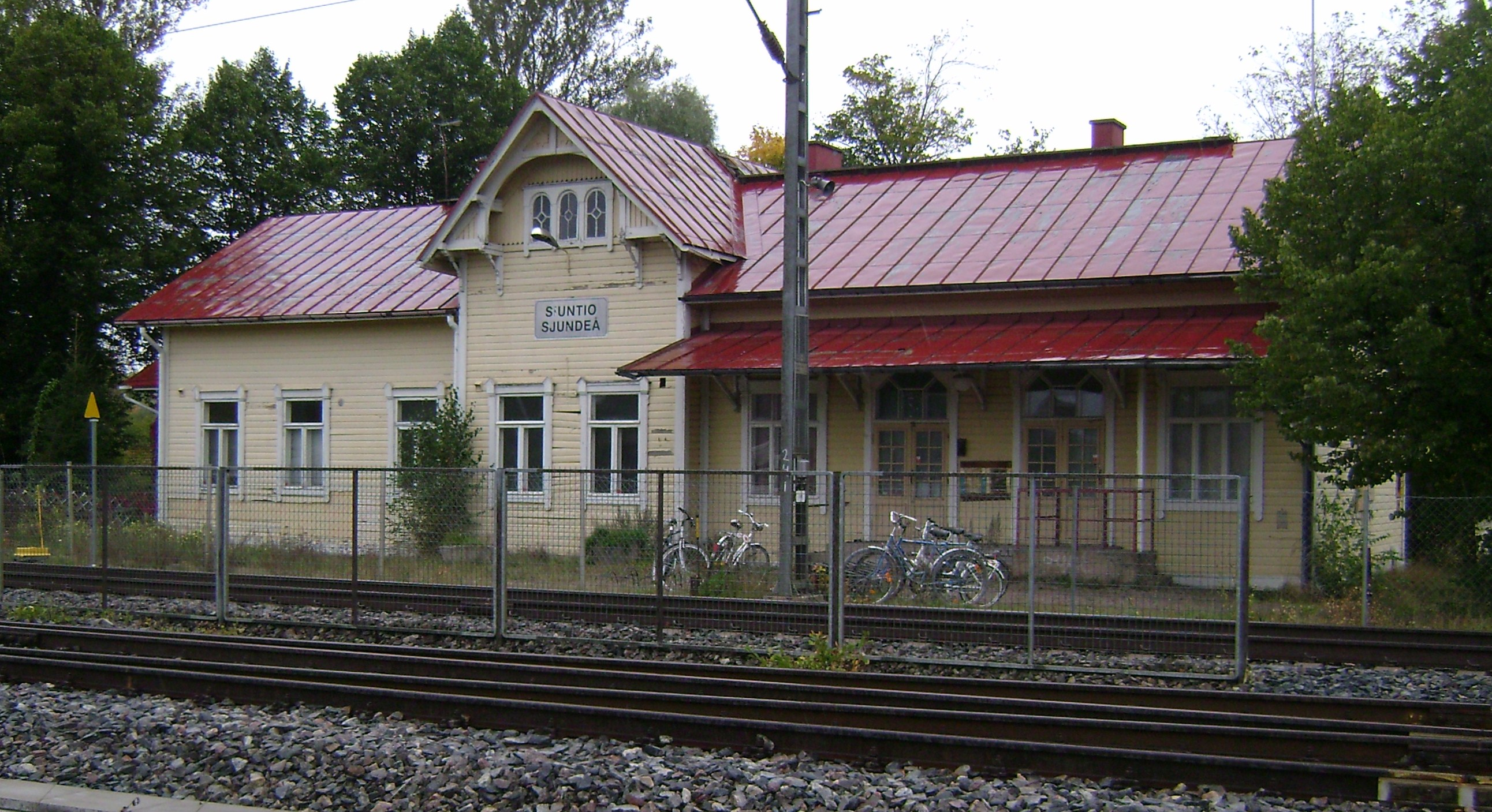
A station building of Siuntio railway station in Siuntio, Finland

In the United States since the mid-19th century, a head house has often been the part of a passenger train station that does not house the tracks and platforms. Elsewhere, the same part of a station is known as the station building.

In particular, it often contains the ticket counters, waiting rooms, toilets and baggage facilities. It might also include the passenger concourses and walkways between the platforms and other facilities. The head house at Philadelphia's Reading Terminal, which fronts a two level shed with tracks and platforms placed above a covered market, combined both the older and newer meanings of the word.

Larger terminals had amenities that were contained within their own distinct building, which was separate from the railroad. For instance, when Cincinnati Union Terminal opened in 1933, the head house held a restaurant, lunch room, ice cream shop, news agent, drug store, small movie theater, men's and women's lounges, and restrooms that included changing rooms and showers.

=== Subways ===
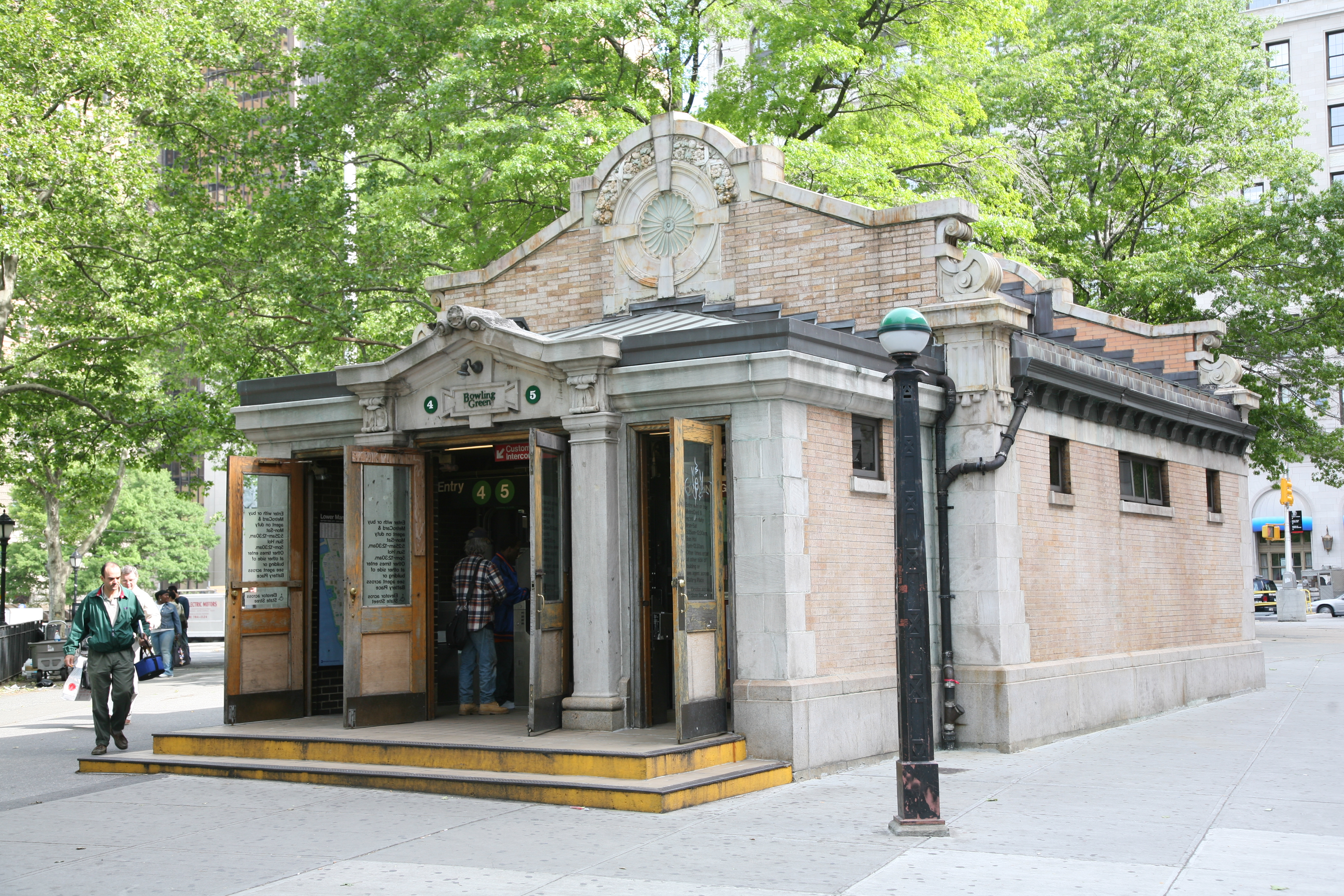
The head house to Bowling Green subway station in New York City

In subway systems, a head house is the part of a subway station that is above ground, which contains escalators, elevators and ticket agents.

On the New York City Subway, a head house is called a "Control House". They were built, and are still used in certain locations (such as at Broadway and West 72nd Street), where a simple staircase or kiosk was not desirable. During the design and construction of the city's original subway line opened by the Interborough Rapid Transit Company (IRT) in 1904, control houses were treated as integral architectural features of the system. In 1901, William Barclay Parsons, chief engineer for the Board of Rapid Transit Railroad Commissioners, had traveled to Boston with architect Christopher LaFarge, where he was apparently inspired by the ornamental houses he saw used as entrances to the Tremont Street subway. In response, architects Heins & LaFarge designed each IRT control house to be an attractive exterior feature of the transit network system that was in keeping with its location. The buildings, which are examples of the Beaux-Arts style, are similar to other ground-level structures on the IRT, such as the powerhouses and sub-stations.

== See also ==
- Baltimore's former President Street Station, now the Baltimore Civil War Museum
- former Chicago and North Western Terminal
- former Grand Central Depot in New York City
- Howrah Junction railway station in India
- Reading Terminal in Philadelphia
- Chicago Union Station
- St. Louis Union Station
- Washington Union Station
