= 96th Brigade =

96th Brigade may refer to:

== Russia ==
- 96th Reconnaissance Brigade

== Spain ==
- 96th Mixed Brigade, see Mixed brigade § 1st to 100th

== Ukraine ==
- 96th Anti-aircraft Missile Brigade

== United Kingdom ==
- 96th Brigade (United Kingdom)
- 96th Brigade, Royal Field Artillery, a British Army unit during World War I
- 96th (Royal Devon Yeomanry) Brigade, Royal Field Artillery, a British Army unit after World War I

== United States ==
- 96th Sustainment Brigade

== See also ==
- 96th Division (disambiguation)
- 96th Regiment (disambiguation)
