= Manhattan Valley Viaduct =

Manhattan Valley Viaduct may refer to either of two crossings of Manhattan Valley:

- Riverside Drive Viaduct
- The IRT Broadway Line Viaduct, formerly known as the Manhattan Valley Viaduct, supporting IRT Broadway–Seventh Avenue Line 125th Street station
