= Cathedral Parkway (disambiguation) =

Cathedral Parkway may refer to:

- 110th Street (Manhattan), a street in New York City also known as Cathedral Parkway

== New York City Subway ==
- Cathedral Parkway – 110th Street (IRT Broadway – Seventh Avenue Line), serving the 1 train
- Cathedral Parkway – 110th Street (IND Eighth Avenue Line), serving the A, B, and C trains
