= 125th Street station (IRT Broadway–Seventh Avenue Line) =

New York City Subway station in Manhattan

125 Street
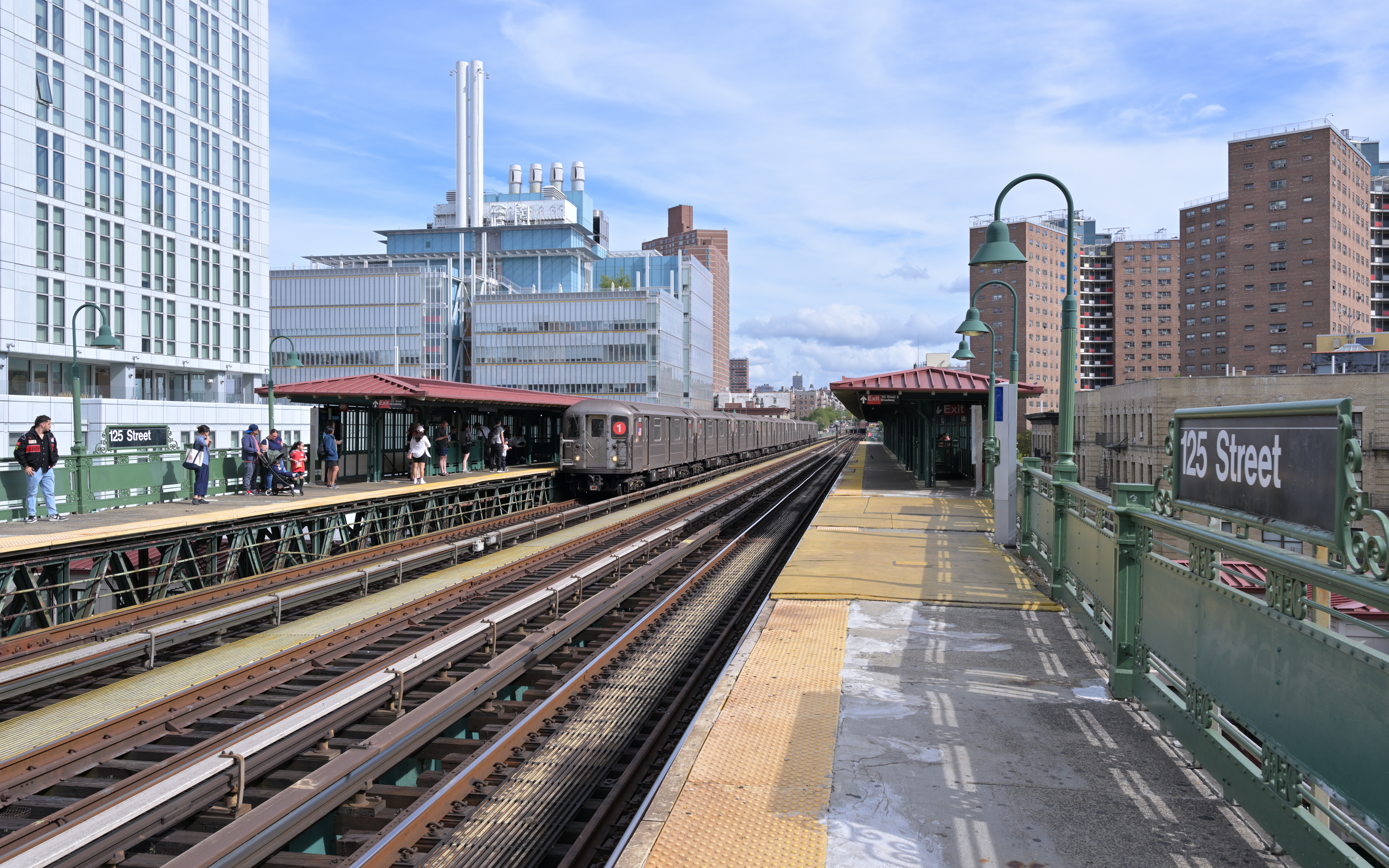
- A southbound 1 train arrives at 125th Street.

Station statistics
- Address: West 125th Street & Broadway; New York, New York
- Borough: Manhattan
- Locale: Manhattanville, Morningside Heights
- Coordinates: 40.815°N 73.958°W
- Division: A (IRT)
- Line: IRT Broadway–Seventh Avenue Line
- Services: 1 (all times)
- Transit: NYCT Bus: M4, M104, M125
- Structure: Elevated
- Platforms: 2 side platforms
- Tracks: 3 (2 in regular service)

Other information
- Opened: October 27, 1904; 122 years ago
- Accessible: No; planned
- Former/other names: Manhattan Street

Traffic
- 2025: 2,089,879 ▲5.7%
- Rank: 175 out of 423
Services
Preceding station	New York City Subway	Following station
137th Street–City College toward Van Cortlandt Park–242nd Street	Local	116th Street–Columbia University toward South Ferry
Location
Location within New York City Subway
Location within New York City
Location within New York
Track layout
Street map
Station service legend
Symbol	Description
Stops all times	Stops all times
- IRT Broadway Line Viaduct (a.k.a.; Manhattan Valley Viaduct)
- U.S. National Register of Historic Places
- New York State Register of Historic Places
- New York City Landmark
- NRHP reference No.: 83001749
- NYSRHP No.: 06101.006462
- NYCL No.: 1094

Significant dates
- Added to NRHP: September 15, 1983
- Designated NYSRHP: August 15, 1983
- Designated NYCL: November 24, 1981

The 125th Street station (formerly the Manhattan Street station) is an elevated local station on the IRT Broadway–Seventh Avenue Line of the New York City Subway. Located at the intersection of 125th Street and Broadway, at the border of the Manhattanville and Morningside Heights neighborhoods of Manhattan, it is served by the 1 train at all times.

The 125th Street station was constructed for the Interborough Rapid Transit Company (IRT) as part of the city's first subway line, which was approved in 1900. Construction of the line segment that includes 125th Street began on June 18 of the same year. The station opened on October 27, 1904, as one of the original 28 stations of the New York City Subway. The station's platforms were lengthened in 1948, and the station was renovated in the 2000s.

The 125th Street station contains two side platforms and three tracks; the center track is not used in regular service. The station is the only one on the 2,174-foot-long (663 m) Manhattan Valley Viaduct, which carries the Broadway–Seventh Avenue Line across a natural valley surrounding 125th Street. The platforms contain windscreens and canopies. The station house beneath the platforms contains exits to 125th Street and Broadway. The Manhattan Valley Viaduct is a New York City designated landmark and listed on the National Register of Historic Places.

== History ==
=== Construction and opening ===
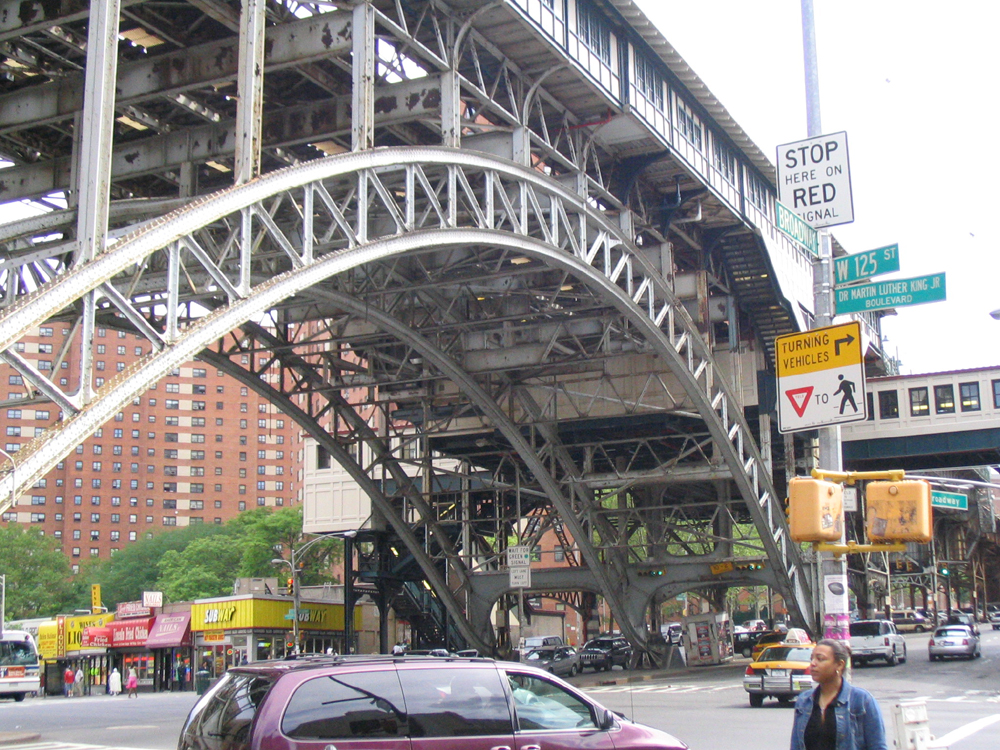
The station seen up close from Broadway

Planning for a subway line in New York City dates to 1864, but development of what became the city's first subway line did not start until 1894, when the New York State Legislature passed the Rapid Transit Act. The subway plans were drawn up by a team of engineers led by William Barclay Parsons, the Rapid Transit Commission's chief engineer. It called for a subway line from New York City Hall in Lower Manhattan to the Upper West Side, where two branches would lead north into the Bronx. A plan was formally adopted in 1897, and all legal conflicts over the route alignment were resolved near the end of 1899. The Rapid Transit Construction Company, organized by John B. McDonald and funded by August Belmont Jr., signed the initial Contract 1 with the Rapid Transit Commission in February 1900, under which it would construct the subway and maintain a 50-year operating lease from the opening of the line. Belmont incorporated the Interborough Rapid Transit Company (IRT) in April 1902 to operate the subway.

==== Viaduct ====
The Manhattan Street station was constructed as part of the IRT's West Side Line (now the Broadway–Seventh Avenue Line). While most of the original line was designed to be underground, the topography of Manhattanville necessitated the construction of a viaduct between 122nd and 135th Streets. At the time, the section of 125th Street in West Harlem was known as Manhattan Street; although engineers found that it was technically feasible to dig a tunnel under Manhattan Street, they concluded that such a tunnel would have required a steep grade. The IRT's engineers originally planned to build a standard elevated structure, similar to those built in other parts of the rapid transit system, with steel columns that supported plate girder spans. However, this plan would have required rerouting the Third Avenue/125th Street streetcar line, which ran along Manhattan Street. As such, prior to the start of construction, the plans were changed to a steel viaduct with a double-hinged arch. The elevated rail section runs from 122nd to 135th Street and was originally called the Manhattan Valley Viaduct. The name was changed to avoid confusion with the nearby viaduct over Riverside Drive, which also goes by this name. The aboveground railway has five sections: two embankments at either end, a truss arch over 125th Street, and plate girder bridges connecting the arch with the embankments on either side.

During the planning process, IRT engineers had considered constructing a two-track elevated spur from the viaduct, leading west to a ferry terminal to Fort Lee, New Jersey. The spur was approved in 1903, and engineers drew up detailed plans for the structure; however, this spur was never built. Work began on the viaduct over Manhattan Valley on June 1, 1901. Work on the stone piers and foundations for the viaduct was done by E. P. Roberts, while other work was done by Terry & Tench Construction Company. According to Tramway and Railway World magazine, the viaduct was built within two weeks. Because of delays in constructing the masonry abutment, a portion of the parabolic arch span was built first, followed by the rest of the viaduct. Normally, the side spans would have been built before the arch was constructed.

The section of the West Side Line around this station was originally planned as a two-track line, but in early 1901, was changed to a three-track structure to permit train storage in the center track. A third track was added directly north of 96th Street, immediately east of the originally planned two tracks. By late 1903, the subway was nearly complete, but the IRT Powerhouse and the system's electrical substations were still under construction, delaying the system's opening. The escalators had not been installed by the time the station was scheduled to open, forcing passengers to use temporary stairways. The 125th Street station opened on October 27, 1904, as the Manhattan Street station, one of the original 28 stations of the New York City Subway from City Hall to 145th Street on the West Side Branch.

=== Service changes and station renovations ===
==== 20th century ====
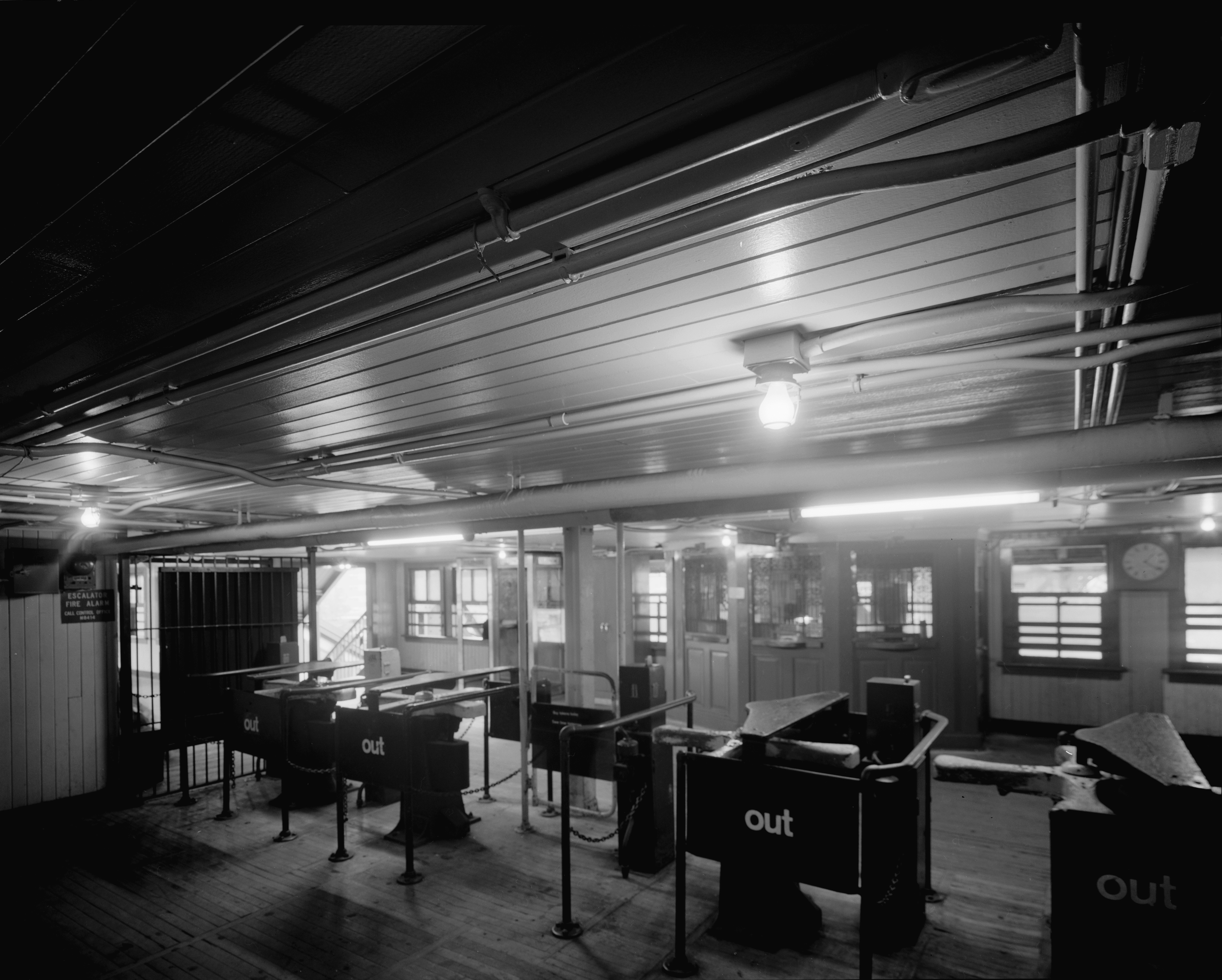
The station's entrance and turnstiles in 1978

After the first subway line was completed in 1908, the station was served by West Side local and express trains. Express trains began at South Ferry in Manhattan or Atlantic Avenue in Brooklyn, and ended at 242nd Street in the Bronx. Local trains ran from City Hall to 242nd Street during rush hours, continuing south from City Hall to South Ferry at other times. In 1918, the Broadway–Seventh Avenue Line opened south of Times Square–42nd Street, and the original line was divided into an H-shaped system. The original subway north of Times Square thus became part of the Broadway–Seventh Avenue Line. Local trains were sent to South Ferry, while express trains used the new Clark Street Tunnel to Brooklyn.

To address overcrowding, in 1909, the New York Public Service Commission proposed lengthening the platforms at stations along the original IRT subway. As part of a modification to the IRT's construction contracts made on January 18, 1910, the company was to lengthen station platforms to accommodate ten-car express and six-car local trains. In addition to $1.5 million (equivalent to $51.8 million in 2025) spent on platform lengthening, $500,000 (equivalent to $17.3 million in 2025) was spent on building additional entrances and exits. It was anticipated that these improvements would increase capacity by 25 percent. The northbound platform at the Manhattan Street station was extended about 98 feet (30 m) to the south, while the southbound platform was not lengthened. Six-car local trains began operating in October 1910, and ten-car express trains began running on the West Side Line on January 24, 1911. Subsequently, the station could accommodate six-car local trains, but ten-car trains could not open some of their doors.

Four stairways at the station were relocated, two stairways were added, and two passageways in the mezzanine were widened during Fiscal Year 1915. Manhattan Street was renamed 125th Street on April 24, 1921; the original alignment of 125th Street became known as LaSalle Street. The station was also renamed 125th Street in 1921, following a request from the Harlem Board of Commerce. A mezzanine below the tracks opened at the station on September 26, 1931, with three new escalators and a new staircase to and from the street. The span of escalator service was extended from 1 a.m. to 2 a.m. on November 2, 1931.

The city government took over the IRT's operations on June 12, 1940. Platforms at IRT Broadway–Seventh Avenue Line stations between 103rd Street and 238th Street, including those at 125th Street, were lengthened to 514 feet (157 m) in 1948, allowing full ten-car express trains to stop at these stations. A contract for the platform extensions at 125th Street and five other stations on the line was awarded to the Rao Electrical Equipment Company and the Kaplan Electric Company in June 1946. The platform extensions at these stations were opened in stages. The platform extensions at 125th Street opened on June 11, 1948. Simultaneously, the IRT routes were given numbered designations with the introduction of "R-type" rolling stock, which contained rollsigns with numbered designations for each service. The route to 242nd Street became known as the 1. In 1959, all 1 trains became local.

On November 24, 1981, the New York City Landmarks Preservation Commission (LPC) designated the Manhattan Valley Viaduct, including the 125th Street station, as a city landmark. The designation was contentious; the Jewish Theological Seminary argued against the designation because it would prevent the museum from erecting a new structure on or near the site. The New York City Board of Estimate, which had to ratify the landmark status, upheld the designation in April 1982. The viaduct and station were added to the National Register of Historic Places in 1983.

In April 1988, the New York City Transit Authority (NYCTA) unveiled plans to speed up service on the Broadway–Seventh Avenue Line through the implementation of a skip-stop service: the 9 train. As soon as the plan was announced, some local officials were opposed to the change. Initially, skip-stop service would have been operated north of 116th Street, with 1 trains skipping 125th Street, 157th Street, 207th Street, and 225th Street, and 9 trains skipping 145th Street, 181st Street, Dyckman Street, 215th Street and 238th Street. However, the plan was changed because riders did not want 125th Street to be a skip-stop station. When skip-stop service started in 1989, it was only implemented north of 137th Street–City College on weekdays, and 125th Street was served by both the 1 and the 9.

==== 21st century ====
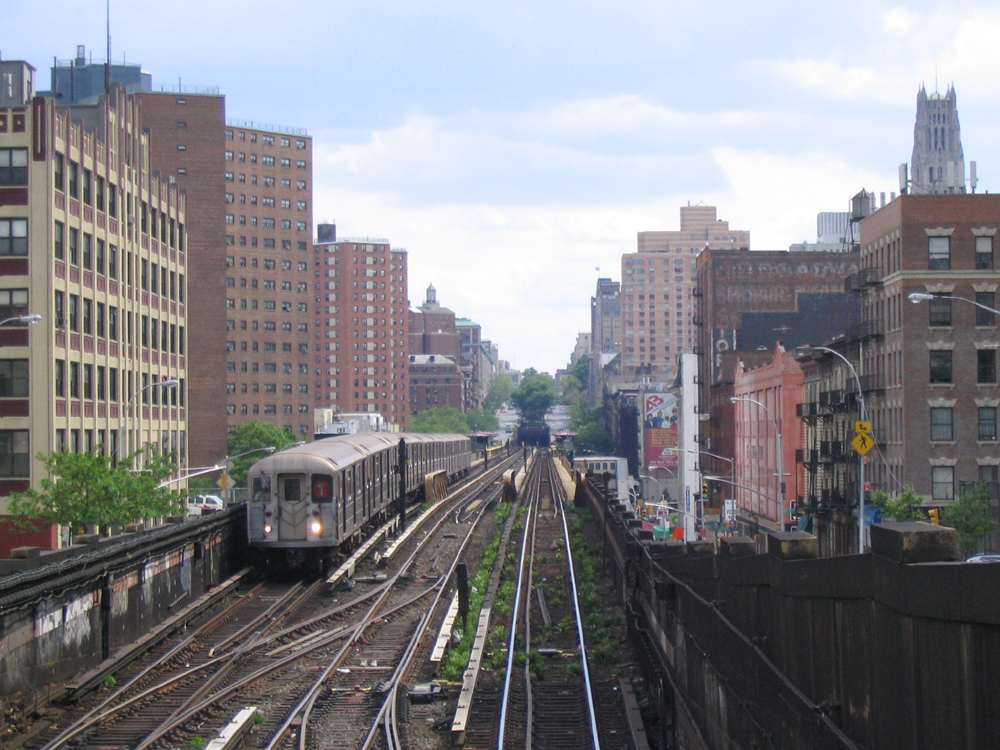
The tracks leading south to the station, which is visible behind (south of) the northbound 1 train

In June 2002, the Metropolitan Transportation Authority (MTA) announced that ten subway stations citywide, including 103rd Street, 110th Street, 116th Street, 125th Street, and 231st Street on the IRT Broadway–Seventh Avenue Line, would receive renovations. As part of the project, fare control areas would be redesigned, flooring, and electrical and communication systems would be upgraded, and new lighting, public address systems and stairways would be installed. In addition, since 110th Street, 116th Street, and 125th Street had landmark status, historical elements would be replaced or restored, including wall tiles. Work on the ten citywide renovation projects was estimated to cost almost $146 million, and was scheduled to start later that year, and be completed in April 2004, in time for the 100th anniversary of the station's opening, and the 250th anniversary of Columbia University.

Manhattan Community Board 9 was concerned about preserving the historic nature of the station during its renovation. Manhattan Community Board 7 got the MTA to agree to maintain the existing design of the wood paneling and windows in the station. The MTA was expected to decide whether preservation or speed would be prioritized in the station renovation projects by the end of the year. Columbia University provided funding to cover a portion of the cost of renovating the 125th Street station, as it did for the station renovations at 103rd Street, 110th Street, and 116th Street, and funded the substitution of the station's aluminum vents with glass windows to reflect the station's original design.

Between October 5 and November 17, 2003, the downtown platforms at 110th Street and 125th Street were closed to expedite work on their renovations. Skip-stop service ended on May 27, 2005, as a result of a decrease in the number of riders who benefited.

In February 2022, local officials requested that the MTA consider adding elevators to the 125th Street station, citing the fact that West Harlem was growing rapidly. At the time, there was only one fully accessible subway station on the Broadway–Seventh Avenue Line north of 96th Street; that station was 231st Street, several miles north in the Bronx. Despite calls from local residents, Columbia University, which was developing a 34-story building adjoining the station, originally refused to pay for any of the elevators; it instead offered only to fund the cost of escalators. In April 2026, Columbia agreed to pay $33 million for new escalators and a street-to-mezzanine elevator. Under this plan, the MTA would pay for two additional elevators from mezzanine to platform level. The MTA and Columbia University signed an agreement that May; the project would include the three elevators, new escalators, and repairs to the existing station. The southbound platform closed for renovations that October.

===== Possible Second Avenue Subway station =====
In January 2026, Governor Kathy Hochul announced that she would request funding to extend the Second Avenue Subway along 125th Street. Although Phase 2 of the line's construction was initially planned to extend only to 125th Street and Lexington Avenue, Hochul's proposal called for additional connections to existing stations at Lenox Avenue, St. Nicholas Avenue, and Broadway.

== Station layout ==
This station was part of the original subway. It has two side platforms and three tracks; the center track is not used in revenue service. The station is served by the 1 at all times and is between 137th Street to the north and 116th Street to the south. Both platforms have beige windscreens and red canopies. The windscreens have windows and green frames and outlines in the center that were installed in the station's 2003 renovation. On both ends of the platforms, which are not shaded by canopies, there are green, waist-high, ironwork fences.

=== IRT Broadway Line Viaduct ===
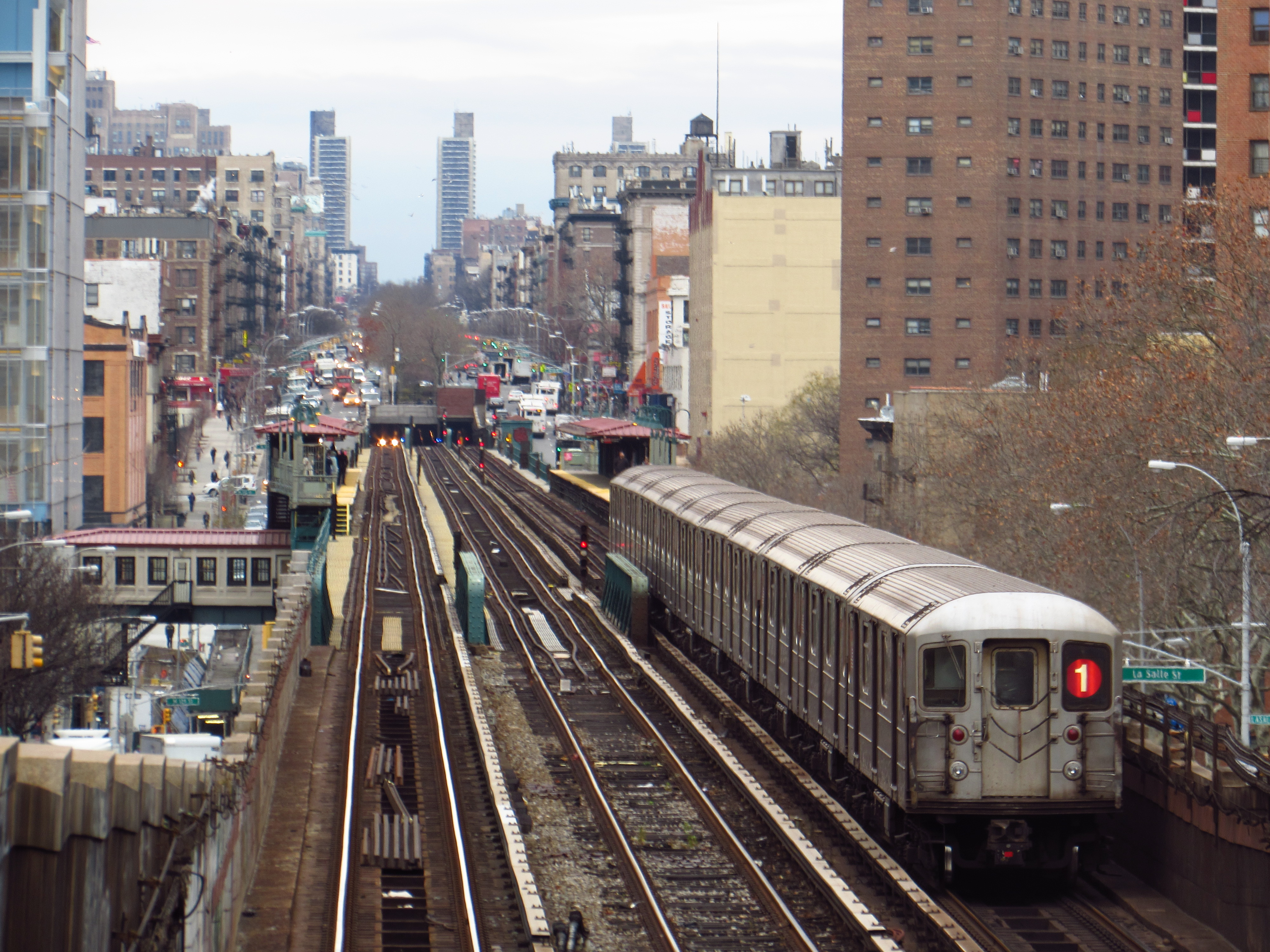
A northbound 1 train approaching the 125th Street station, as seen from the 122nd Street portal

The viaduct was originally known as Manhattan Valley Viaduct, a name it shared with the nearby pedestrian and street viaduct over Riverside Drive. The 125th Street station is the only station on the 2,174-foot-long (663 m) viaduct, which bridges Manhattanville from 122nd to 135th Streets. The viaduct allows the trains to remain relatively level and avoid steep grades while traversing the valley. An elevated steel structure with simple steel supports, as used in other parts of the IRT, was not feasible because of the oblique intersection of 125th Street (originally Manhattan Street) and Broadway. A streetcar ran along Manhattan Street, and the steel support columns would have conflicted with the trolley path. The choices were a realignment of the street, or a pillarless span over the intersection.

The steel arch across 125th Street is 168.5 feet (51.4 m) long and 54 feet (16 m) high, with foundations descending 30 feet (9.1 m) below street level. The arch measures 172 feet (52 m) long when measured between the skewbacks on either end. The arch is composed of three lattice-girder two-hinge ribs, whose centers are spaced 24.5 feet (7.5 m) apart. Each half rib supports six spandrel posts carrying the tracks. The chords of the ribs are 6 feet (1.8 m) apart with an H-section. Each rib was made in 14 sections of equal length.

Most of the remainder of the viaduct is a simple steel structure, similar to other early IRT lines. Each section measures 46 to 72 feet (14 to 22 m) long with transverse girders 31.33 feet (9.5 m) wide. Each track was proportioned for a dead load of 330 pounds per foot (490 kg/m) and a live load of 25,000 pounds (11,340 kg) per axle. The extreme ends of the viaduct contain plate girder bridges across LaSalle Street to the south and 133rd Street to the north. The span across LaSalle Street measures 86 feet (26 m) long, while that across 133rd Street measures 65 feet (20 m) long. When the viaduct was completed, it was painted dark green. The viaduct's southern portal runs from 122nd to LaSalle Streets while the northern portal runs from 133rd to 135th Streets. These portals are made of brick and stone and are topped by masonry parapets.

Architectural critic Montgomery Schuyler praised the IRT viaduct above 125th Street as "strictly an example of engineering, in which architectural conventions are not recognized at all". Aside from a complaint that the vertical supports of the arch carried an aesthetic "awkwardness", Schuyler wrote that "it is all the better architecturally" for having been designed for utilitarian purposes. Architectural writers Norval White and Elliot Willensky wrote in the AIA Guide to New York City that the arch was "worthy of Eiffel", a reference to the lattice of the Eiffel Tower.

=== Exits ===
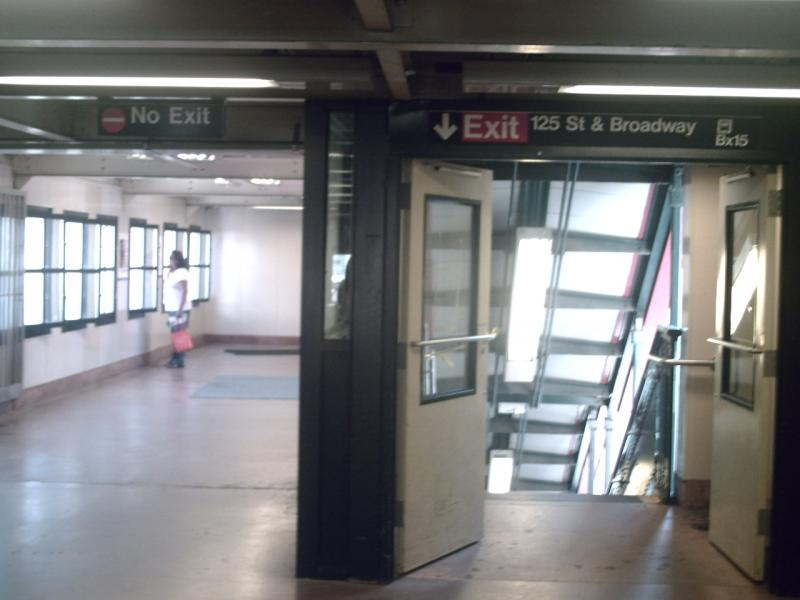
Staircase and passageway to escalator

The 125th Street station has a mezzanine fare control, where a turnstile bank provides access to and from the station. In the unpaid area, on the west side of the mezzanine, is a token booth and an enclosed passageway, which leads to two escalators going down to the west side of Broadway. The escalators go in opposite directions: one leads north to 125th Street while the other leads south to Tiemann Place. On the east side of the station house, another enclosed passageway leads to an escalator facing south and going down to the southeast corner of Broadway and 125th Street. Adjacent to this passageway is an L-shaped staircase with its upper half directly above Broadway and the lower half beneath the enclosed escalator going to the same corner of the intersection. When the station opened, drawings show that there were escalators descending to the median of Broadway.

== See also ==
- List of New York City Designated Landmarks in Manhattan above 110th Street
- National Register of Historic Places listings in Manhattan above 110th Street
