= 116th Street–Columbia University station =

New York City Subway station in Manhattan

116 Street–Columbia University
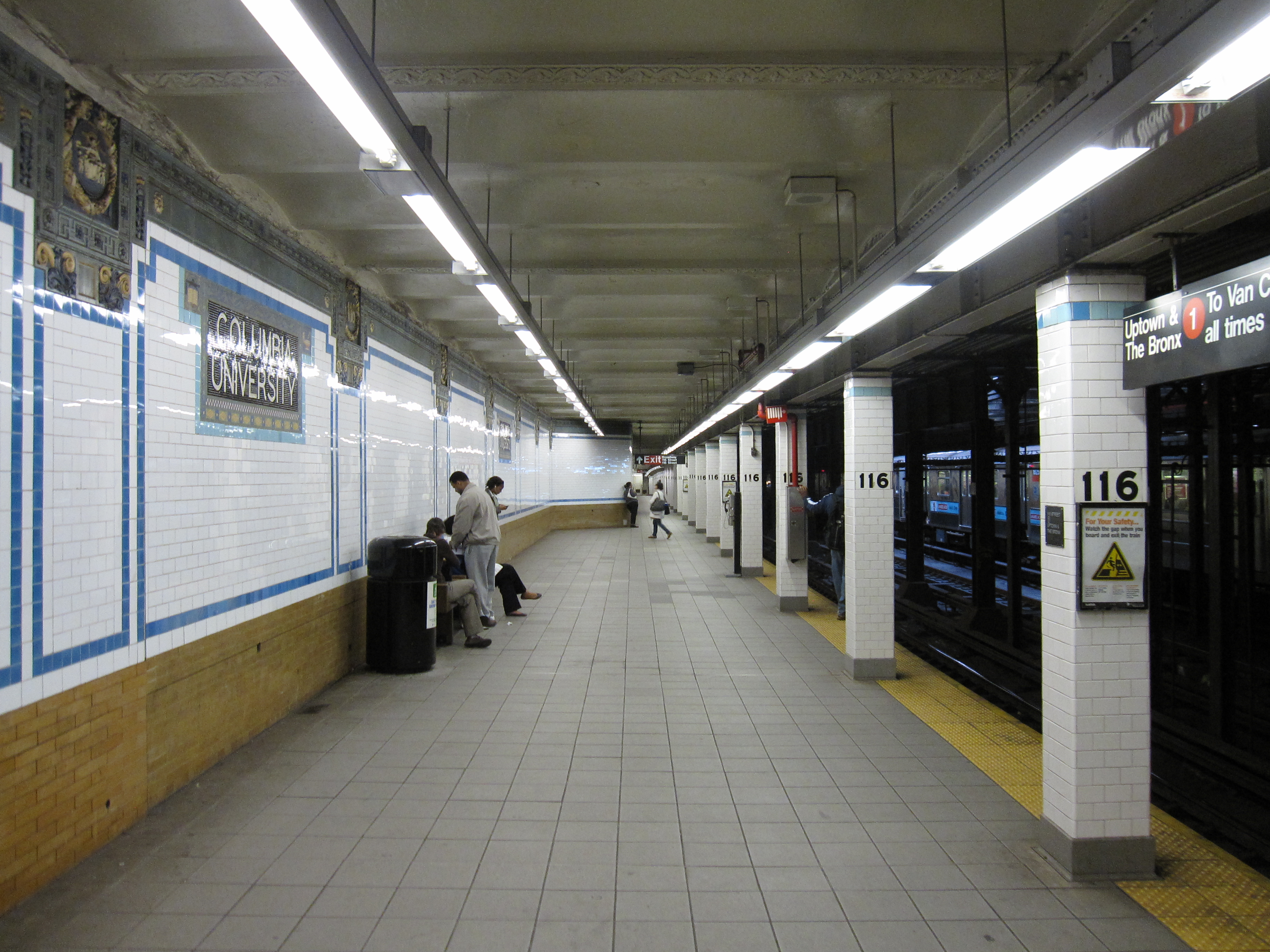
- Northbound platform

Station statistics
- Address: West 116th Street & Broadway; New York, New York
- Borough: Manhattan
- Locale: Morningside Heights
- Coordinates: 40°48′29″N 73°57′50″W
- Division: A (IRT)
- Line: IRT Broadway–Seventh Avenue Line
- Services: 1 (all times)
- Transit: NYCT Bus: M4, M60 SBS, M104; Columbia Transportation: all routes except Fort Lee Shuttle. Barnard Public Safety Shuttle
- Structure: Underground
- Platforms: 2 side platforms
- Tracks: 3 (2 in regular service)

Other information
- Opened: October 27, 1904; 122 years ago

Traffic
- 2025: 3,435,034 ▲3.2%
- Rank: 108 out of 423
Services
Preceding station	New York City Subway	Following station
125th Street toward Van Cortlandt Park–242nd Street	Local	Cathedral Parkway–110th Street toward South Ferry
Location
Location within New York City Subway
Location within New York City
Location within New York
Track layout
Street map
Station service legend
Symbol	Description
Stops all times	Stops all times
- 116th Street–Columbia University Subway Station (IRT)
- U.S. National Register of Historic Places
- New York City Landmark
- MPS: New York City Subway System MPS
- NRHP reference No.: 04001020
- NYCL No.: 1096

Significant dates
- Added to NRHP: September 17, 2004
- Designated NYCL: October 23, 1979

The 116th Street–Columbia University station is a local station on the IRT Broadway–Seventh Avenue Line of the New York City Subway. It is located at the intersection of Broadway and 116th Street in the Morningside Heights neighborhood of Manhattan, just outside the west gate to the main campus of Columbia University and the southeast corner of the Barnard College campus. The station is served by the 1 train at all times.

The 116th Street station was constructed for the Interborough Rapid Transit Company (IRT) as part of the city's first subway line, which was approved in 1900. Construction of the line segment that includes 116th Street began on June 18 of the same year. The station opened on October 27, 1904, as one of the original 28 stations of the New York City Subway. The station's platforms were lengthened in 1948 to accommodate ten-car trains, the station's median entrance was replaced in the 1960s, and the station was renovated in the 2000s.

The 116th Street station contains two side platforms and three tracks; the center track is not used in regular service. The station was built with tile and mosaic decorations. The mezzanine above the platforms contains exits to 116th Street and Broadway, and the northbound platform contains an additional exit to 115th Street. The original section of the station is a New York City designated landmark and listed on the National Register of Historic Places.

== History ==
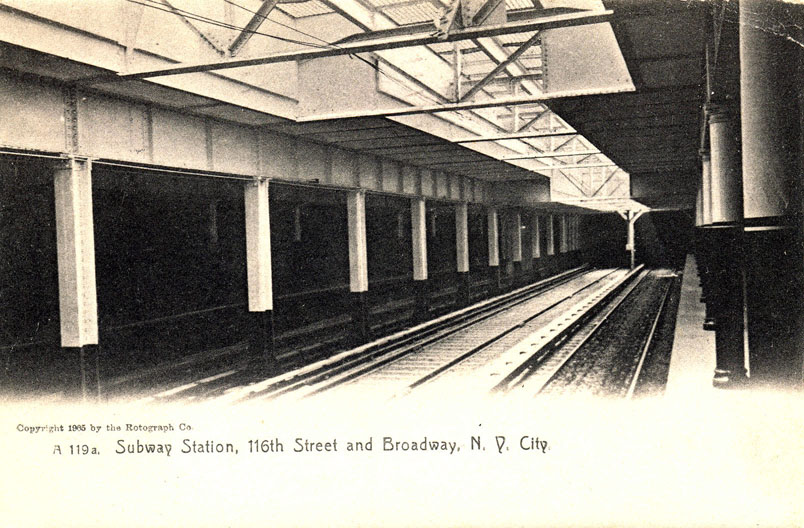
A view of the station in 1905

=== Construction and opening ===
Planning for a subway line in New York City dates to 1864, but development of what became the city's first subway line did not start until 1894, when the New York State Legislature passed the Rapid Transit Act. The subway plans were drawn up by a team of engineers led by William Barclay Parsons, the Rapid Transit Commission's chief engineer. It called for a subway line from New York City Hall in lower Manhattan to the Upper West Side, where two branches would lead north into the Bronx. A plan was formally adopted in 1897, and all legal conflicts over the route alignment were resolved near the end of 1899.

The Rapid Transit Construction Company, organized by John B. McDonald and funded by August Belmont Jr., signed the initial Contract 1 with the Rapid Transit Commission in February 1900, under which it would construct the subway and maintain a 50-year operating lease from the opening of the line. In 1901, the firm of Heins & LaFarge was hired to design the underground stations. Belmont incorporated the Interborough Rapid Transit Company (IRT) in April 1902 to operate the subway.

The 116th Street station was constructed as part of the IRT's West Side Line (now the Broadway–Seventh Avenue Line) from 104th Street to 125th Street, for which construction began on June 18, 1900. The section of the West Side Line around this station was originally planned as a two-track line, but in early 1901, was changed to a three-track structure to permit train storage in the center track. Construction on the section between 104th Street and 125th Street had already begun prior to the design change, requiring that a portion of the work be undone. A third track was added directly north of 96th Street, immediately east of the originally planned two tracks. By late 1903, the subway was nearly complete, but the IRT Powerhouse and the system's electrical substations were still under construction, delaying the system's opening. As late as October 26, 1904, the day before the subway was scheduled to open, the walls and ceilings were incomplete.

The 116th Street station opened on October 27, 1904, as one of the original 28 stations of the New York City Subway from City Hall to 145th Street on the West Side Branch. The opening of the first subway line, and particularly the 116th Street station, helped contribute to the development of Morningside Heights and Harlem.

=== Service changes and station renovations ===
==== 20th century ====
After the first subway line was completed in 1908, the station was served by West Side local and express trains. Express trains began at South Ferry in Manhattan or Atlantic Avenue in Brooklyn, and ended at 242nd Street in the Bronx. Local trains ran from City Hall to 242nd Street during rush hours, continuing south from City Hall to South Ferry at other times. In 1918, the Broadway–Seventh Avenue Line opened south of Times Square–42nd Street, and the original line was divided into an H-shaped system. The original subway north of Times Square thus became part of the Broadway–Seventh Avenue Line. Local trains were sent to South Ferry, while express trains used the new Clark Street Tunnel to Brooklyn.

To address overcrowding, in 1909, the New York Public Service Commission proposed lengthening the platforms at stations along the original IRT subway. As part of a modification to the IRT's construction contracts made on January 18, 1910, the company was to lengthen station platforms to accommodate ten-car express and six-car local trains. In addition to $1.5 million (equivalent to $51.8 million in 2025) spent on platform lengthening, $500,000 (equivalent to $17.3 million in 2025) was spent on building additional entrances and exits. It was anticipated that these improvements would increase capacity by 25 percent. The northbound platform at the 116th Street station was extended 130 feet (40 m) to the south, while the southbound platform was not lengthened. Six-car local trains began operating in October 1910, and ten-car express trains began running on the West Side Line on January 24, 1911. Subsequently, the station could accommodate six-car local trains, but ten-car trains could not open some of their doors. In conjunction with the platform lengthening, a new entrance was constructed to the northbound platform in 1912. An entrance kiosk for the new staircase was taken from the 23rd Street and Fourth Avenue station and was installed in July 1913.

The city government took over the IRT's operations on June 12, 1940. Platforms at IRT Broadway–Seventh Avenue Line stations between 103rd Street and 238th Street, including those at 116th Street, were lengthened to 514 feet (157 m) between 1946 and 1948, allowing full ten-car express trains to stop at these stations. A contract for the platform extensions at 116th Street and eight other stations on the line was awarded to Spencer, White & Prentis Inc. in October 1946, with an estimated cost of $3.891 million. The platform extensions at these stations were opened in stages. On April 6, 1948, the platform extension at 116th Street opened. Simultaneously, the IRT routes were given numbered designations with the introduction of "R-type" rolling stock, which contained rollsigns with numbered designations for each service. The route to 242nd Street became known as the 1. In 1959, all 1 trains became local.

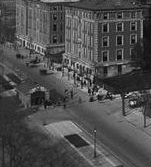
The above-ground 116th Street entrance, 1910

Columbia University first requested the demolition of the station's original entrance in Broadway's median in 1954, ahead of the Columbia University Bicentennial. The university brought up the issue again at a meeting of the New York City Board of Estimate in 1963, after a student was killed while crossing the street. The kiosk was seen as a safety hazard, with two deaths and several accidents occurring at the kiosk from 1962 to 1964. Sixty-eight hundred students and faculty members signed a petition to remove the kiosk in February 1964. On March 13, 1964, the New York City Board of Estimate voted to allocate $600,000 (equivalent to $6,228,541 in 2025) to demolish the entrance and replace it with two new sidewalk entrances as part of the 1964–1965 City budget. The New York City Department of Highways had requested that funds be allocated to this project at the request of Columbia University. The New York City Transit Authority had not yet drawn up plans for the project. Bids for the kiosk's demolition were initially scheduled to be solicited in July 1964. That October, a NYCTA spokesperson announced that the demolition of the entrance would be delayed until the following spring. Work on the project had been expected to commence in December 1964. The NYCTA was expected to complete the design of the project in early 1965, after which the project could be put out for bids.

On November 2, 1966, the New York City Planning Commission voted to grant an additional $300,000 (equivalent to $2,976,923 in 2025) for the project after the cost of the project was revised. The money for the project was reallocated within the Highway Department's budget. It was estimated that following necessary approvals from the New York City Board of Estimate, bids on the project would be let on December 16, and work on the project would begin by the end of January 1967. Work on the project was set to be done in 22 months. In 1965, Columbia University and Barnard College had announced that they would each spend $5,000 (equivalent to $51,082 in 2025) to decorate the new entrances to fit in with their campuses. Work on the project was completed in 1968.

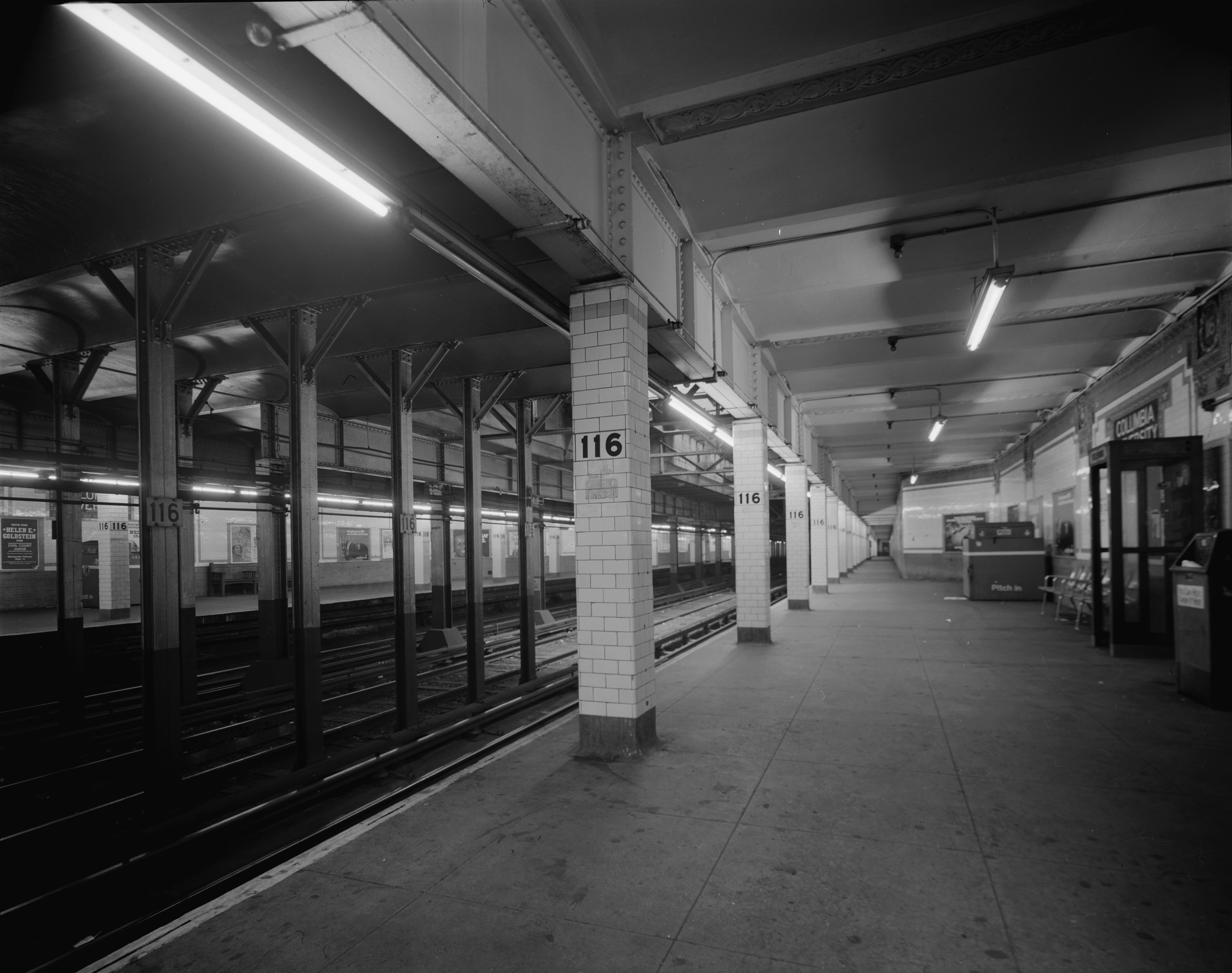
The station's downtown platform in 1978

In 1979, the New York City Landmarks Preservation Commission designated the space within the boundaries of the original station, excluding expansions made after 1904, as a city landmark. The station was designated along with eleven others on the original IRT. In April 1988, the NYCTA unveiled plans to speed up service on the Broadway–Seventh Avenue Line through the implementation of a skip-stop service: the 9 train. When skip-stop service began on August 21, 1989, it was only implemented north of 137th Street–City College on weekdays, and 116th Street was served by both the 1 and the 9.

In October 1988, the Metropolitan Transportation Authority (MTA) announced that the newsstand on the station's downtown platform would be removed as part of a citywide program to beautify stations and improve passenger flow. The agency began this program in late 1987. The owner of the newsstand was unsure of whether he would rebuild the stand as the cost of rebuilding it might have outweighed the benefits of reopening it. This newsstand was chosen for rebuilding as it was only 12 feet (3.7 m) away from a staircase.

==== 21st century ====
In June 2002, the MTA announced that ten subway stations citywide, including 103rd Street, 110th Street, 116th Street, 125th Street, and 231st Street on the IRT Broadway–Seventh Avenue Line, would receive renovations. As part of the project, fare control areas would be redesigned, flooring, and electrical and communication systems would be upgraded, and new lighting, public address systems and stairways would be installed. In addition, since 110th Street, 116th Street, and 125th Street had landmark status, historical elements would be replaced or restored, including wall tiles. At the ends of the station platforms at 103rd Street, 110th Street, and 116th Street, a small section of station wall, which would look identical to the existing station walls, would be added to provide space for scrubber rooms. Work on the ten citywide renovation projects was estimated to cost almost $146 million, and was scheduled to start later that year, and be completed in April 2004, in time for the 100th anniversary of the station's opening, and the 250th anniversary of Columbia University.

Columbia University contributed $1 million (equivalent to $1,750,181 in 2025) to the station renovation project after the MTA said it would have to put off the renovation projects in Manhattan due to funding issues. The university had also reached agreements to cover part of the costs of the station renovations at 103rd Street, 110th Street, and 125th Street. As a condition of the funding allocation for the station renovation, the university wanted work on the project to be expedited. Residents of Morningside Heights approved of the renovation plans, but were concerned that the expedited repairs would come at the cost of damaging the stations' historic elements. The MTA was expected to decide whether preservation or speed would be prioritized in the station renovation projects by the end of 2002.

At the 110th Street and 116th Street stations, local community activists opposed artwork that was planned to be commissioned through the MTA's Arts for Transit program. Though the proposed artwork was intended as a homage to the stations' history, the activists believed the art would damage the decorative tiling that dated from the stations' opening, and that the artwork would damage the landmark interiors of the stations. The MTA had planned to install a small bronze subway track and train to be inlaid within the station walls surrounded by sepia-toned photographs of the neighborhood at 116th Street. In December 2002, Manhattan Community Board 7 voted in favor of the plan to include artwork from the MTA's Arts for Transit program at the 103rd Street station, which was not landmarked. Community Board 7 voted against the plan to include new artwork at the landmarked 110th Street and 116th Street stations, and the MTA dropped plans for the artwork at these stations. The station renovation project at 116th Street began in January 2003. From May 31 to July 12, 2003, the uptown platforms at the 116th Street and 103rd Street stations were closed at all times for their renovations. The original interiors were listed on the National Register of Historic Places in 2004. Skip-stop service ended on May 27, 2005, as a result of a decrease in the number of riders who benefited.

== Station layout ==
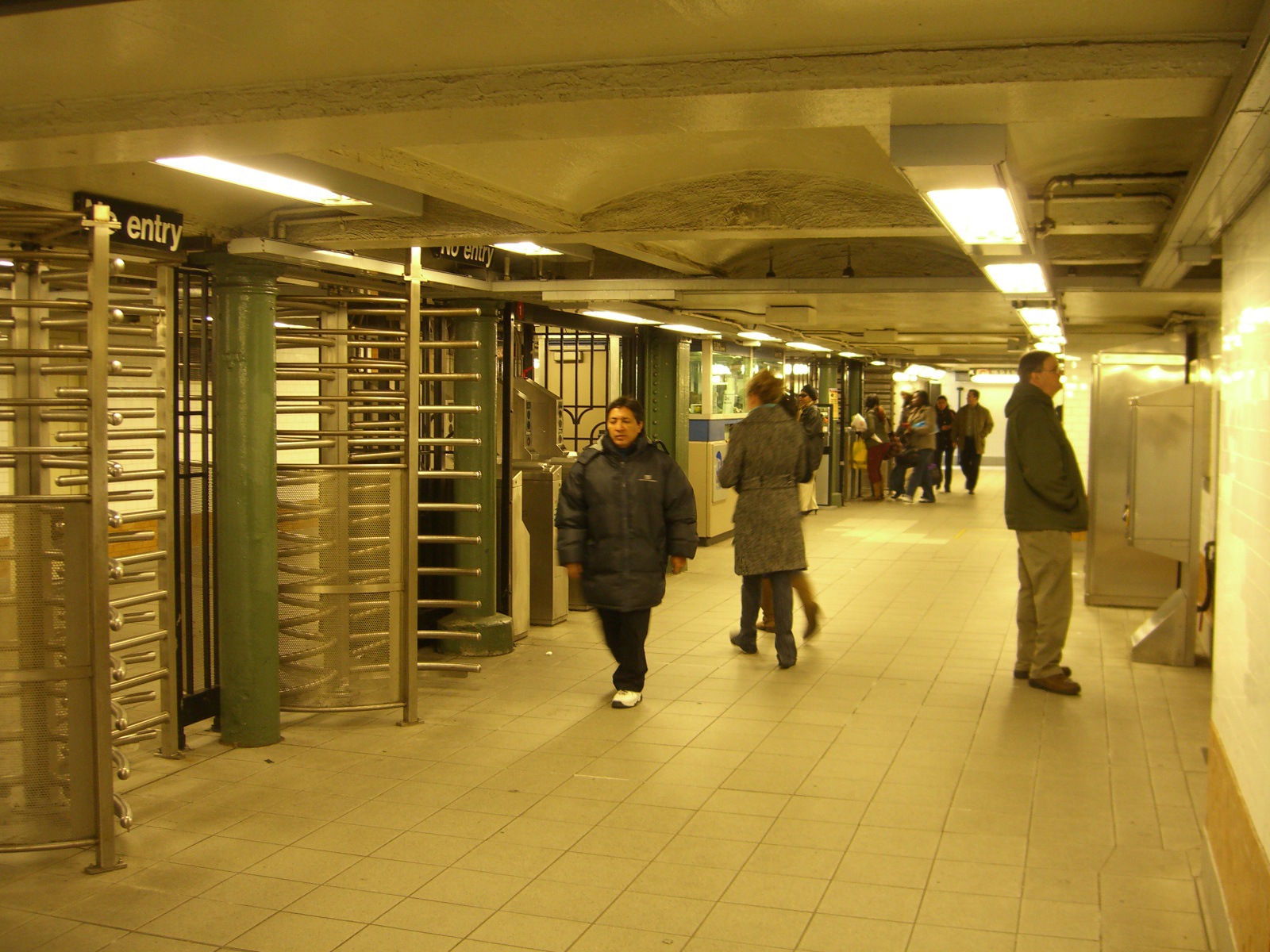
Station mezzanine

This station has two side platforms and three tracks, the center one being an unused express track. The station is served by the 1 at all times and is between 125th Street to the north and 110th Street to the south. The platforms were originally 350 feet (110 m) long, like at other stations north of 96th Street, but as a result of the 1948 platform extension, became 520 feet (160 m) long. The platform extensions are at the southern ends of the original platforms.

Two staircases from each platform lead to a mezzanine above the platforms, which contains the fare control area. Outside fare control, the mezzanine connects to stairways on either side of Broadway.

The southbound platform contains an artwork by Michelle Greene, Railrider's Throne. The artwork, installed in 1991 as part of the MTA Arts for Transit program, was originally intended to be temporary. It consists of a large steel chair. Greene said she had created the artwork because she "wanted to create a whimsical environment that allows the commuter to feel special as opposed to alienated".

The southbound local track is technically known as BB1 while the northbound one is BB4; the BB designation is used for chaining purposes along the Broadway–Seventh Avenue Line from 96th Street to 242nd Street. Although it cannot be accessed at 116th Street–Columbia University, the center track is designated as M. These designations are rarely, if ever, used in ordinary conversation.

=== Design ===
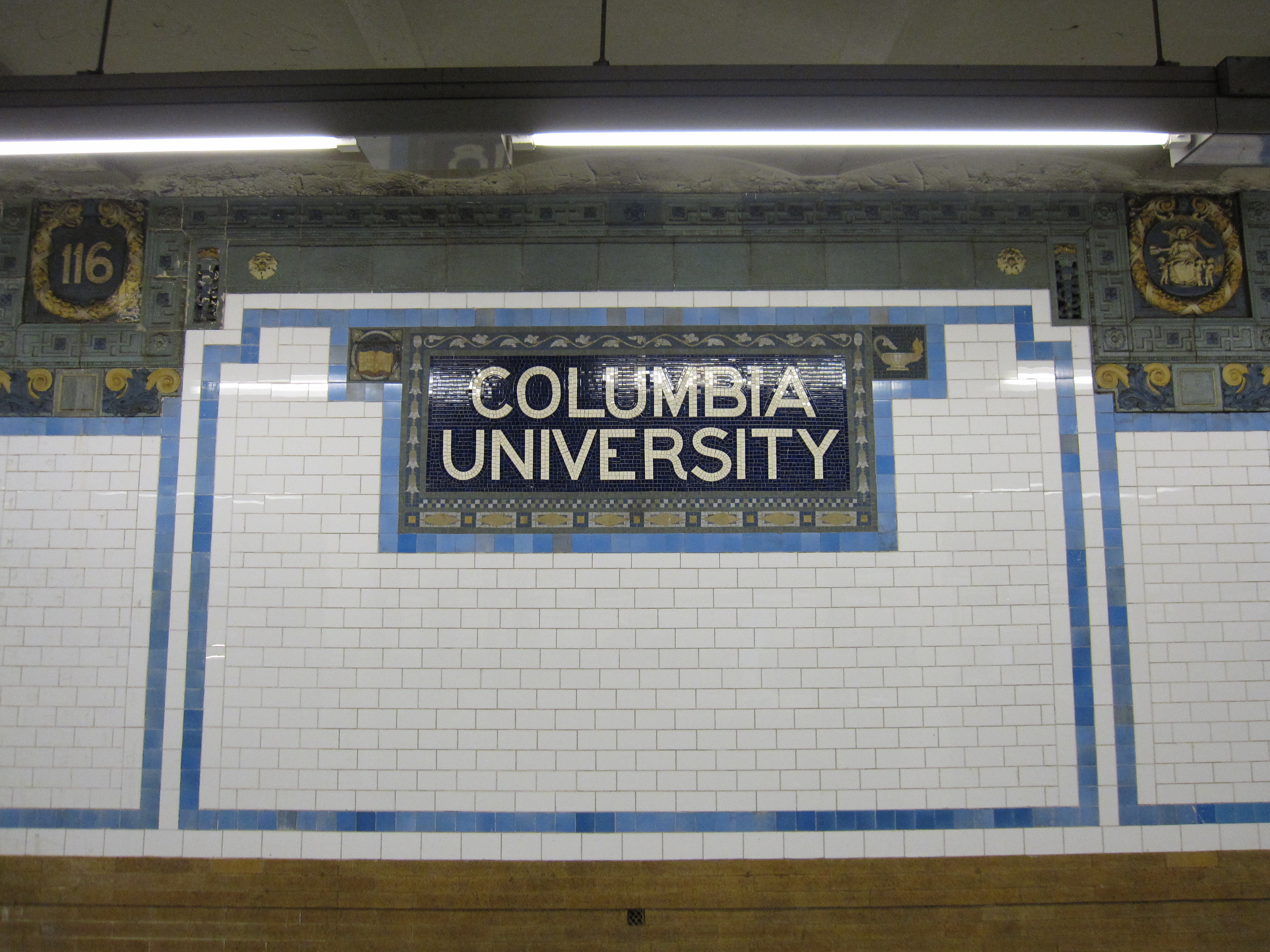
Name identification tablet

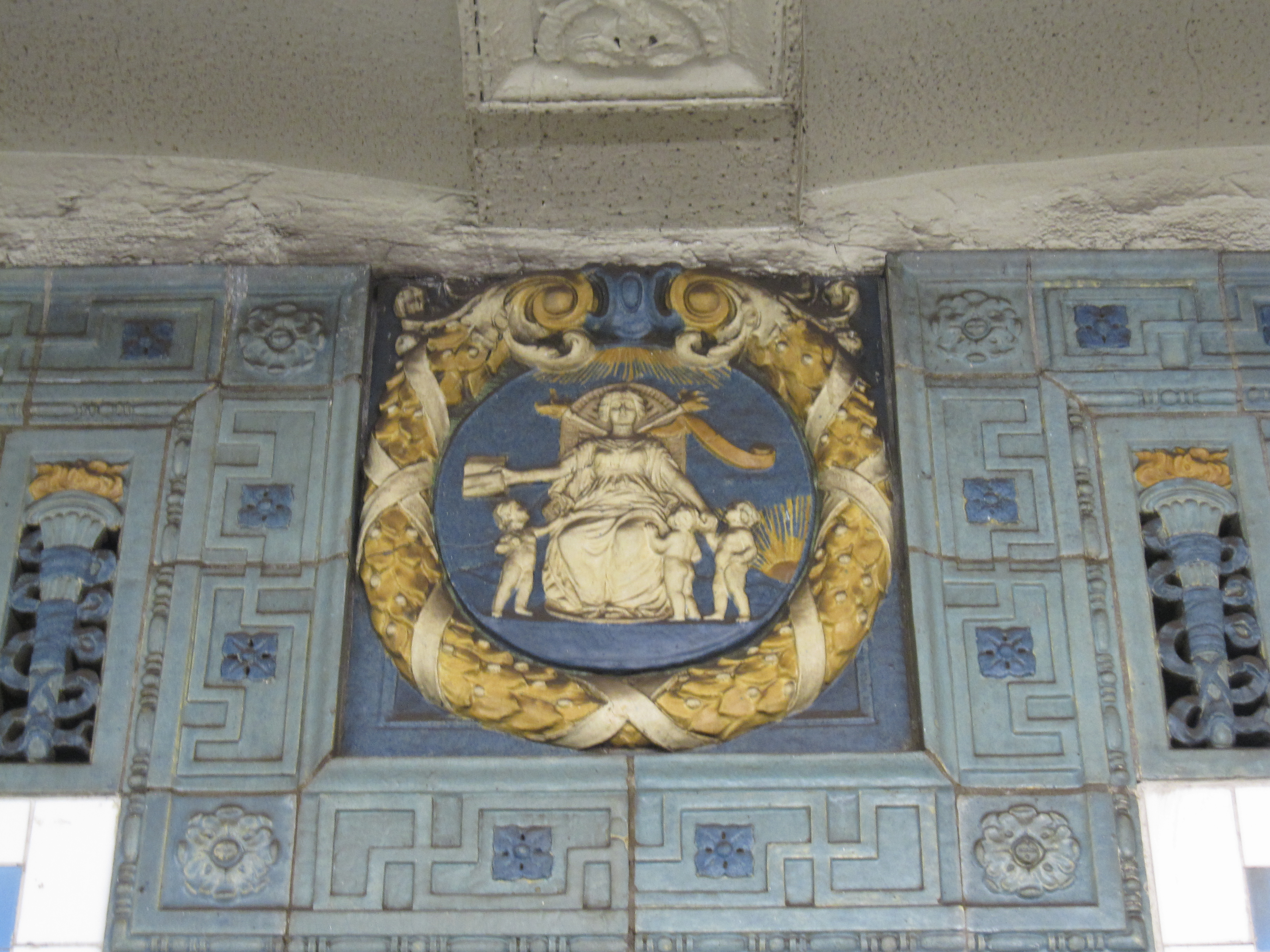
Faience plaque of the seal of Columbia University

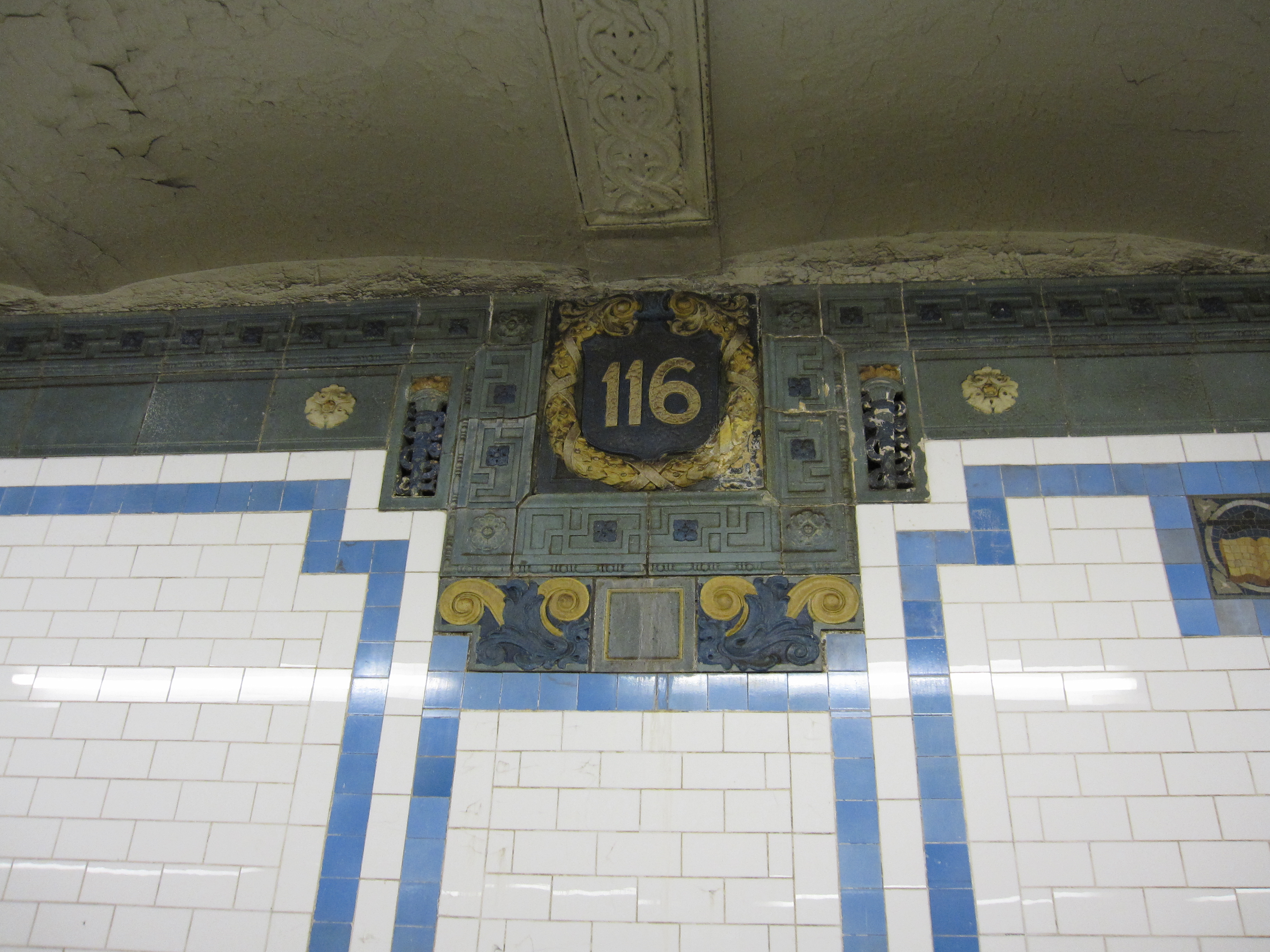
Faience plaque of the number 116

As with other stations built as part of the original IRT, the station was constructed using a cut-and-cover method. The tunnel is covered by a U-shaped trough that contains utility pipes and wires. This trough contains a foundation of concrete no less than 4 inches (100 mm) thick. Each platform consists of 3-inch-thick (7.6 cm) concrete slabs, beneath which are drainage basins. The original platforms contain circular, cast-iron Doric-style columns spaced every 15 feet (4.6 m), while the platform extensions contain I-beam columns. Additional columns between the tracks, spaced every 5 feet (1.5 m), support the jack-arched concrete station roofs. There is a 1-inch (25 mm) gap between the trough wall and the platform walls, which are made of 4-inch (100 mm)-thick brick covered over by a tiled finish. The ceiling is about 8 feet (2.4 m) above platform level in the southern part of the station, but is higher above the northern part, reaching 12 to 15 feet (3.7 to 4.6 m) above the platform.

The walls along the platforms consist of a buff-colored brick wainscoting on the lowest part of the wall, and white glass tiles above. The platform walls are divided at 15-foot (4.6 m) intervals by blue tile pilasters, or vertical bands. The pilasters are topped by alternating blue-and-cream faience plaques of the number "116" and the Columbia University seal; both of these motifs are surrounded by faience wreaths. The seal shows a seated woman with a book of knowledge in her hand and three children standing near her feet. A blue-and-green cornice, made of faience, runs atop the wall and around the mosaic tablets. Mosaic wall tablets with the name "Columbia University" are installed along the platform walls. The mosaic tiles at all original IRT stations were manufactured by the American Encaustic Tile Company, which subcontracted the installations at each station. The decorative work was performed by tile contractor John H. Parry and faience contractor Grueby Faience Company.

=== Entrances and exits ===
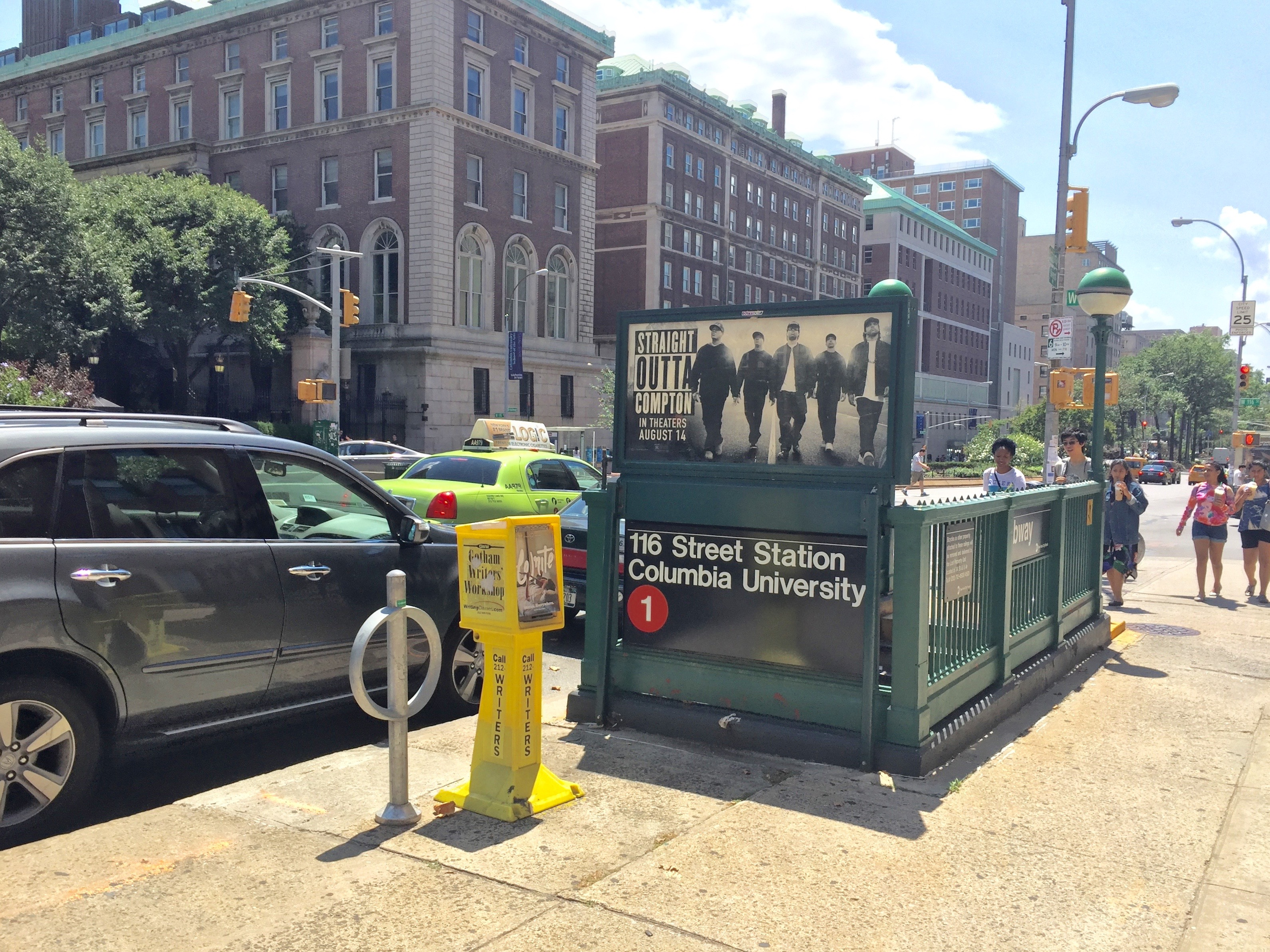
Northwestern corner stairs

The station has four entrance/exit stairs that serve both platforms. One pair ascends to the northwest corner of Broadway and 116th Street, while the other pair goes to the northeast corner of the same intersection. There is also an exit-only staircase near the southern end of the northbound platform that leads to the east side of Broadway at 115th Street, outside the Alfred Lerner Hall.

There was a station house in the median of Broadway, just north of 116th Street, which was designed by Heins & LaFarge and dated to the station's opening in 1904. It was built as one of several station houses on the original IRT; similar station houses were built at Atlantic Avenue, Bowling Green, Mott Avenue, 72nd Street, and 103rd Street. The station house, which was identical to the one at 103rd Street, occupied an area of 50 by 20 feet (15.2 by 6.1 m). The one-story station house contained exterior walls made of buff brick, with a foundation made of granite blocks. A limestone string course ran atop the exterior wall. At the corners of the station house were limestone quoins, which supported a copper-and-terracotta gable roof facing west and east. The ridge of the station house's roof was a skylight made of glass and metal. The doorways were centrally located on the north and south walls of the control house, topped by terracotta finials and a rounded gable. There were terracotta crosses on each rounded gable with the number "116" embossed onto them. Above the doorway was a pediment and an arched window made of glass and wrought iron. The control house was closed and demolished in 1968.
