= 103rd Street station (IRT Broadway–Seventh Avenue Line) =

New York City Subway station in Manhattan

103 Street
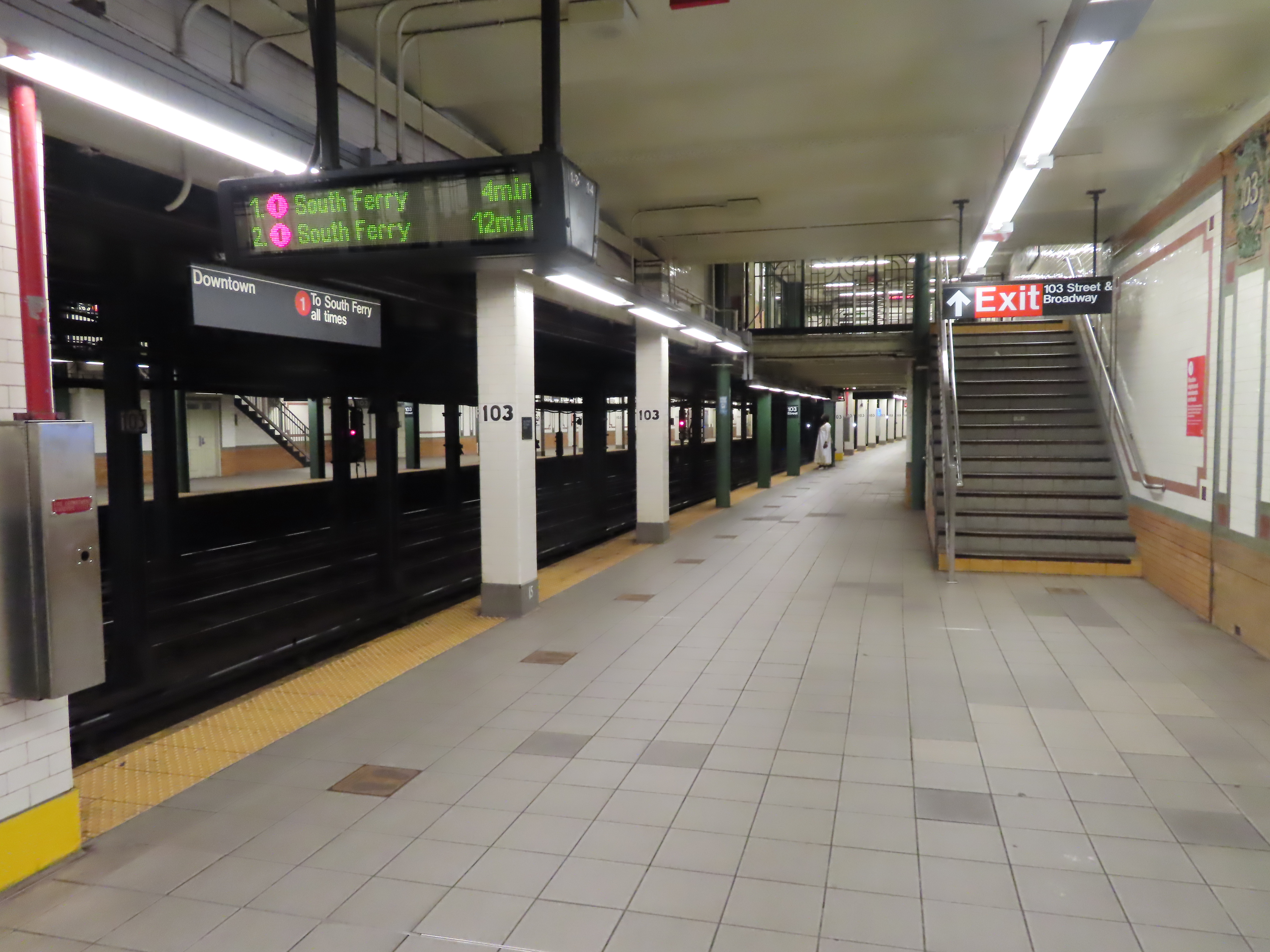
- The station's southbound platform in 2021

Station statistics
- Address: West 103rd Street & Broadway; New York, New York
- Borough: Manhattan
- Locale: Upper West Side, Manhattan Valley
- Coordinates: 40.799419°N 73.968158°W
- Division: A (IRT)
- Line: IRT Broadway–Seventh Avenue Line
- Services: 1 (all times)
- Transit: NYCT Bus: M104
- Structure: Underground
- Platforms: 2 side platforms
- Tracks: 3 (2 in regular service)

Other information
- Opened: October 27, 1904; 122 years ago

Traffic
- 2025: 2,987,967 ▲7.3%
- Rank: 126 out of 423
Services
Preceding station	New York City Subway	Following station
Cathedral Parkway–110th Street toward Van Cortlandt Park–242nd Street	Local	96th Street toward South Ferry
Location
Location within New York City Subway
Location within New York City
Location within New York
Track layout
Street map
Station service legend
Symbol	Description
Stops all times	Stops all times

The 103rd Street station is a local station on the IRT Broadway–Seventh Avenue Line of the New York City Subway. Located at the intersection of 103rd Street and Broadway on the Upper West Side of Manhattan, it is served by the 1 train at all times.

The 103rd Street station was constructed for the Interborough Rapid Transit Company (IRT) as part of the city's first subway line, which was approved in 1900. Construction of the line segment that includes 103rd Street began on August 22 of the same year. The station opened on October 27, 1904, as one of the original 28 stations of the New York City Subway. The station's platforms were lengthened in 1948, and the station was renovated in the 2000s. The 103rd Street station contains two side platforms and three tracks; the center track is not used in regular service. The station was built with tile and mosaic decorations. The mezzanine above the platforms contains exits to 103rd Street and Broadway.

== History ==
=== Construction and opening ===
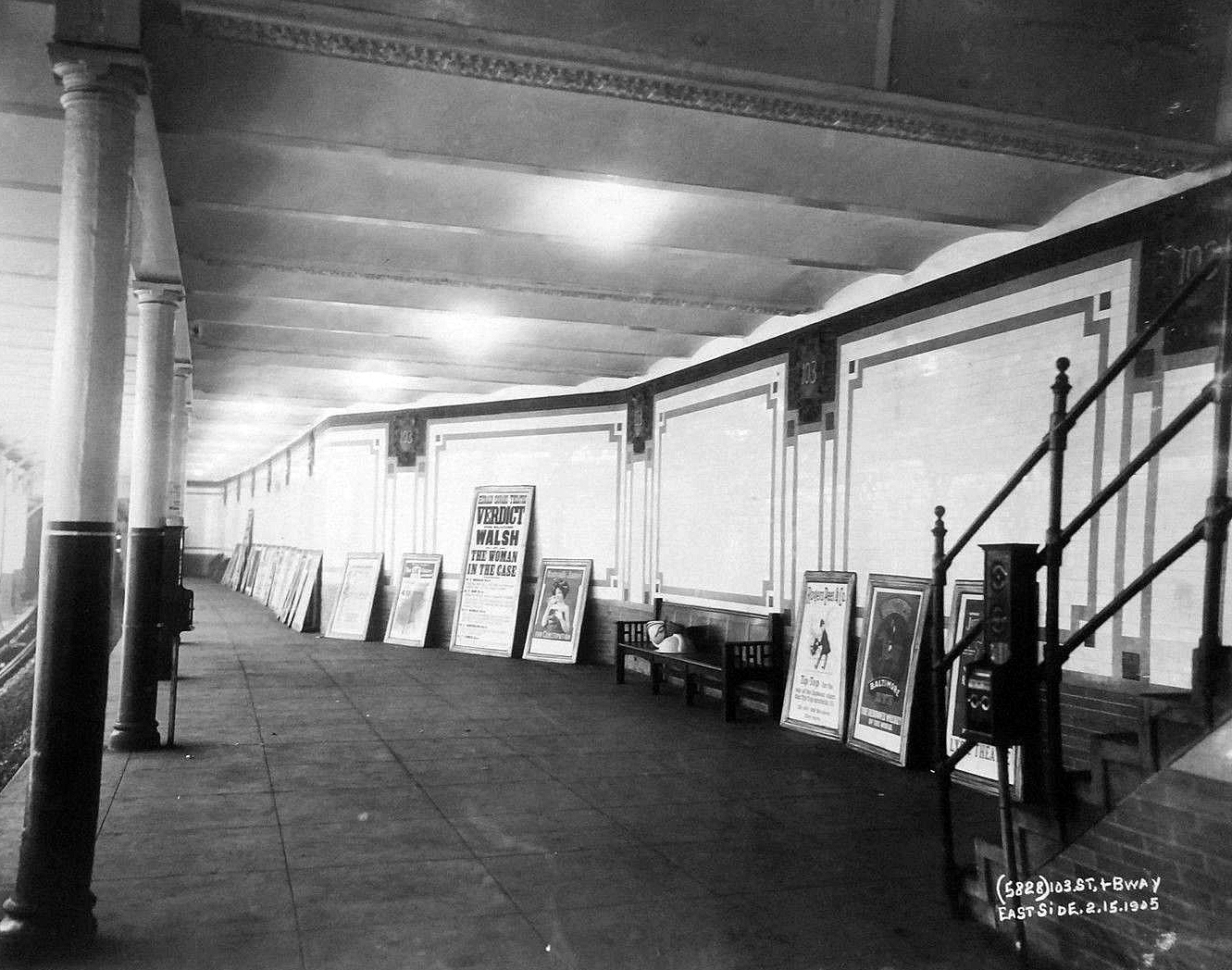
The northbound platform of the 103rd Street station in 1905

Planning for a subway line in New York City dates to 1864, but development of what became the city's first subway line did not start until 1894, when the New York State Legislature passed the Rapid Transit Act. The subway plans were drawn up by a team of engineers led by William Barclay Parsons, the Rapid Transit Commission's chief engineer. It called for a subway line from New York City Hall in lower Manhattan to the Upper West Side, where two branches would lead north into the Bronx. A plan was formally adopted in 1897, and all legal conflicts over the route alignment were resolved near the end of 1899.

The Rapid Transit Construction Company, organized by John B. McDonald and funded by August Belmont Jr., signed the initial Contract 1 with the Rapid Transit Commission in February 1900, under which it would construct the subway and maintain a 50-year operating lease from the opening of the line. In 1901, the firm of Heins & LaFarge was hired to design the underground stations. Belmont incorporated the Interborough Rapid Transit Company (IRT) in April 1902 to operate the subway.

The 103rd Street station was constructed as part of the IRT's West Side Line (now the Broadway–Seventh Avenue Line). It was built along with the section of line from 82nd Street to 104th Street, for which construction began on August 22, 1900. The East Side Branch (now Lenox Avenue Line) split off directly to the south. The section of the West Side Line around this station was originally planned as a two-track line, but in early 1901, was changed to a three-track structure to permit train storage in the center track. A third track was added directly north of 96th Street, immediately east of the originally planned two tracks. By late 1903, the subway was nearly complete, but the IRT Powerhouse and the system's electrical substations were still under construction, delaying the system's opening. As late as October 26, 1904, the day before the subway was scheduled to open, the walls still had "many rough spots" according to The New York Times.

The 103rd Street station opened on October 27, 1904, as one of the original 28 stations of the New York City Subway from City Hall to 145th Street on the West Side Branch. The opening of the first subway line helped contribute to the development of Morningside Heights and Harlem. The Hotel Marseilles apartment building, across the street from one of the station's exits, was built in anticipation of the 103rd Street station's opening.

=== Service changes and station renovations ===
==== 20th century ====
After the first subway line was completed in 1908, the station was served by West Side local and express trains. Express trains began at South Ferry in Manhattan or Atlantic Avenue in Brooklyn, and ended at 242nd Street in the Bronx. Local trains ran from City Hall to 242nd Street during rush hours, continuing south from City Hall to South Ferry at other times. In 1918, the Broadway–Seventh Avenue Line opened south of Times Square–42nd Street, and the original line was divided into an H-shaped system. The original subway north of Times Square thus became part of the Broadway–Seventh Avenue Line. Local trains were sent to South Ferry, while express trains used the new Clark Street Tunnel to Brooklyn.

To address overcrowding, in 1909, the New York Public Service Commission proposed lengthening the platforms at stations along the original IRT subway. As part of a modification to the IRT's construction contracts made on January 18, 1910, the company was to lengthen station platforms to accommodate ten-car express and six-car local trains. In addition to $1.5 million (equivalent to $51.8 million in 2025) spent on platform lengthening, $500,000 (equivalent to $17.3 million in 2025) was spent on building additional entrances and exits. It was anticipated that these improvements would increase capacity by 25 percent.

On September 30, 1910, the New York Public Service Commission approved a modification to Contract 1 to allow for the construction of additional entrances and exits at five stations, including 103rd Street and 110th Street on Broadway. Work was expected to be completed within a year of the date that permission was granted to do the work at these two stations. The northbound platform at the 103rd Street station was extended 125 feet (38 m) to the north, while the southbound platform was not lengthened. Six-car local trains began operating in October 1910, and ten-car express trains began running on the West Side Line on January 24, 1911. Subsequently, the station could accommodate six-car local trains, but ten-car trains could not open some of their doors.

In conjunction with the platform lengthening, a new entrance was installed at the southeast corner of 104th Street and Broadway; it was completed in March 1912. The kiosk for this entrance had previously been located at the southeast corner of Broadway and 42nd Street, serving the Times Square–42nd Street station, but it had been removed because 42nd Street was being widened. In 1920, an additional exit was constructed at 103rd Street in case of emergencies. In 1930, the kiosk for the entrance at the southeastern corner of 104th Street and Broadway was removed.

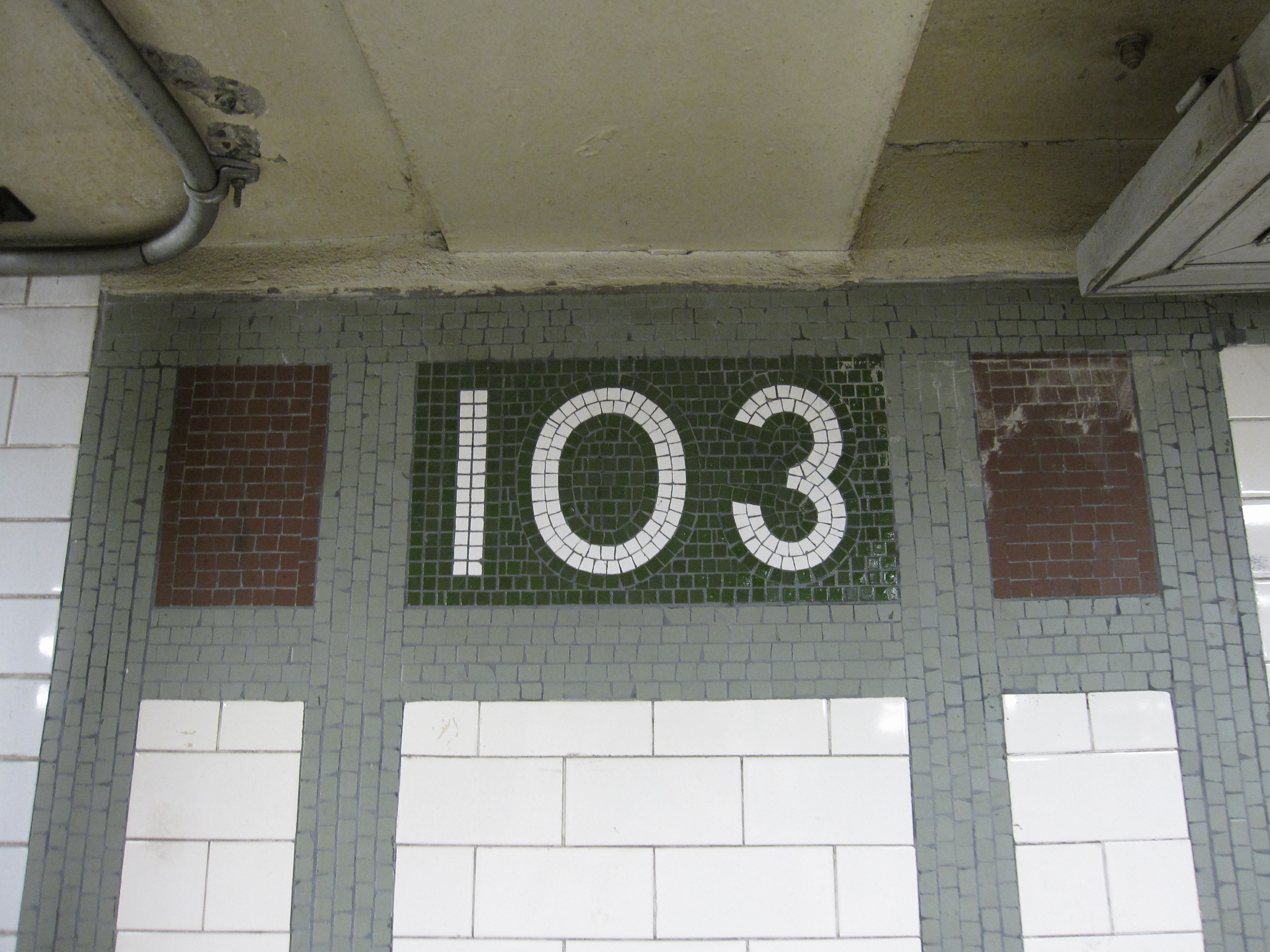
View of tiling installed on the platform extension

The city government took over the IRT's operations on June 12, 1940. Platforms at IRT Broadway–Seventh Avenue Line stations between 103rd Street and 238th Street were lengthened to 514 feet (157 m) between 1946 and 1948, allowing full ten-car express trains to stop at these stations. A contract for the platform extensions at 103rd Street and eight other stations on the line was awarded to Spencer, White & Prentis Inc. in October 1946, with an estimated cost of $3.891 million. The platform extensions at these stations were opened in stages. On April 6, 1948, the platform extensionsf at 103rd Street opened. Simultaneously, the IRT routes were given numbered designations with the introduction of "R-type" rolling stock, which contained rollsigns with numbered designations for each service. The route to 242nd Street became known as the 1. In 1959, all 1 trains became local.

On October 17, 1969, the New York City Transit Authority (NYCTA) adopted a contract to replace the station's original entrance in the center mall of Broadway at 103rd Street with new entrances on the sidewalk so it could be put out for bidding. The project was intended to allow passengers to enter the station without having to cross Broadway. The exit was closed and demolished after 1969.

In 1979, the New York City Landmarks Preservation Commission (LPC) designated space within the boundaries of the original stations at twelve IRT stations, excluding expansions made after 1904, as a city landmark. 103rd Street was not landmarked, unlike the 110th Street and 116th Street stations on the line. The 103rd Street station was left unprotected not because of a dearth of historic architecture, as with other structures that had been denied landmark status. Rather, its exclusion was part of a compromise between the Metropolitan Transportation Authority (MTA) and the LPC, which limited the scope of the interior-landmark designation.

In April 1988, the NYCTA unveiled plans to speed up service on the Broadway–Seventh Avenue Line through the implementation of a skip-stop service: the 9 train. When skip-stop service started in 1989, it was only implemented north of 137th Street–City College on weekdays, and 103rd Street was served by both the 1 and the 9.

==== 21st century ====
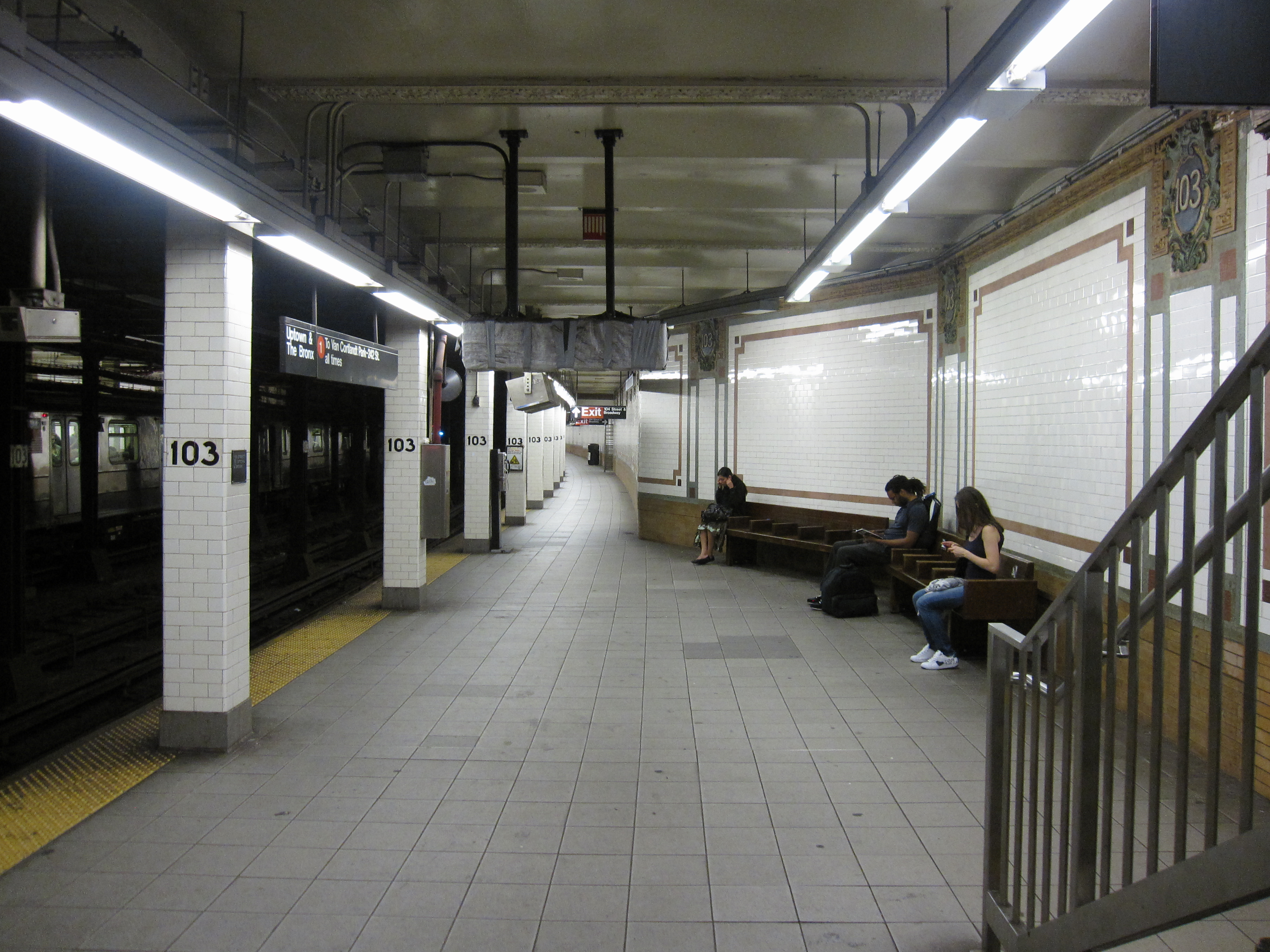
Northbound platform

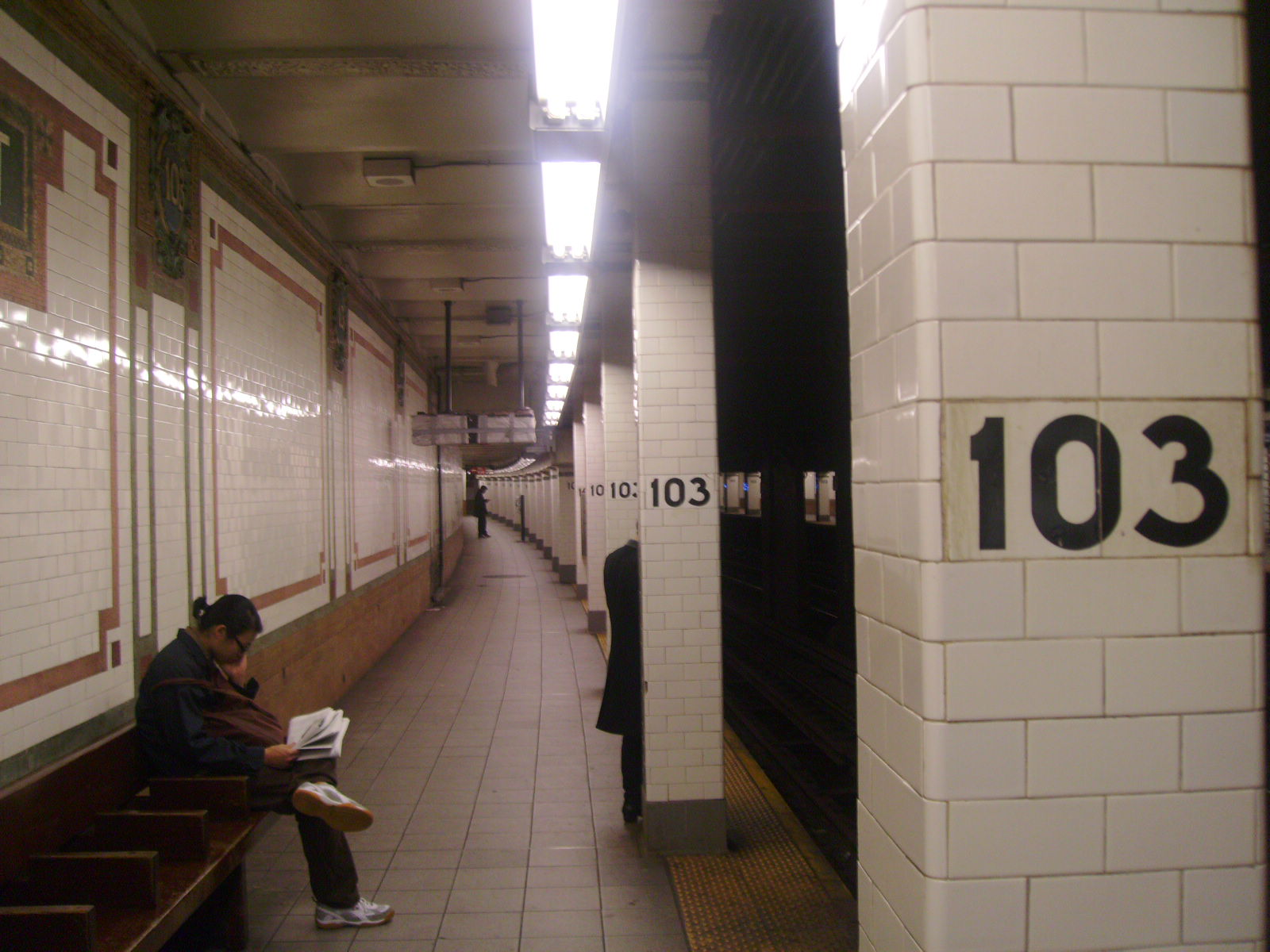
Narrower portion of the southbound platform

In June 2002, the MTA announced that ten subway stations citywide, including 103rd Street, 110th Street, 116th Street, 125th Street, and 231st Street on the IRT Broadway–Seventh Avenue Line, would receive renovations. As part of the project, fare control areas would be redesigned, flooring, and electrical and communication systems would be upgraded, and new lighting, public address systems and stairways would be installed. Historical elements at the four stations on the line in Manhattan would be replaced or restored, including their white wall tiles. At the ends of the station platforms at 103rd Street, 110th Street, and 116th Street, a small section of station wall, which would look identical to the existing station walls, would be added to provide space for scrubber rooms. Work on the ten citywide renovation projects was estimated to cost almost $146 million, and was scheduled to start later that year, and be completed in April 2004, in time for the 100th anniversary of the station's opening, and the 250th anniversary of Columbia University.

Columbia University agreed to contribute $1 million to the renovation of the 103rd Street station following its announcement in April that it would purchase a building adjacent to that station. As a condition of the funding allocation for the station renovation at 103rd Street, the university wanted work on the project to be expedited. Residents of Morningside Heights approved of the renovation plans, but were concerned that the expedited repairs would come at the cost of damaging the stations' historic elements. Block associations near the 103rd Street station contracted a firm to develop a plan to renovate the station quickly while maintaining its historic elements. The MTA was expected to decide whether preservation or speed would be prioritized in the station renovation projects by the end of the year.

In December 2002, Manhattan Community Board 7 voted in favor of the plan to include artwork from the MTA's Arts for Transit program at the 103rd Street station, which was not landmarked. Community Board 7 voted against the plan to include new artwork at the landmarked 110th Street and 116th Street stations. On February 4, 2003, Community Board 7 voted in favor of renovating the 103rd Street and 110th Street stations, but against the inclusion of any new artwork in the stations, going against the board's initial vote to support the installation of artwork at 103rd Street. The opposition to the addition of artwork at that stop stemmed from the belief among opponents of the plan for artwork that the station's historic features would be more vulnerable as the station was not landmarked. From May 31 to July 12, 2003, the uptown platforms at the 116th Street and 103rd Street stations were closed at all times for their renovations. Skip-stop service ended on May 27, 2005, as a result of a decrease in the number of riders who benefited.

== Station layout ==
This station was part of the original subway, and has two side platforms and three tracks, the center one being an unused express track. The station is served by the 1 at all times and is between 110th Street to the north and 96th Street to the south. The platforms were originally 350 feet (110 m) long, like at other stations north of 96th Street, but as a result of the 1948 platform extension, became 526 feet (160 m) long. The platform extensions are at the southern ends of the original platforms. The southbound platform is 9.25 feet (2.82 m) wide, while the northbound platform is 9.67 feet (2.95 m) wide. There is a mezzanine above the platforms, which contains the fare control area, as well as two stairs to each side of Broadway, and two stairs to both platforms. The station platforms are located on a curve.

The southbound local track is known as BB1 and the northbound one is BB4; the BB designation is used for chaining purposes along the Broadway–Seventh Avenue Line from 96th Street to 242nd Street and not in everyday speech. Although it cannot be accessed at 103rd Street, the center track is designated as M. South of the station, there are switches that connect the express track to either local track, with trains then being able to cross over to the rising express tracks from the IRT Lenox Avenue Line, which curve from 104th Street in the east.

=== Design ===
As with other stations built as part of the original IRT, the station was constructed using a cut-and-cover method. The tunnel is covered by a U-shaped trough that contains utility pipes and wires. This trough contains a foundation of concrete no less than 4 inches (100 mm) thick. Each platform consists of 3-inch-thick (7.6 cm) concrete slabs, beneath which are drainage basins. The original platforms contain circular, cast-iron Doric-style columns spaced every 15 feet (4.6 m), while the platform extensions contain I-beam columns. Additional columns between the tracks, spaced every 5 feet (1.5 m), support the jack-arched concrete station roofs. There is a 1-inch (25 mm) gap between the trough wall and the platform walls, which are made of 4-inch (100 mm)-thick brick covered over by a tiled finish.

The decorative scheme consists of green tile tablets; green, pink, and red tile bands; a yellow faience cornice; and blue faience plaques. The mosaic tiles at all original IRT stations were manufactured by the American Encaustic Tile Company, which subcontracted the installations at each station. The decorative work was performed by tile contractor Alfred Boote Company and faience contractor Grueby Faience Company.

=== Entrances and exits ===
==== Current entrances/exits ====
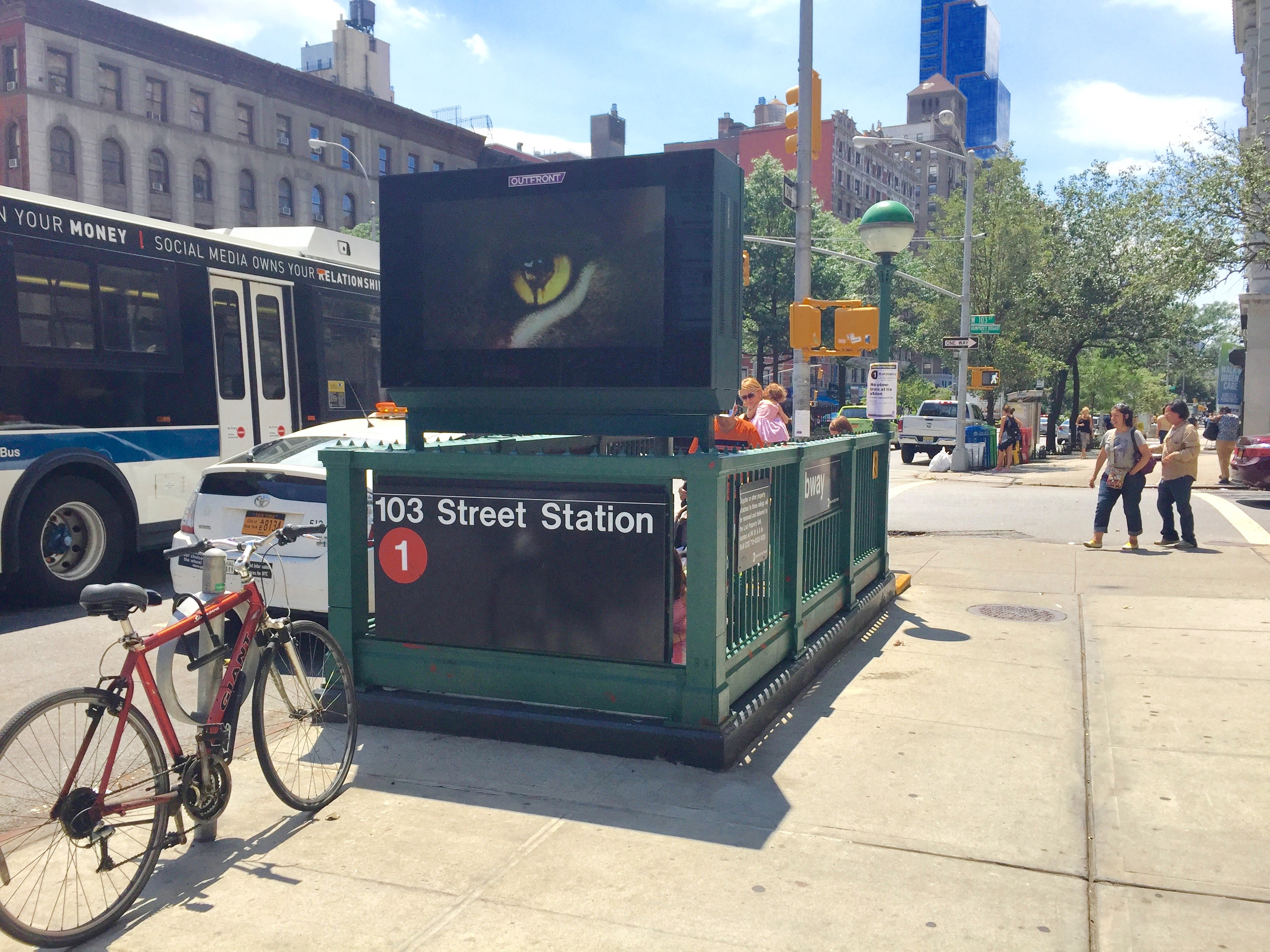
Northwestern corner stairs

The station has four entrance/exit stairs that serve both platforms. Two are on the northwest corner of Broadway and 103rd Street and two are on the northeastern corner of the same intersection. A fifth, exit-only stair leads from the northbound platform to the southeastern corner of Broadway and 104th Street.

==== Former station house ====
There was a station house in the median of Broadway, just north of 103rd Street, which was designed by Heins & LaFarge and dated to the station's opening in 1904. It was built as one of several station houses on the original IRT; similar station houses were built at Atlantic Avenue, Bowling Green, Mott Avenue, 72nd Street, and 116th Street.

The station house, which was identical to one at 116th Street, occupied an area of 50 by 20 feet (15.2 by 6.1 m). The one-story station house contained exterior walls made of buff brick, with a foundation made of granite blocks. A limestone string course ran atop the exterior wall. At the corners of the station house were limestone quoins, which supported a copper-and-terracotta gable roof facing west and east. The ridge of the station house's roof was a skylight made of glass and metal. The doorways were centrally located on the north and south walls of the station house, topped by terracotta finials and a rounded gable. There were terracotta crosses on each rounded gable with the number "103" embossed onto them. Above the doorway was a pediment and an arched window made of glass and wrought iron. It was closed and demolished after 1969.
