= Cathedral Parkway–110th Street station (IRT Broadway–Seventh Avenue Line) =

New York City Subway station in Manhattan

Cathedral Parkway–110 Street
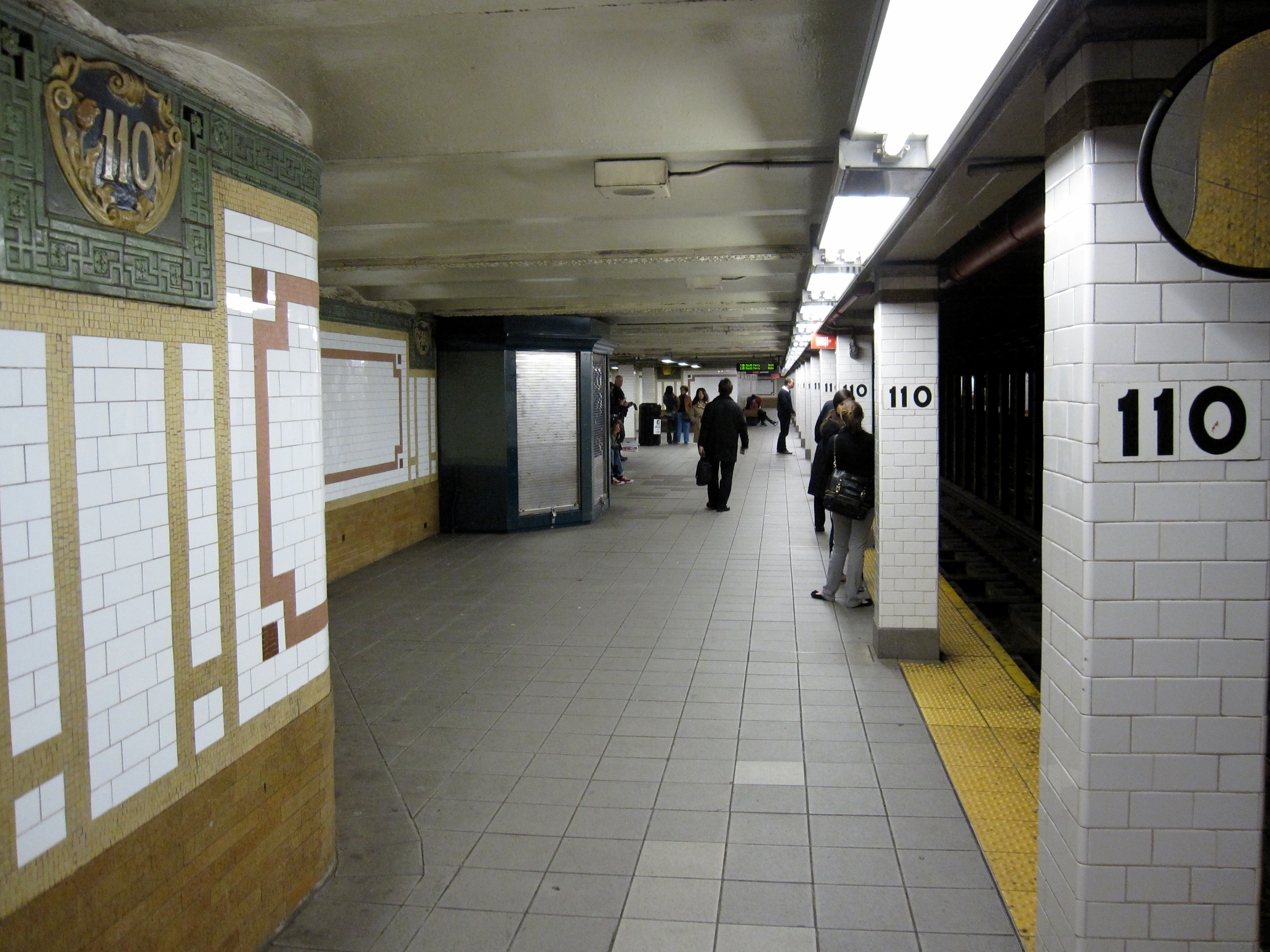
- Southbound platform

Station statistics
- Address: West 110th Street (Cathedral Parkway) & Broadway; New York, New York
- Borough: Manhattan
- Locale: Morningside Heights
- Coordinates: 40.804°N 73.967°W
- Division: A (IRT)
- Line: IRT Broadway–Seventh Avenue Line
- Services: 1 (all times)
- Transit: NYCT Bus: M4, M104
- Structure: Underground
- Platforms: 2 side platforms
- Tracks: 3 (2 in regular service)

Other information
- Opened: October 27, 1904; 122 years ago
- Accessible: No; planned

Traffic
- 2025: 3,068,346 ▲6.7%
- Rank: 122 out of 423
Services
Preceding station	New York City Subway	Following station
116th Street–Columbia University toward Van Cortlandt Park–242nd Street	Local	103rd Street toward South Ferry
Location
Location within New York City Subway
Location within New York City
Location within New York
Track layout
Street map
Station service legend
Symbol	Description
Stops all times	Stops all times
- 110th Street--Cathedral Parkway Subway Station (IRT)
- U.S. National Register of Historic Places
- New York City Landmark
- MPS: New York City Subway System MPS
- NRHP reference No.: 04001019
- NYCL No.: 1096

Significant dates
- Added to NRHP: September 17, 2004
- Designated NYCL: October 23, 1979

The Cathedral Parkway–110th Street station is a local station on the IRT Broadway–Seventh Avenue Line of the New York City Subway. Located at the intersection of Cathedral Parkway and Broadway in the Morningside Heights neighborhood of Manhattan, it is served by the 1 train at all times.

The 110th Street station was constructed for the Interborough Rapid Transit Company (IRT) as part of the city's first subway line, which was approved in 1900. Construction of the line segment that includes 110th Street began on June 18 of the same year. The station opened on October 27, 1904, as one of the original 28 stations of the New York City Subway. The station's platforms were lengthened in 1948 to accommodate ten-car trains, and the station was renovated in the 2000s.

The 110th Street station contains two side platforms and three tracks; the center track is not used in regular service. The station was built with tile and mosaic decorations. The platforms contain exits to 110th Street and Broadway and are not connected to each other within fare control. The original section of the station is a New York City designated landmark and listed on the National Register of Historic Places.

== History ==
=== Construction and opening ===
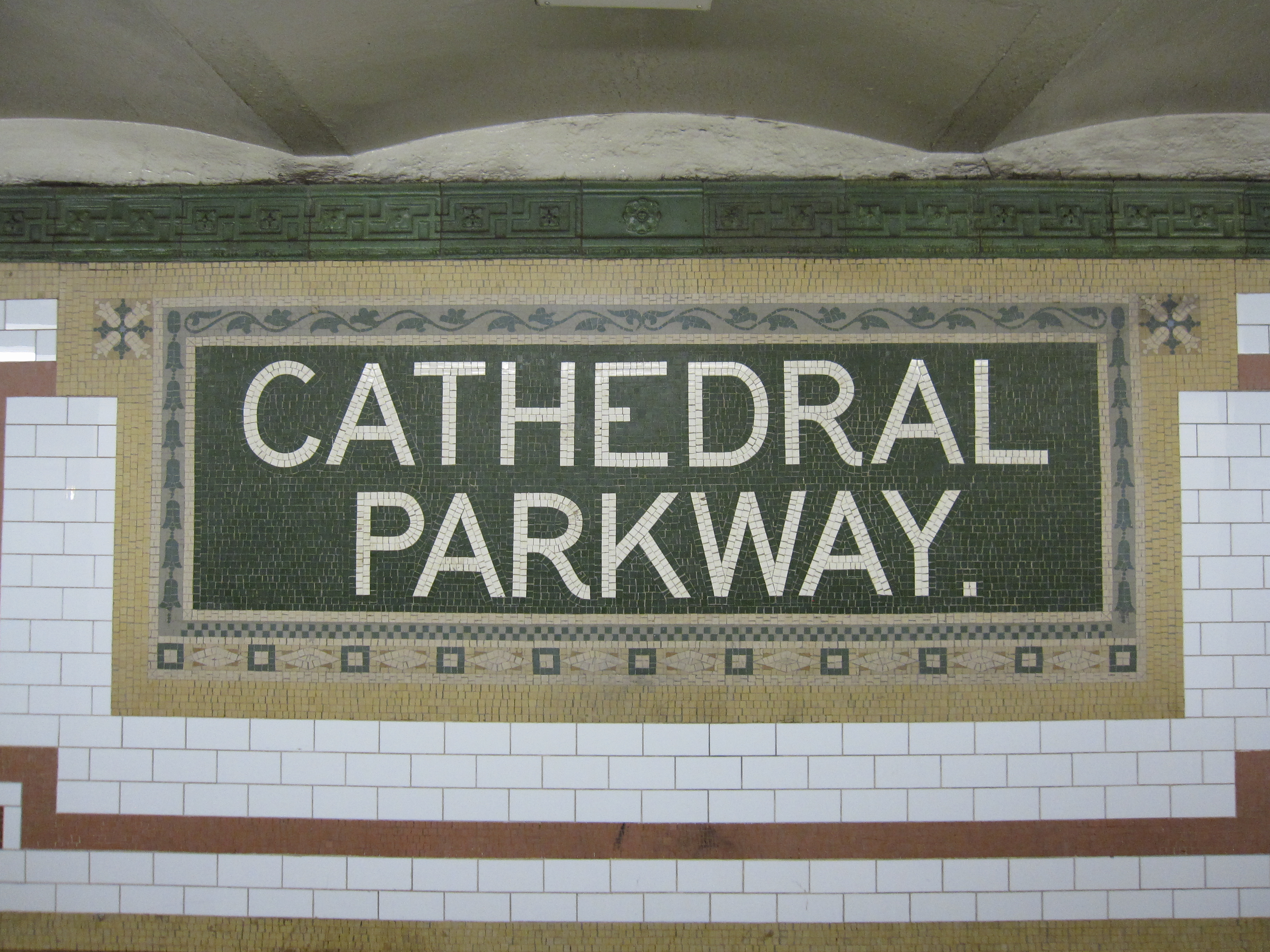
Large mosaic name tablet

Planning for a subway line in New York City dates to 1864, but development of what became the city's first subway line did not start until 1894, when the New York State Legislature passed the Rapid Transit Act. The subway plans were drawn up by a team of engineers led by William Barclay Parsons, the Rapid Transit Commission's chief engineer. It called for a subway line from New York City Hall in lower Manhattan to the Upper West Side, where two branches would lead north into the Bronx. A plan was formally adopted in 1897, and all legal conflicts over the route alignment were resolved near the end of 1899.

The Rapid Transit Construction Company, organized by John B. McDonald and funded by August Belmont Jr., signed the initial Contract 1 with the Rapid Transit Commission in February 1900, under which it would construct the subway and maintain a 50-year operating lease from the opening of the line. In 1901, the firm of Heins & LaFarge was hired to design the underground stations. Belmont incorporated the Interborough Rapid Transit Company (IRT) in April 1902 to operate the subway.

The 110th Street station was constructed as part of the IRT's West Side Line (now the Broadway–Seventh Avenue Line) from 104th Street to 125th Street, for which construction began on June 18, 1900. The section of the West Side Line around this station was originally planned as a two-track line, but in early 1901, was changed to a three-track structure to permit train storage in the center track. Construction on the section between 104th Street and 125th Street had already begun prior to the design change, requiring that a portion of the work be undone. A third track was added directly north of 96th Street, immediately east of the originally planned two tracks. By late 1903, the subway was nearly complete, but the IRT Powerhouse and the system's electrical substations were still under construction, delaying the system's opening.

The 110th Street station opened on October 27, 1904, as one of the original 28 stations of the New York City Subway from City Hall to 145th Street on the West Side Branch. The opening of the first subway line, and particularly the 110th Street station, helped contribute to the development of Morningside Heights and Harlem. Real-estate speculators built single-family rowhouses between 105th and 109th Streets, as well as the Manhasset Apartments between 108th and 109th Streets, in anticipation of the 110th Street station's opening.

=== Service changes and station renovations ===
==== 20th century ====
After the first subway line was completed in 1908, the station was served by West Side local and express trains. Express trains began at South Ferry in Manhattan or Atlantic Avenue in Brooklyn, and ended at 242nd Street in the Bronx. Local trains ran from City Hall to 242nd Street during rush hours, continuing south from City Hall to South Ferry at other times. In 1918, the Broadway–Seventh Avenue Line opened south of Times Square–42nd Street, and the original line was divided into an H-shaped system. The original subway north of Times Square thus became part of the Broadway–Seventh Avenue Line. Local trains were sent to South Ferry, while express trains used the new Clark Street Tunnel to Brooklyn.

To address overcrowding, in 1909, the New York Public Service Commission proposed lengthening the platforms at stations along the original IRT subway. As part of a modification to the IRT's construction contracts made on January 18, 1910, the company was to lengthen station platforms to accommodate ten-car express and six-car local trains. In addition to $1.5 million (equivalent to $51.8 million in 2025) spent on platform lengthening, $500,000 (equivalent to $17.3 million in 2025) was spent on building additional entrances and exits. It was anticipated that these improvements would increase capacity by 25 percent. The northbound platform at the 110th Street station was extended 135 feet (41 m) to the south, while the southbound platform was not lengthened. Six-car local trains began operating in October 1910, and ten-car express trains began running on the West Side Line on January 24, 1911. Subsequently, the station could accommodate six-car local trains, but ten-car trains could not open some of their doors. In conjunction with the platform lengthening, an additional entrance to the station was constructed. The new entrance was completed in 1911, except for finishing work and the installation of a kiosk. Following the installation of railings and a ticket booth, this entrance was opened on January 17, 1912. The kiosk and some finishing work were completed after the entrance had opened. In 1925, the New York City Board of Estimate ordered the removal of the three entrance kiosks at 110th Street for imperiling the safety of pedestrians and drivers by obstructing vision, and requested that the New York City Board of Transportation henceforth build entrances adjacent to the building line, or preferably, in buildings. The project was completed in 1926.

The city government took over the IRT's operations on June 12, 1940. Platforms at IRT Broadway–Seventh Avenue Line stations between 103rd Street and 238th Street, including those at 110th Street, were lengthened to 514 feet (157 m) between 1946 and 1948, allowing full ten-car express trains to stop at these stations. A contract for the platform extensions at 110th Street and eight other stations on the line was awarded to Spencer, White & Prentis Inc. in October 1946, with an estimated cost of $3.891 million. The platform extensions at these stations were opened in stages. On April 6, 1948, the platform extension at 110th Street opened. Simultaneously, the IRT routes were given numbered designations with the introduction of "R-type" rolling stock, which contained rollsigns with numbered designations for each service. The route to 242nd Street became known as the 1. In 1959, all 1 trains became local.

In 1979, the New York City Landmarks Preservation Commission designated the space within the boundaries of the original station, excluding expansions made after 1904, as a city landmark. The station was designated along with eleven others on the original IRT.

In April 1988, the New York City Transit Authority (NYCTA) unveiled plans to speed up service on the Broadway–Seventh Avenue Line through the implementation of a skip-stop service: the 9 train. When skip-stop service started in 1989, it was only implemented north of 137th Street–City College on weekdays, and 110th Street was served by both the 1 and the 9.

==== 21st century ====
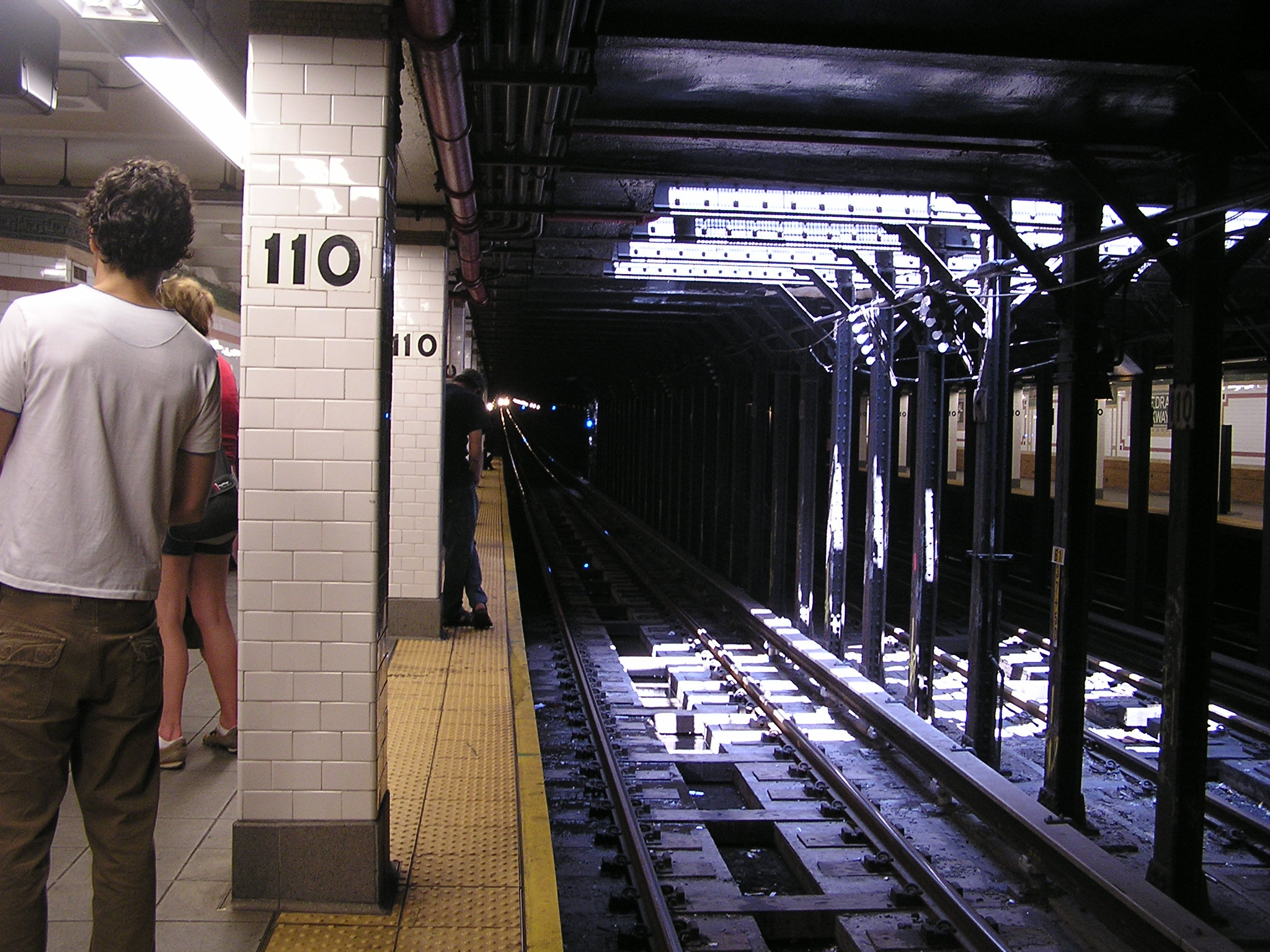
Skylights allowing light in from the street above

In June 2002, the Metropolitan Transportation Authority (MTA) announced that ten subway stations citywide, including 103rd Street, 110th Street, 116th Street, 125th Street, and 231st Street on the IRT Broadway–Seventh Avenue Line, would receive renovations. As part of the project, fare control areas would be redesigned, flooring, and electrical and communication systems would be upgraded, and new lighting, public address systems and stairways would be installed. In addition, since 110th Street, 116th Street, and 125th Street had landmark status, historical elements would be replaced or restored. At the ends of the station platforms at 103rd Street, 110th Street, and 116th Street, a small section of station wall, which would look identical to the existing station walls, would be added to provide space for scrubber rooms. Work on the ten citywide renovation projects was estimated to cost almost $146 million, and was scheduled to start later that year, and be completed in April 2004, in time for the 100th anniversary of the station's opening, and the 250th anniversary of Columbia University.

In September 2002, Columbia University was in negotiations to provide funding for the renovation of the 110th Street station, following a similar agreement to cover a portion of the cost to renovate the 103rd Street station. As a condition of the funding allocation, the university wanted work on the project to be expedited. Residents of Morningside Heights approved of the renovation plans, but were concerned that the expedited repairs would come at the cost of damaging the stations' historic elements. A plan to renovate the station quickly while maintaining its historic elements was already completed for the 110th Street station. The MTA was expected to decide whether preservation or speed would be prioritized in the station renovation projects by the end of the year.

At the 110th Street and 116th Street stations, local community activists opposed artwork that was planned to be commissioned through the MTA's Arts for Transit program. Though the proposed artwork was intended as a homage to the stations' history, the activists believed the art would damage the decorative tiling that dated from the stations' opening, and that the artwork would damage the landmark interiors of the stations. The MTA had planned to install a small bronze subway track and train to be inlaid within the station walls surrounded by sepia-toned photographs of the neighborhood at 110th Street. In December 2002, Manhattan Community Board 7 voted in favor of the plan to include artwork from the MTA's Arts for Transit program at the 103rd Street station, which was not landmarked. Community Board 7 voted against the plan to include new artwork at the landmarked 110th Street and 116th Street stations, and the MTA dropped plans for the artwork at these stations. On February 4, 2003, Community Board 7 voted in favor of renovating the 103rd Street and 110th Street stations, but against the inclusion of any new artwork in the stations, going against the board's initial vote to support the installation of artwork at 103rd Street.

Due to concerns expressed by community groups, the addition of art to this station and the 116th Street station was dropped. Between October 5 and November 17, 2003, the downtown platforms at 110th Street and 125th Street were closed to expedite work on their renovations. The original interiors were listed on the National Register of Historic Places in 2004. Skip-stop service ended on May 27, 2005, as a result of a decrease in the number of riders who benefited.

In July 2025, the MTA announced that it would install elevators at 12 stations, including the Cathedral Parkway–110th Street station, as part of its 2025–2029 capital program. The elevators would make the station fully compliant with the Americans with Disabilities Act of 1990.

== Station layout ==
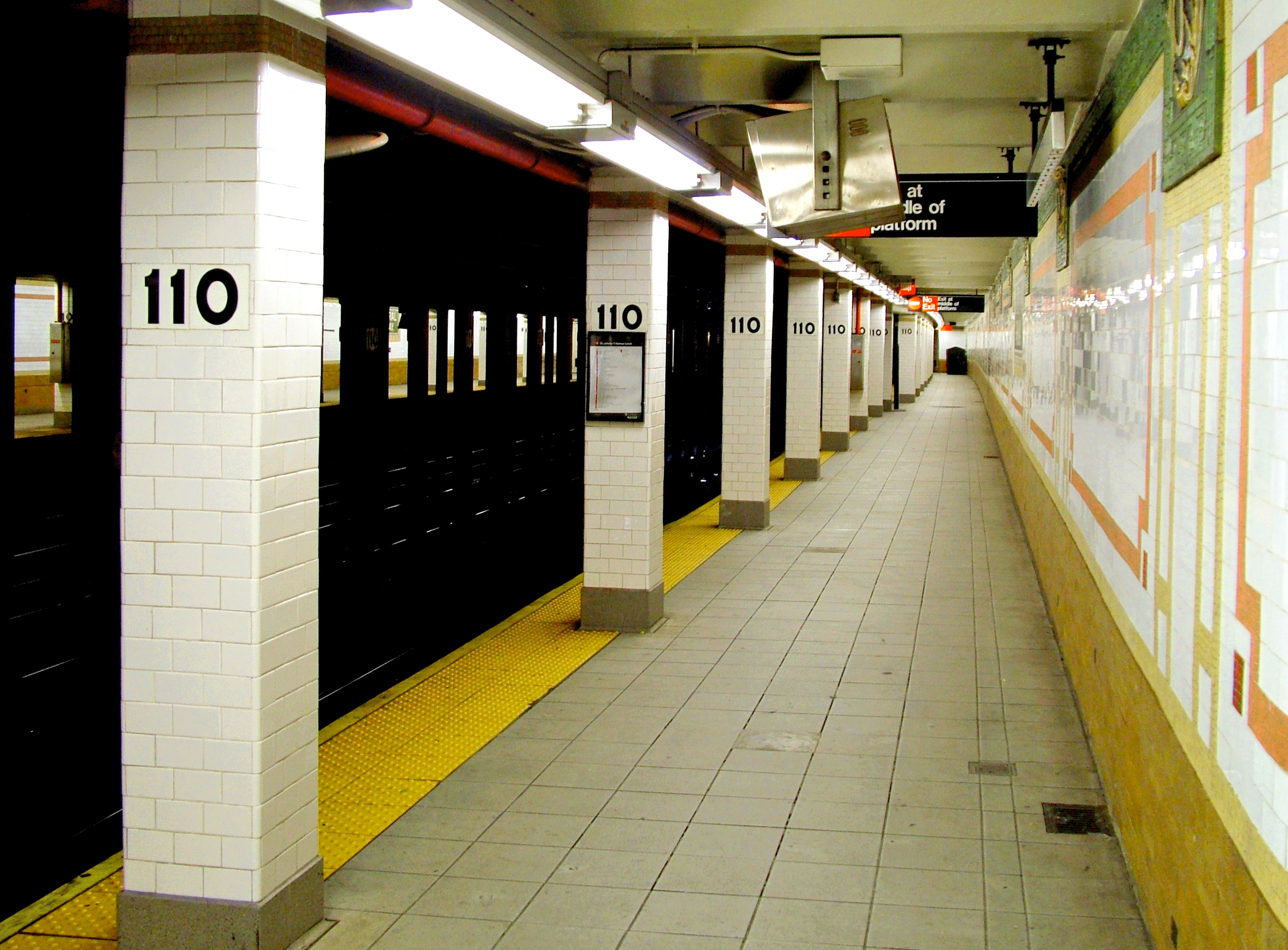
View of the southern end of the downtown platform

This station has two side platforms and three tracks, the center one being an unused express track. The station is served by the 1 at all times and is between 116th Street to the north and 103rd Street to the south.

The platforms were originally 350 feet (110 m) long, like at other stations north of 96th Street, but as a result of the 1948 platform extension, became 520 feet (160 m) long. The platform extensions are at the southern ends of the original platforms.

The southbound local track is technically known as BB1 and the northbound one is BB4; the BB designation is used for chaining purposes along the Broadway–Seventh Avenue Line from 96th Street to 242nd Street. Although it cannot be accessed at Cathedral Parkway–110th Street, the center track is designated as M. These designations are rarely, if ever, used in ordinary conversation.

=== Design ===
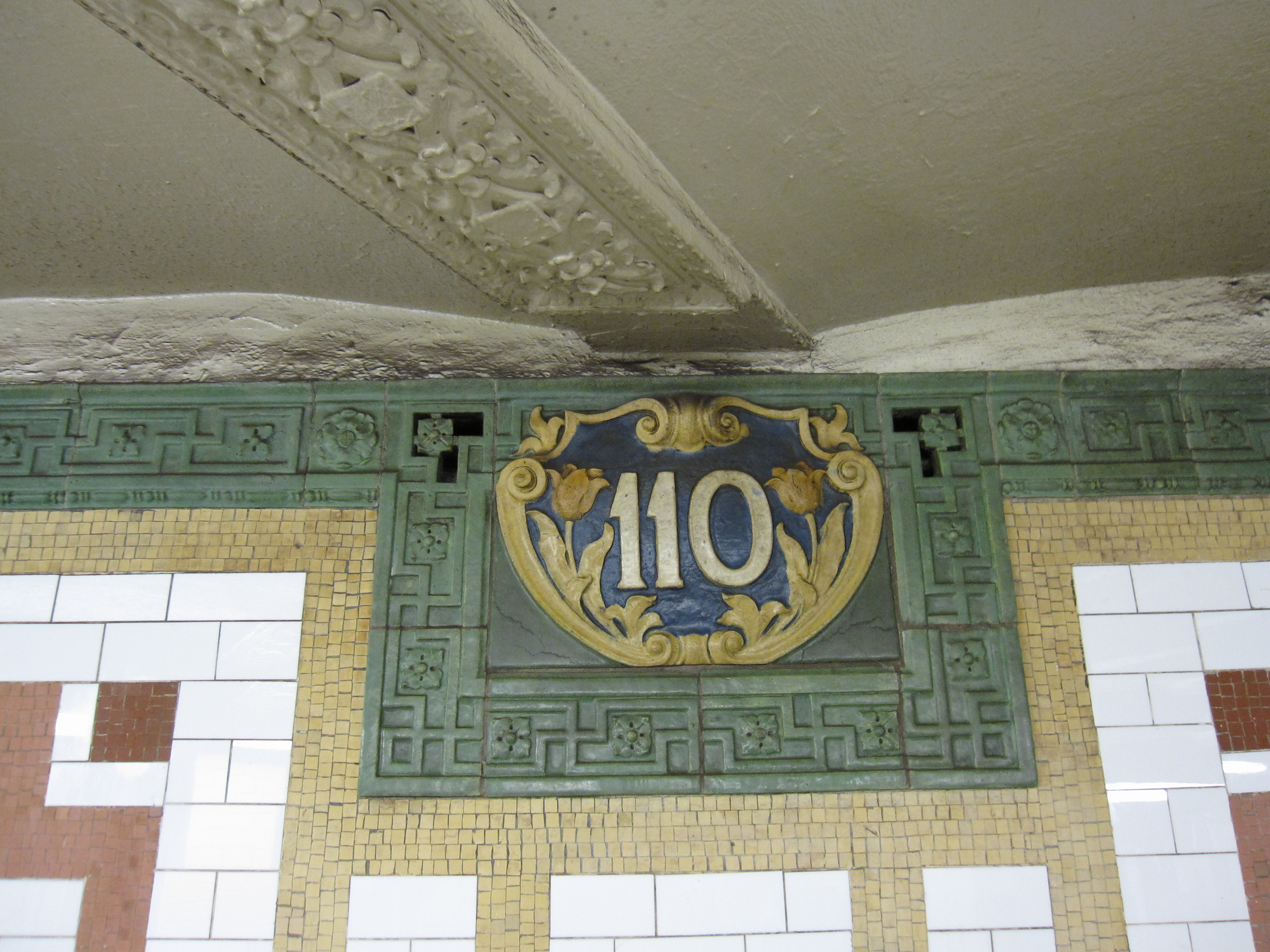
Original ceramic cartouche

As with other stations built as part of the original IRT, the station was constructed using a cut-and-cover method. The tunnel is covered by a U-shaped trough that contains utility pipes and wires. This trough contains a foundation of concrete no less than 4 inches (100 mm) thick. Each platform consists of 3-inch-thick (7.6 cm) concrete slabs, beneath which are drainage basins. The original platforms contain circular, cast-iron Doric-style columns spaced every 15 feet (4.6 m), while the platform extensions contain I-beam columns. Additional columns between the tracks, spaced every 5 feet (1.5 m), support the jack-arched concrete station roofs. There is a 1-inch (25 mm) gap between the trough wall and the platform walls, which are made of 4-inch (100 mm)-thick brick covered over by a tiled finish.

The fare control is at platform level, and there is no crossover or crossunder between the platforms. The walls along the platforms consist of a Roman brick wainscoting on the lowest part of the wall, and buff-colored mosaic tiles above. The platform walls are divided at 15-foot (4.6 m) intervals by salmon tile pilasters, or vertical bands. The pilasters are topped by blue faience plaques with the number "110", surrounded by motifs of wreaths. Green-and-white mosaic wall tablets with the name "Cathedral Parkway" are installed along the platform walls, accented by buff, pink, and red motifs. The design of the station, which was completed by Heins and LaFarge, were inspired by work they were doing simultaneously at other projects in Morningside Heights, including work on the Cathedral of St. John the Divine. The dark Victorian colors used in the station were taken from Charles McKim's design of Columbia University's Low Library rotunda. The mosaic tiles at all original IRT stations were manufactured by the American Encaustic Tile Company, which subcontracted the installations at each station. The decorative work was performed by tile contractor John H. Parry and faience contractor Grueby Faience Company.

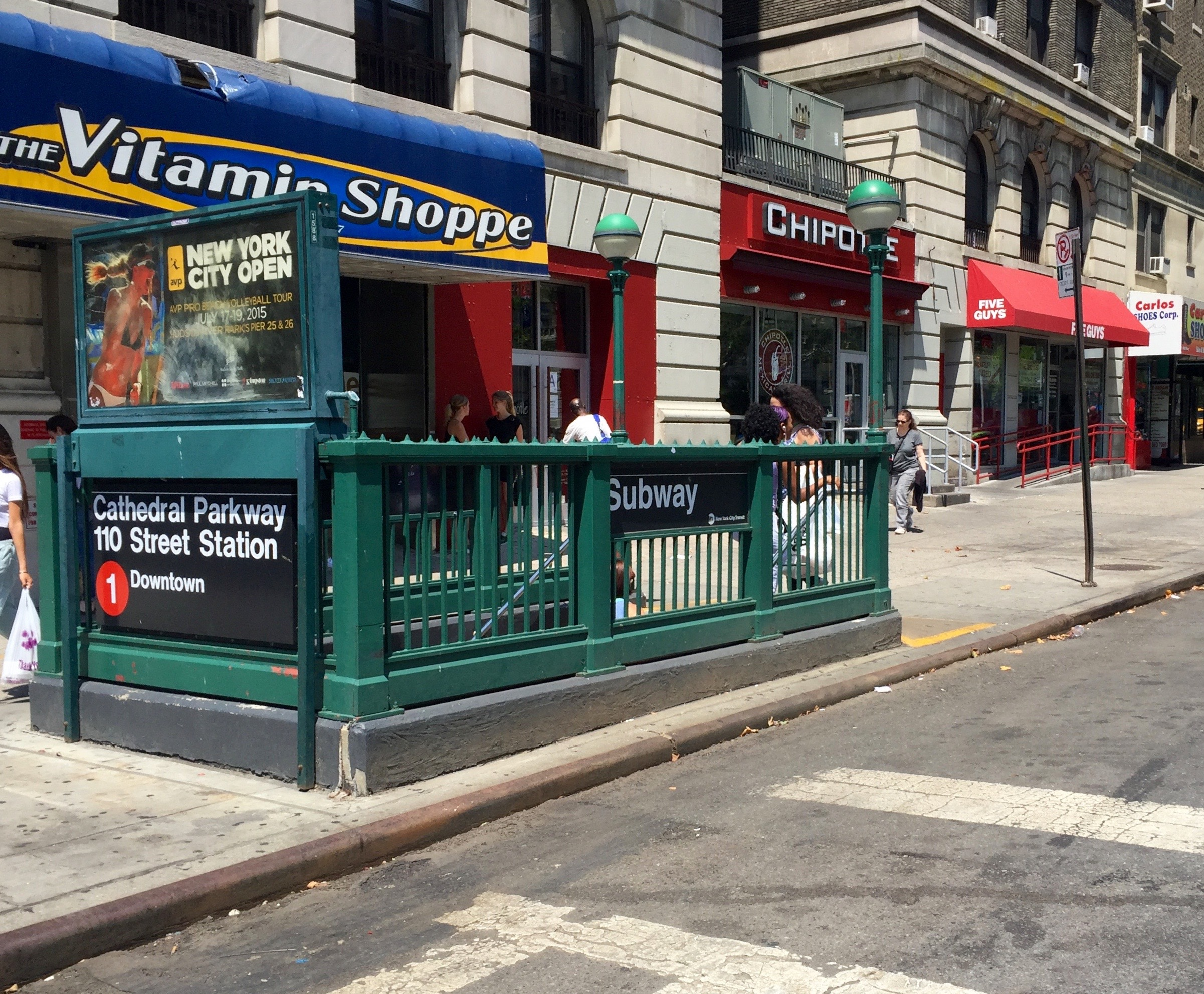
Northwestern corner street stair

The downtown platform has two doors leading to telephone and electrical distribution rooms at its southern end, and a paneled metal door on the northern end. The uptown platform has closets in the fare control area, which were formerly men's and women's restrooms.

=== Entrances and exits ===
The only entrance to the southbound platform is at the northwest corner of 110th Street and Broadway. There are entrances to the northbound platform from both the north-eastern and south-eastern corners of 110th Street and Broadway. The street staircases contain relatively simple, modern steel railings like those seen at most New York City Subway stations. The Cathedral of St. John the Divine is one block east of the exits.
