= 23rd Street station (IRT Broadway–Seventh Avenue Line) =

New York City Subway station in Manhattan

23 Street
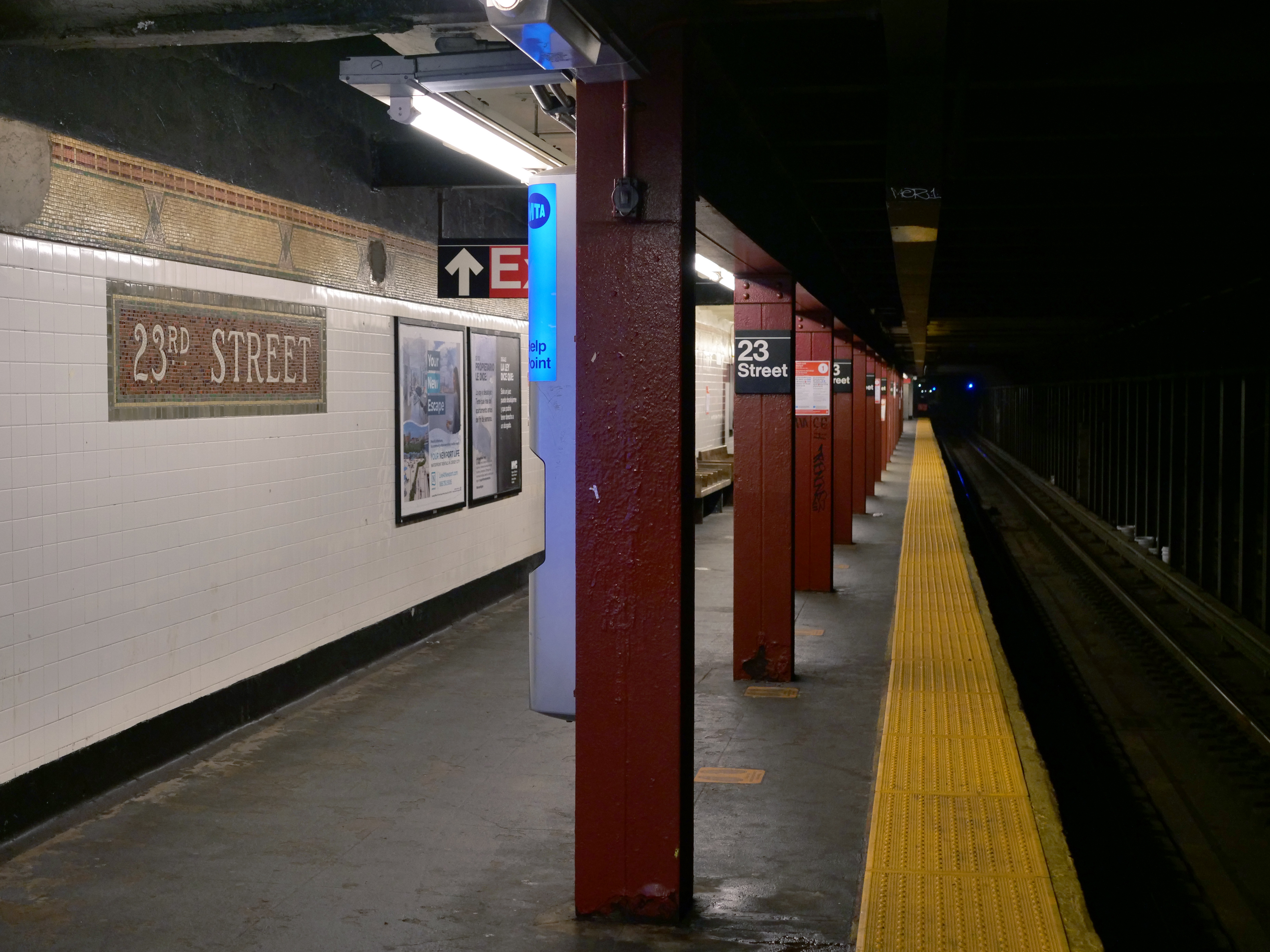
- View of northbound platform

Station statistics
- Address: West 23rd Street & Seventh Avenue; New York, New York
- Borough: Manhattan
- Locale: Chelsea
- Coordinates: 40.744°N 73.996°W
- Division: A (IRT)
- Line: IRT Broadway–Seventh Avenue Line
- Services: 1 (all times); 2 (late nights)
- Transit: NYCT Bus: M7, M20, M23 SBS
- Structure: Underground
- Platforms: 2 side platforms
- Tracks: 4

Other information
- Opened: July 1, 1918; 108 years ago
- Accessible: No; planned

Traffic
- 2025: 3,413,261 ▲5.6%
- Rank: 109 out of 423
Services
| Preceding station | New York City Subway | Following station |
|---|---|---|
| 28th Street 1 2 toward Van Cortlandt Park–242nd Street | Local | 18th Street 1 2 toward South Ferry |
does not stop here
Location
Location within New York City Subway
Location within New York City
Location within New York
Track layout
Street map
Station service legend
| Symbol | Description |
| Stops all times | Stops all times |
| Stops late nights only | Stops late nights only |
| Stops late nights and weekends | Stops late nights and weekends |

The 23rd Street station is a local station on the IRT Broadway–Seventh Avenue Line of the New York City Subway. Located at 23rd Street and Seventh Avenue in the Chelsea neighborhood of Manhattan, it is served by the 1 train at all times and by the 2 train during late nights. The station was built by the Interborough Rapid Transit Company (IRT) as part of the Dual Contracts with New York City, and opened on July 1, 1918. The station had its platforms extended in the 1960s, and was renovated in the 1990s.

== History ==
=== Construction and opening ===
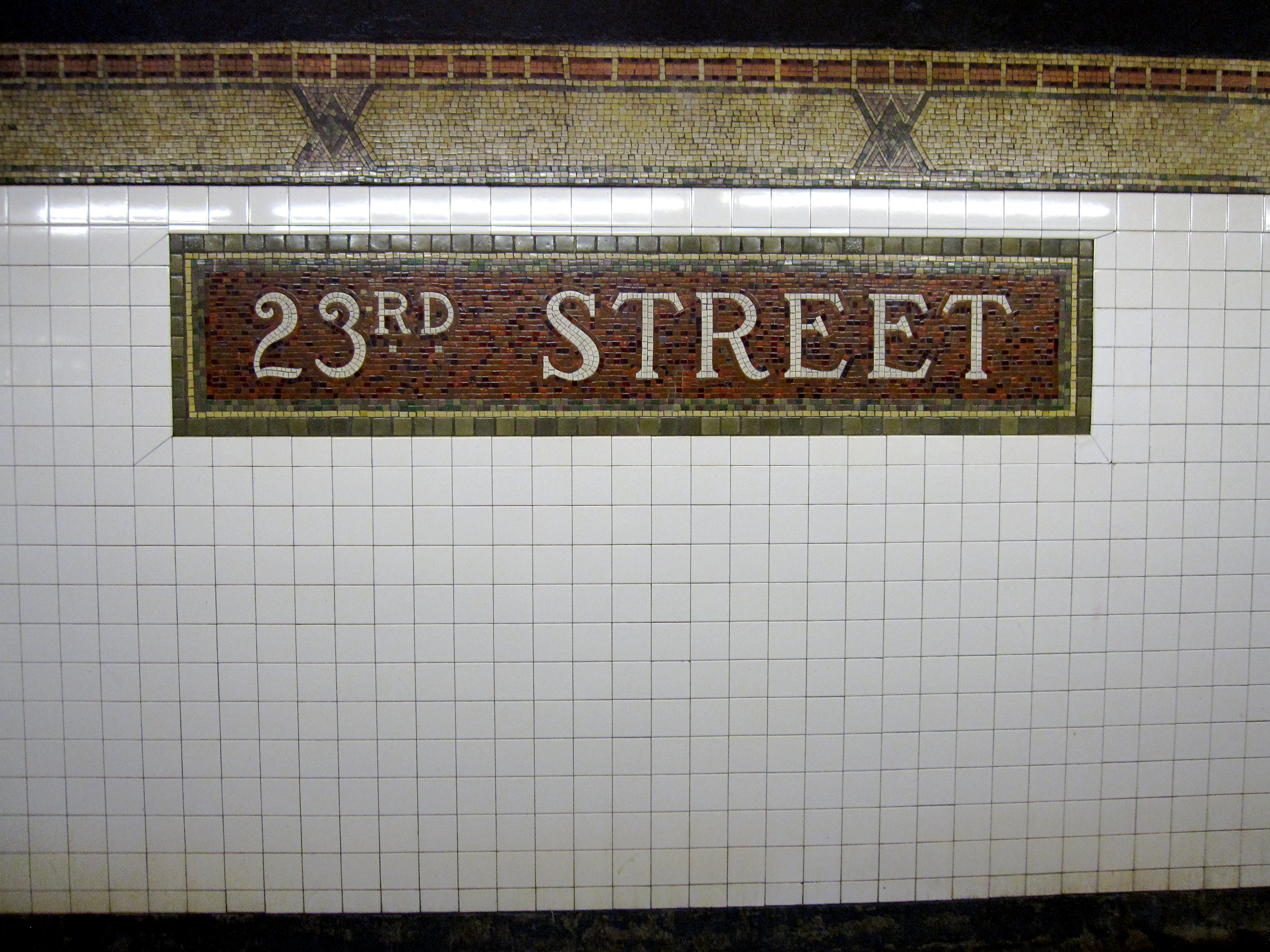
Mosaic name tablet

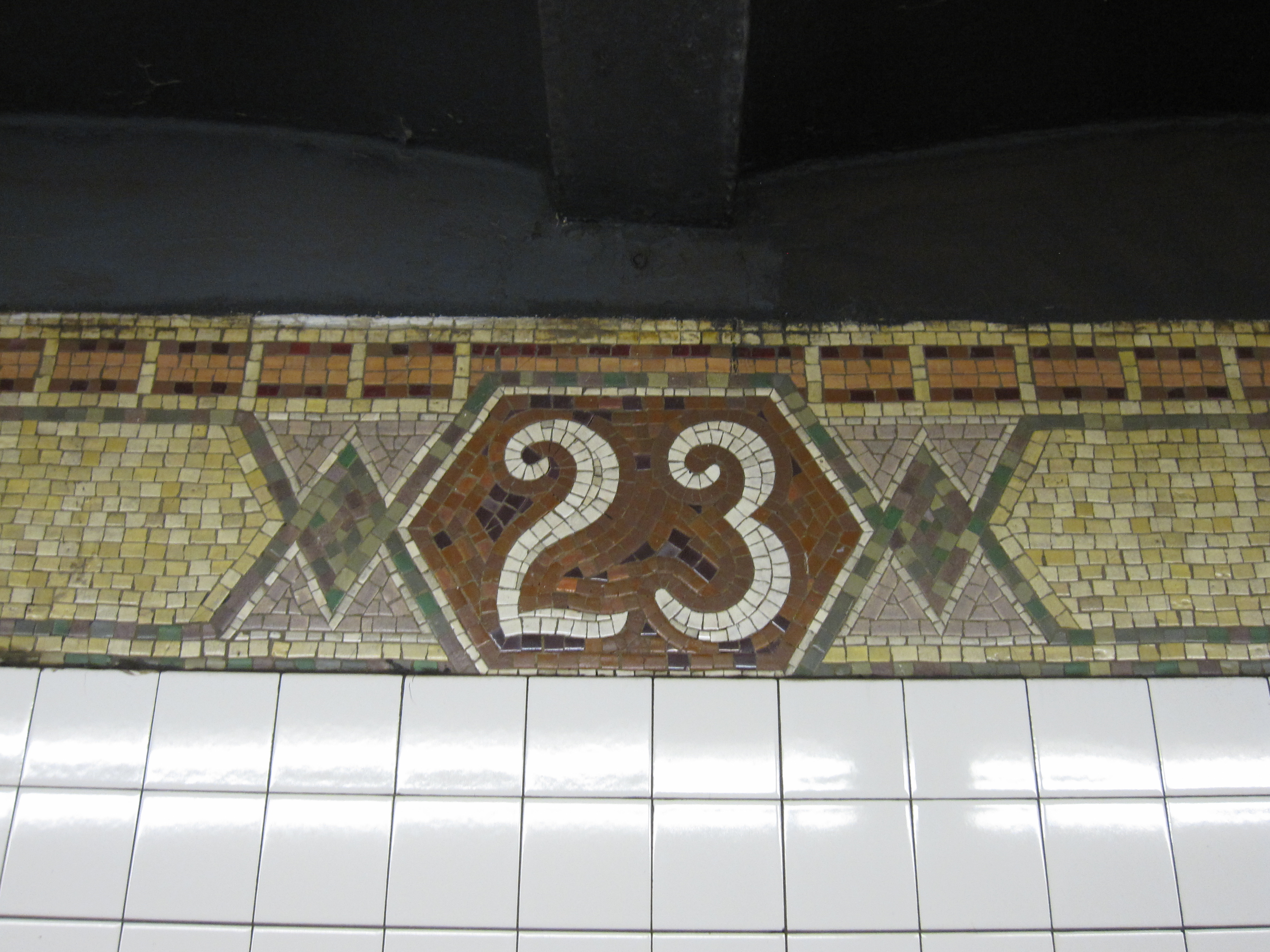
Number tablet on trim line

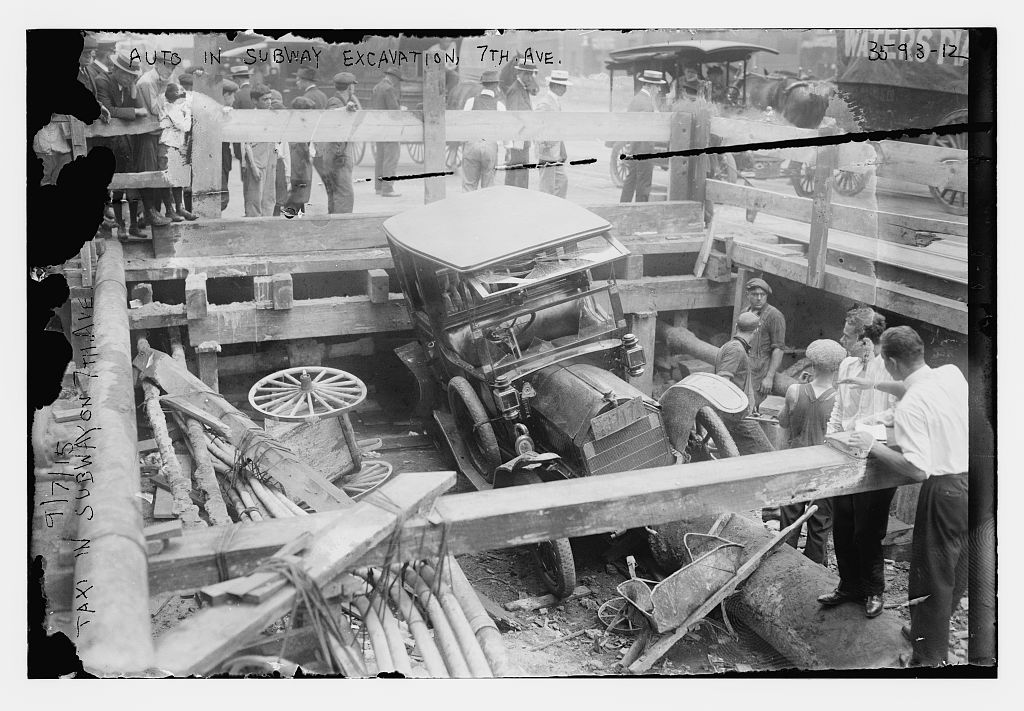
1915 Seventh Avenue subway collapse with car fallen in tunnel

The Dual Contracts, which were signed on March 19, 1913, were contracts for the construction and/or rehabilitation and operation of rapid transit lines in the City of New York. The contracts were "dual" in that they were signed between the City and two separate private companies (the Interborough Rapid Transit Company and the Brooklyn Rapid Transit Company), all working together to make the construction of the Dual Contracts possible. The Dual Contracts promised the construction of several lines in Brooklyn. As part of Contract 4, the IRT agreed to build a branch of the original subway line south down Seventh Avenue, Varick Street, and West Broadway to serve the West Side of Manhattan.

The construction of this line, in conjunction with the construction of the Lexington Avenue Line, would change the operation of the IRT system. Instead of having trains go via Broadway, turning onto 42nd Street, before finally turning onto Park Avenue, there would be two trunk lines connected by the 42nd Street Shuttle. The system would be changed from looking like a "Z" system on a map to an "H" system. One trunk would run via the new Lexington Avenue Line down Park Avenue, and the other trunk would run via the new Seventh Avenue Line up Broadway. In order for the line to continue down Varick Street and West Broadway, these streets needed to be widened, and two new streets were built, the Seventh Avenue Extension and the Varick Street Extension. It was predicted that the subway extension would lead to the growth of the Lower West Side, and to neighborhoods such as Chelsea and Greenwich Village.

On September 22, 1915, there was an explosion during construction of the 23rd Street subway station that caused the tunnel to collapse. Seven people were killed after a blast of dynamite in the subway tunnel destroyed the plank roadway over Seventh Avenue. As a result, a crowded trolley car, and a brewery truck fell into the excavation, accounting for most of the injuries.

23rd Street station opened as part of an extension of the line from 34th Street–Penn Station to South Ferry on July 1, 1918. Initially, the station was served by a shuttle running from Times Square to South Ferry. The new "H" system was implemented on August 1, 1918, joining the two halves of the Broadway–Seventh Avenue Line and sending all West Side trains south from Times Square. An immediate result of the switch was the need to transfer using the 42nd Street Shuttle in order to retrace the original layout. The completion of the "H" system doubled the capacity of the IRT system.

=== Later years ===
The city government took over the IRT's operations on June 12, 1940. On August 9, 1964, the New York City Transit Authority (NYCTA) announced the letting of a $7.6 million contract to lengthen platforms at stations on the Broadway—Seventh Avenue Line from Rector Street to 34th Street–Penn Station, including 23rd Street, and stations from Central Park North–110th Street to 145th Street on the Lenox Avenue Line to allow express trains to be lengthened from nine-car trains to ten-car trains, and to lengthen locals from eight-car trains to ten-car trains. With the completion of this project, the NYCTA project to lengthen IRT stations to accommodate ten-car trains would be complete.

This station was renovated in the 1990s.

In April 2021, as part of a network accessibility trial, the Metropolitan Transportation Authority installed a braille map along the northbound platform wall. As part of its 2025–2029 Capital Program, the MTA has proposed making the station wheelchair-accessible in compliance with the Americans with Disabilities Act of 1990.

== Station layout ==
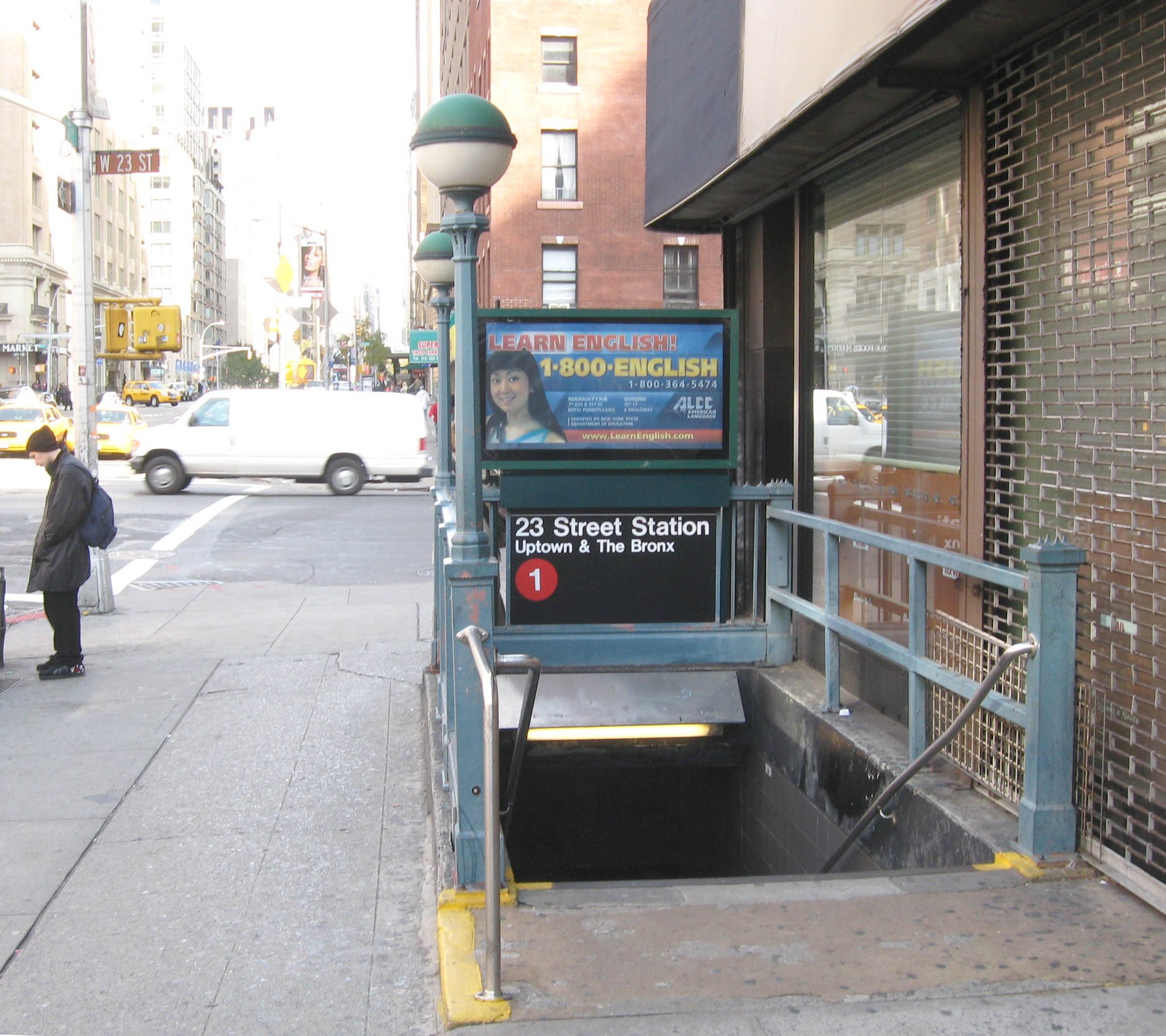
Northbound street stair

This underground station has two side platforms and four tracks. The station is served by the 1 at all times and by the 2 during late nights; the center express tracks are used by the 2 and 3 trains during daytime hours. It is between 28th Street to the north and 18th Street to the south.

Both platforms have their original mosaic trim line and name tablets of a predominately brown and red color along with yellow and olive green. Except for at either end of the platforms where it gets narrower, both also have maroon I-beam columns running along them at regular intervals, alternating ones having the standard black station name plate with white lettering.

23rd St subway cross-section
| 8th Av | 7th Av | 6th Av | | | 5th Av & Broadway | Park Av |
| A / C / E | 1 / 2 / 3 | FM↓ | PATH | FM↑ | N / Q / R / W | 6 / <6> |
| underpass | | underpass |

=== Exits ===
Each platform has one same-level fare control area in their center and there are no crossunders or crossovers. The northbound platform has the station's full-time turnstile bank and token booth and two staircases going to either eastern corners of 23rd Street and Seventh Avenue. The southbound platform has an unstaffed set of turnstiles and two staircases going up to either western corners of the same intersection.
