= Rebar (New York City) =

Gay bar and nightclub in New York City

- Logo

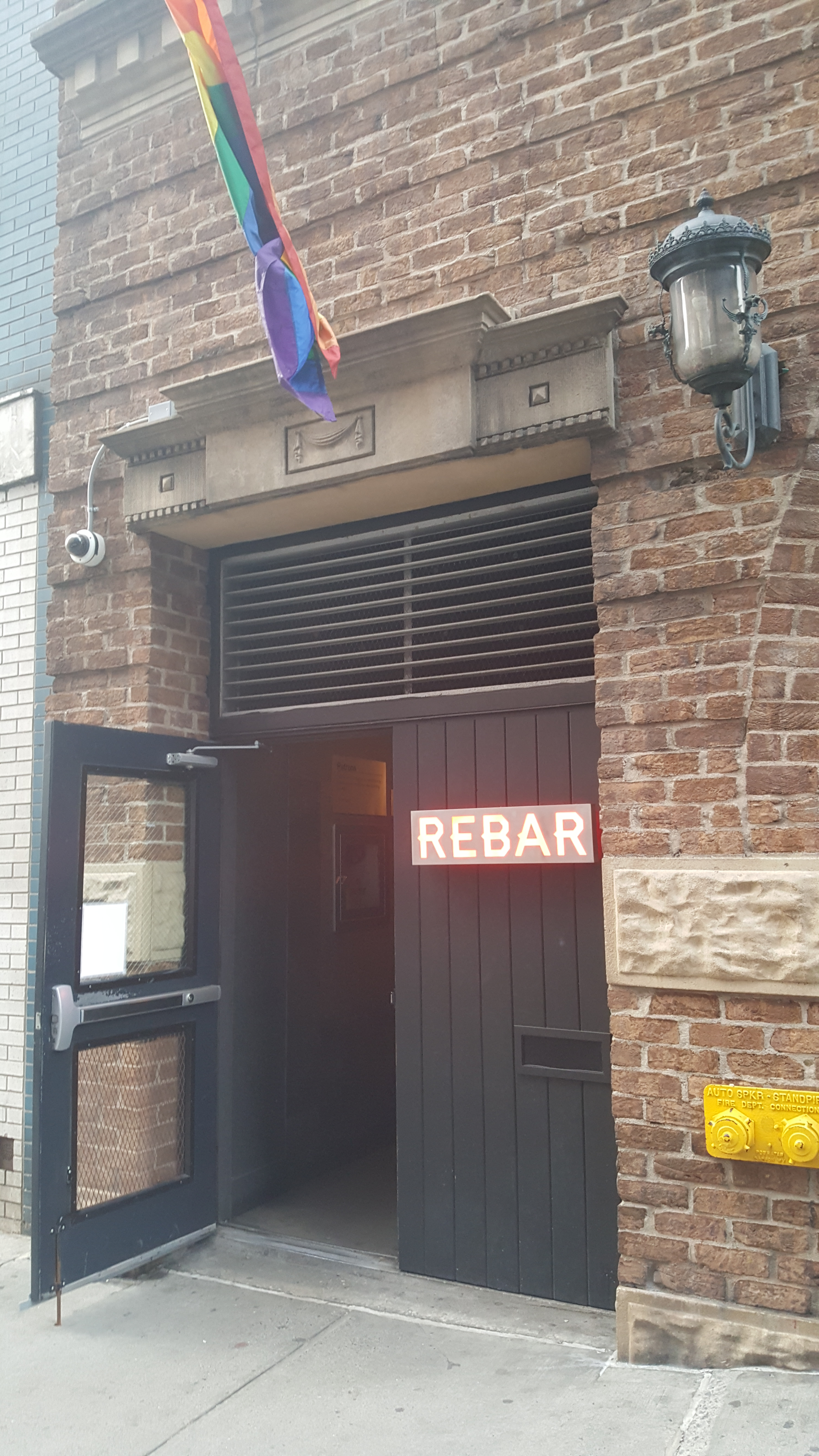
- Exterior of Rebar in 2020
- Interactive map of Rebar
- Address: 225 West 19th Street; New York City
- Location: Chelsea, Manhattan
- Coordinates: 40.7422875°N 73.9983765°W
- Owner: Frank DiLuzio
- Type: Gay bar; nightclub
- Public transit: 18th Street station

Construction
- Opened: 2017

Rebar, or ReBar, is a gay bar and nightclub in the Chelsea neighborhood of Manhattan in New York City.

== Description and history ==
The bar was established in 2017. One of the co-owners is Frank DiLuzio. In 2017, the bar faced allegations of discrimination by people of color. In 2024, the bar was taken over by a group that included Juan Boria.

In their list of "The 16 Best LGBTQ Bars in New York City" for Thrillist, Melissa Kravitz and Kyler Alvord wrote, "In 2017, REBAR opened where the famed G Lounge once stood, aiming to revive the Chelsea scene. It's still relatively new, but a few things are certain: the layout’s sharp, the staff's sizzling, and the vibe's sexiest when the space fills up during weekend dance parties."

== See also ==
- LGBT culture in New York City
