= 1 (New York City Subway service) =

Rapid transit service

- Broadway-Seventh Avenue Local

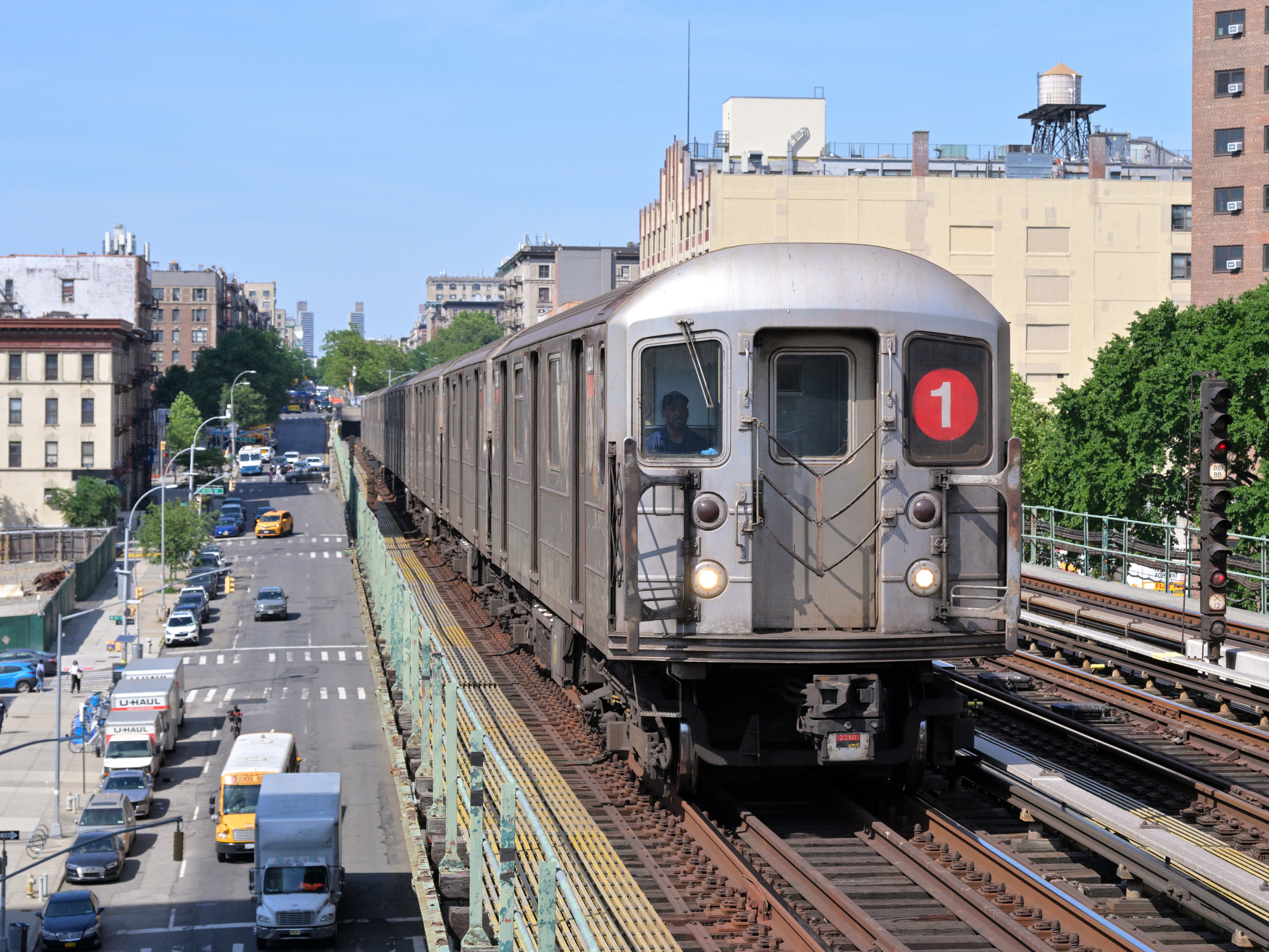
- South Ferry-bound 1 train consisting of R62As approaching 125th Street

- Northern end: Van Cortlandt Park–242nd Street
- Southern end: South Ferry
- Length: 14.7 mi (23.7 km)
- Stations: 38
- Rolling stock: R62A (Rolling stock assignments subject to change)
- Depot: 240th Street Yard
- Started service: October 27, 1904; 122 years ago

The 1 Broadway-Seventh Avenue Local is a rapid transit service in the A Division of the New York City Subway. Its route emblem, or "bullet", is colored red, since it uses the Interborough Rapid Transit Company's (IRT) Broadway–Seventh Avenue Line.

The 1 operates 24 hours daily between Van Cortlandt Park–242nd Street in Riverdale, Bronx and South Ferry in Lower Manhattan, making all stops along the full route.

The modern 1 train has always run up to Van Cortlandt Park in the Bronx, but its route below 96th Street has varied through the years. Initially, there were two main service patterns south of 96th Street: a local service to South Ferry in Manhattan, and an express service to Brooklyn. The express service was discontinued in 1959. From 1989 to 2005, the 1 ran in a skip-stop service pattern during rush hours, with the 9 providing the complementary skip-stop service on the same route. The 1 and 9 trains were rerouted after the September 11 attacks in 2001; although they had mostly resumed their normal route by 2002, the 1 train skipped the Cortlandt Street station until 2018.

== Service history ==
=== Early service ===
When the New York City Subway began operation between 1904 and 1908, one of the main service patterns was the West Side Branch, which the modern 1 train uses. Trains ran from Lower Manhattan to the 242nd Street station near Van Cortlandt Park, using what is now the IRT Lexington Avenue Line, 42nd Street Shuttle, and IRT Broadway–Seventh Avenue Line. There was both local and express service with express trains using the express tracks south of 96th Street. Some express trains ran to Atlantic Avenue in Brooklyn via the Joralemon Street Tunnel during rush hours while all other trains terminated at City Hall or the South Ferry outer loop.

On November 15, 1906, a petition with 20,000 signatures was sent to the Rapid Transit Commission to request the restoration of express service on the third track north of 96th Street. Residents of Inwood, Marble Hill, and Kingsbridge joined Washington Heights residents in requesting this service to speed their commutes. After receiving that petition, on November 16, the Rapid Transit Commission ordered the Interborough Rapid Transit Company (IRT) to extend express service from 96th Street to 137th Street in three days. Limited express service was inaugurated on November 19, 1906, operating daily, except Sundays and holidays, between 7:20 and 8:58 a.m. and 4:54 and 6:18 p.m. to and from 181st Street. Only expresses starting and ending at Kingsbridge would run express in this section; expresses from 168th Street would make local stops in this section. The Kingsbridge express trains would have two red signal markers on the top of the front motor car and a red lantern carried on the front end of the train on the center of the car platform. The previous schedule had local and express trains both running every four minutes south of Kingsbridge, while the new schedule had express trains running every eight minutes on the express track north of 96th Street, and local trains running every eight minutes. The number of local trains south of 96th Street did not change, with half of express trains becoming locals at this point. Waits at local stations north of 96th Street were ten minutes. In December 1906, the IRT prepared plans to relieve overcrowding on the platforms at 96th Street and train congestion at the station. To reduce the significant number of people transferring between people taking Lenox Avenue Line locals and Broadway express trains, the IRT planned to have Broadway express trains pass through the station without stopping. This would force people wanting to take Lenox Avenue Line trains to do so further down the line without needing to transfer, allowing trains to move through 96th Street more quickly.

In 1906, some of the local trains that started at 168th Street in the morning bypassed 157th Street without stopping.

On January 23, 1911, ten-car express trains began running on the Lenox Avenue Line, and the following day, ten-car express trains were inaugurated on the West Side Line.

On June 3, 1917, the first portion of the Broadway–Seventh Avenue Line south of Times Square–42nd Street (to 34th Street–Penn Station) opened. A separate shuttle service between Times Square and 34th Street was placed into service as well. On July 1, 1918, this shuttle was extended south to South Ferry, with a shorter shuttle on the Brooklyn branch between Chambers Street and Wall Street. Finally, the new "H" system was implemented on August 1, 1918, joining the two halves of the Broadway–Seventh Avenue Line and sending all West Side trains south from Times Square. Local trains (Broadway and Lenox Avenue) were sent to South Ferry, while express trains (Broadway and West Farms) used the new Clark Street Tunnel to Brooklyn.

On January 16, 1928, the New York State Transit Commission announced that it had reached an agreement with the IRT to increase service on its lines by 8,000,000 car miles a year; the greatest increase since 1922. As part of the changes, on January 30, all 242nd Street trains started running to New Lots Avenue. This change eliminated the splitting of trains at Brooklyn Museum, with the first half going to New Lots Avenue and the second half to Flatbush Avenue. In addition, the span of rush hour service on both Broadway–Seventh Avenue locals and expresses was increased.

On January 25, 1931, the start time for southbound split train operation was changed from 1 p.m. to 9 a.m. passing Franklin Avenue in order to increase the frequency of service to Flatbush Avenue and New Lots Avenue from every sixteen minutes to every eight minutes.

As of 1934, all express 1 trains were running from 242nd Street to New Lots Avenue weekdays and Saturdays during the day, alternating between New Lots and Flatbush Avenues evenings and Sunday afternoons, and were split at Brooklyn Museum on Sunday morning with the first half going to New Lots Avenue and the second half to Flatbush Avenue. All local 1 trains ran from 137th Street (extended to Dyckman Street during rush hours) to South Ferry days and evenings, and 242nd Street to either New Lots or Flatbush Avenues during late nights (from midnight to 5:30 a.m.).

On September 5, 1937, the practice of splitting Sunday morning trains at Brooklyn Museum was discontinued, with the alternate trains going to New Lots Avenue or Flatbush Avenue. Trains were cut from being 10-car trains to 7-car trains. On July 1, 1938, all evening and Sunday trains were rerouted to New Lots Avenue. By 1945, all local 1 trains were cut back from Dyckman Street to 137th Street during peak periods.

Beginning on May 10, 1946, all 1 trains in Brooklyn ran express during late nights, with service running every twelve minutes. Previously all 1 trains ran local from 12:30 to 5:30 a.m. and they alternated between Flatbush and New Lots Avenues. On December 20, 1946, all late night trains were routed to Flatbush Avenue, while Sunday service still alternated between Flatbush and New Lots Avenues.

The IRT routes were given numbered designations with the introduction of "R-type" rolling stock, which contained rollsigns with numbered designations for each service. The first such fleet, the R12, was put into service in 1948. The Broadway route became known as the 1.

On June 12, 1949, 137th Street to South Ferry Sunday local trains were discontinued, but were resumed on March 5, 1950, at which time Sunday service was also rerouted to New Lots Avenue. On March 15, 1954, weekend 137th Street to South Ferry local trains were once again discontinued, and simultaneously weekend Brooklyn trains were rerouted to Flatbush Avenue.

An attempt was made to extend express service further north on January 14, 1955, when Broadway express trains, or every other 1 train, began running express between 137th and 96th Streets in the peak direction, between 7:32 and 8:33 a.m. and between 5:10 and 5:59 p.m.. Express trains terminated at 242nd Street.

On January 17, 1955, the bottleneck at 96th Street forced some southbound 1 trains that ran express south of 96th Street to remain on the local track at 96th Street, skipping local stops before switching to the express track at 72nd Street.

Broadway express service between 137th and 96th Street proved unsuccessful, and ended on June 28, 1956. Meanwhile, in Brooklyn, weekday trains were rerouted to Flatbush Avenue and evening 137th Street to South Ferry local trains were discontinued.

=== West Side improvement ===
Under a $100-million rebuilding program, increased and lengthened service was implemented during peak hours on the 1 train. Trains then stopped using the switches north of 96th Street, except for General Orders, when temporary construction-related service diversions were in effect. Once most of the work on the project was completed on February 6, 1959, all 1 trains became local, running at an increased frequency, and all 2 and 3 trains became express, and eight-car local trains began operation. 1 trains began to run between 242nd Street and South Ferry at all times. Trains began to be branded as Hi-Speed Locals, being as fast as the old express service with new R21 and R22 subway cars on the route. During rush hours in the peak direction, alternate trains from 242nd Street only stopped at 168th Street while running express from Dyckman to 137th Streets in the direction of heavy traffic. The bypassed stations were served by locals originating from Dyckman Street. By May 26, 1959, 15,000 riders switched from using express trains to the Hi-Speed Locals during rush hours, increasing riders on local trains south of 96th Street by 75 percent.

Evening rush local/express service was discontinued on February 2, 1959. Morning rush hour express service was revised on January 8, 1962, with express trains stopping at 191st Street and 181st Street, and skipping 215th Street and 207th Street. This express service was discontinued on May 24, 1976, after which all 1 trains began to make all stops.

=== Skip-stop implementation ===
In April 1988, the New York City Transit Authority (NYCTA) unveiled plans to speed up service on the Broadway-Seventh Avenue Line through the implementation of skip-stop service. As soon as the plan was announced, some local officials were opposed to the change. Initially, skip-stop service would have been operated north of 116th Street, with the 1 service skipping 125th Street, 157th Street, 207th Street, and 225th Street, and a new 9 service skipping 145th Street, 181st Street, Dyckman Street, 215th Street and 238th Street. As part of the study that resulted in the skip-stop plan, the NYCTA studied using the center track for express service. However, the agency settled on skip-stop service because the center track existed in two discontinuous segments, which would require complicated track-switching maneuvers to accommodate the express trains. Most passengers would not have to wait longer for a train: previously, one-third of 1 trains had terminated at 137th Street, but under the new service pattern these trains would run the full route to 242nd Street instead. Previously, stations north of 137th Street were served by a train every 10 minutes. At stations served by only one of the skip-stop services, the maximum wait was to be 10 minutes, while at stations served by all trains, the maximum wait would be 5 minutes. Skip-stop trains would not speed through stations, instead passing through skipped stops at 15 mph (24 km/h); the maximum allowed per NYCTA rules.

In July 1988, it was announced that the 1/9 skip-stop service would begin on August 29, 1988. Skip-stop service was expected to speed up travel times for almost half of riders north of 96th Street. In August 1988, the NYCTA postponed plans for 1/9 skip-stop service due to public opposition. NYCTA officials recognized that they did not do a good job informing the community, and indicated that they planned to continue to look into it. Plans to implement skip-stop service on the IRT Pelham Line (6 and <6> trains), which were contingent on the success of 1/9 skip-stop, were indefinitely postponed. In September 1988, the MTA Board formally voted to defer implementation of 1/9 skip-stop service for these reasons. NYCTA planned to initiate outreach in January 1989 and implement the change at some point later that year. In October 1988, the NYCTA informed local communities that it planned to implement skip-stop the following spring. However, residents of Inwood and Washington Heights were particularly opposed to the change, since most stops in these neighborhoods would be skipped by one of the two routes, and since they had not been included in the planning process.

In March 1989, the NYCTA stated that there was no set date for the implementation of the plan, with service possibly starting as late as the fall. To convince local communities, it set up meetings with residents and distributed leaflets advertising the change. In attempt to win their favor, they changed the name of the service from skip-stop to express service.

A public hearing on the NYCTA's plan for skip-stop service was held on June 27, 1989. The goals of skip-stop service were to extend all trips to 242nd Street, to provide faster travel times for a majority of riders, and to improve service reliability through evenly loaded and spaced trains. During 1987 and 1988, analysis was conducted to determine various options for express service along the 1, including using the center express track. As part of the plan, express service was to operate weekdays between 6:30 a.m. and 7 p.m. Trips that ended at 137th Street were extended to 242nd Street, which eliminated the need for a significant reduction in service levels at local stops. The 125th Street station, which is located south of 137th Street, would have experienced a reduction in service. The location of all-stop stations and skip-stop stations was done to evenly distribute passengers between the 1 and the 9, and to accommodate reverse commuting patterns. Stops with ridership greater than 8,000 daily passengers were designated all-stop stations, while less patronized stops were served by either 1 or 9 trains. One change was made from the 1988 plan: due to community input 181st Street was added as an all-stop station. Express service was expected to save up to 2 1/2 minutes of travel time, while all-stop stations would see an additional 2 1/2-minute reduction in waiting time. This would save between six and nine minutes or a 19% travel time reduction. Running express service via the center track was dismissed since the track had not been designed for express service. The track south of 145th Street is not long enough to allow an express train to pass a local, resulting in merging delays at 103rd Street which would eliminate any time saved. In addition, the busiest stops on the route north of 96th Street would be bypassed without any time savings. Extending all-local service to 242nd Street or adding additional trains were dismissed since they would require additional subway cars, which were not available at the time.

On July 28, 1989, the MTA Board approved a revised 1/9 skip-stop plan unanimously, with the plan scheduled to take effect on August 21, 1989. Unlike the original plan, 1 trains would skip 145th Street, 191st Street, 207th Street and 225th Street, while 9 trains would skip 157th Street, Dyckman Street, 215th Street and 238th Street.

Beginning at 6:30 a.m. on Monday, August 21, 1989, the services were coordinated as the 1/9 and both ran between Van Cortlandt Park–242nd Street and South Ferry. The plan was to have skip-stop service begin north of 116th Street–Columbia University, but due to objections, most notably that riders did not want 125th Street to be a skip-stop station, skip-stop service was only implemented north of 137th Street–City College between the hours of 6:30 a.m. and 7:00 p.m. weekdays. All 1 trains skipped Marble Hill–225th, 207th, 191st and 145th Streets, while all 9 trains skipped 238th, 215th, Dyckman and 157th Streets. On September 4, 1994, midday skip-stop service was discontinued, and 191st Street became a common station for skip-stop service.

=== 2000s to present ===
==== 9/11 and recovery ====
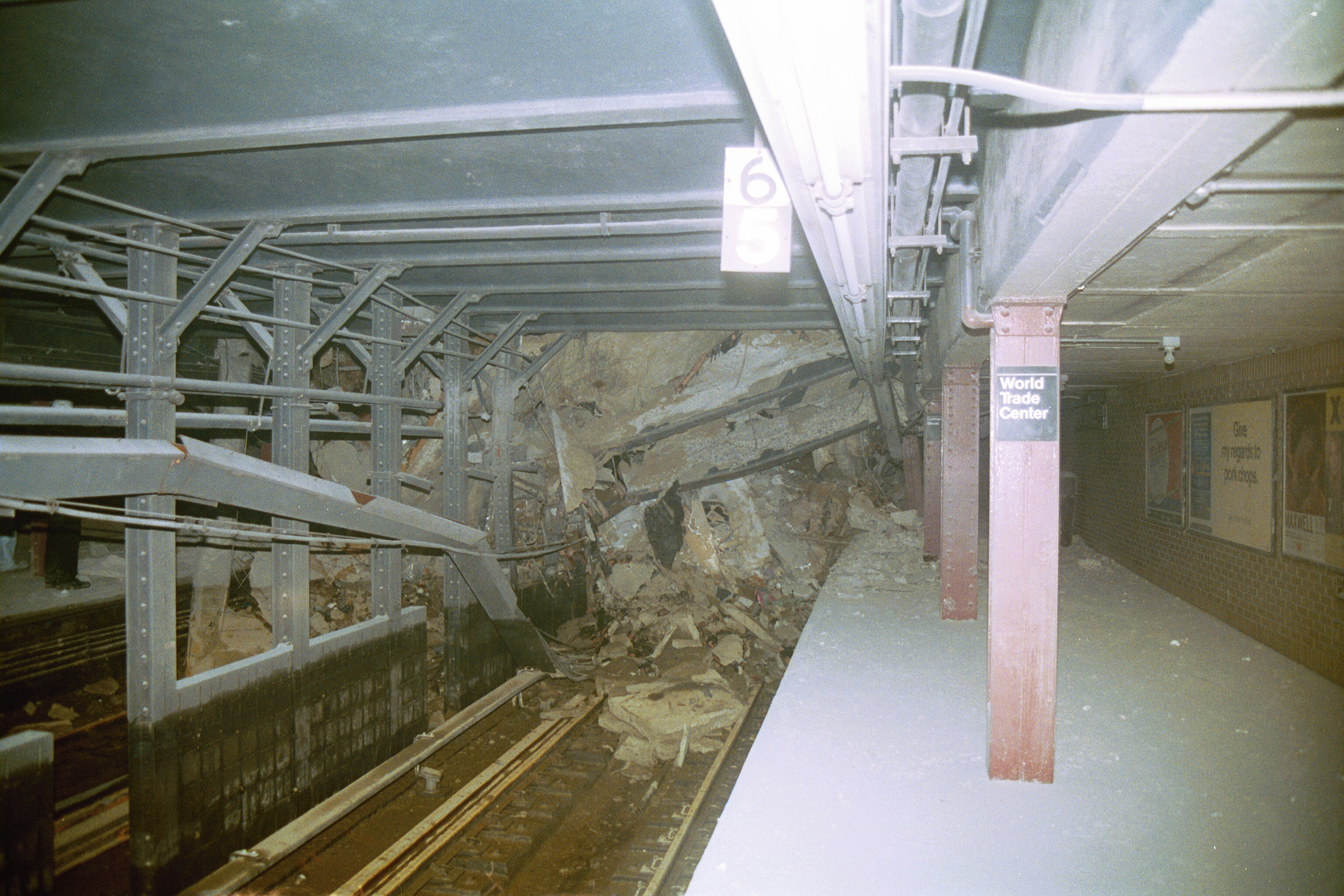
Cortlandt Street in ruins following the collapse of the Twin Towers on 9/11.

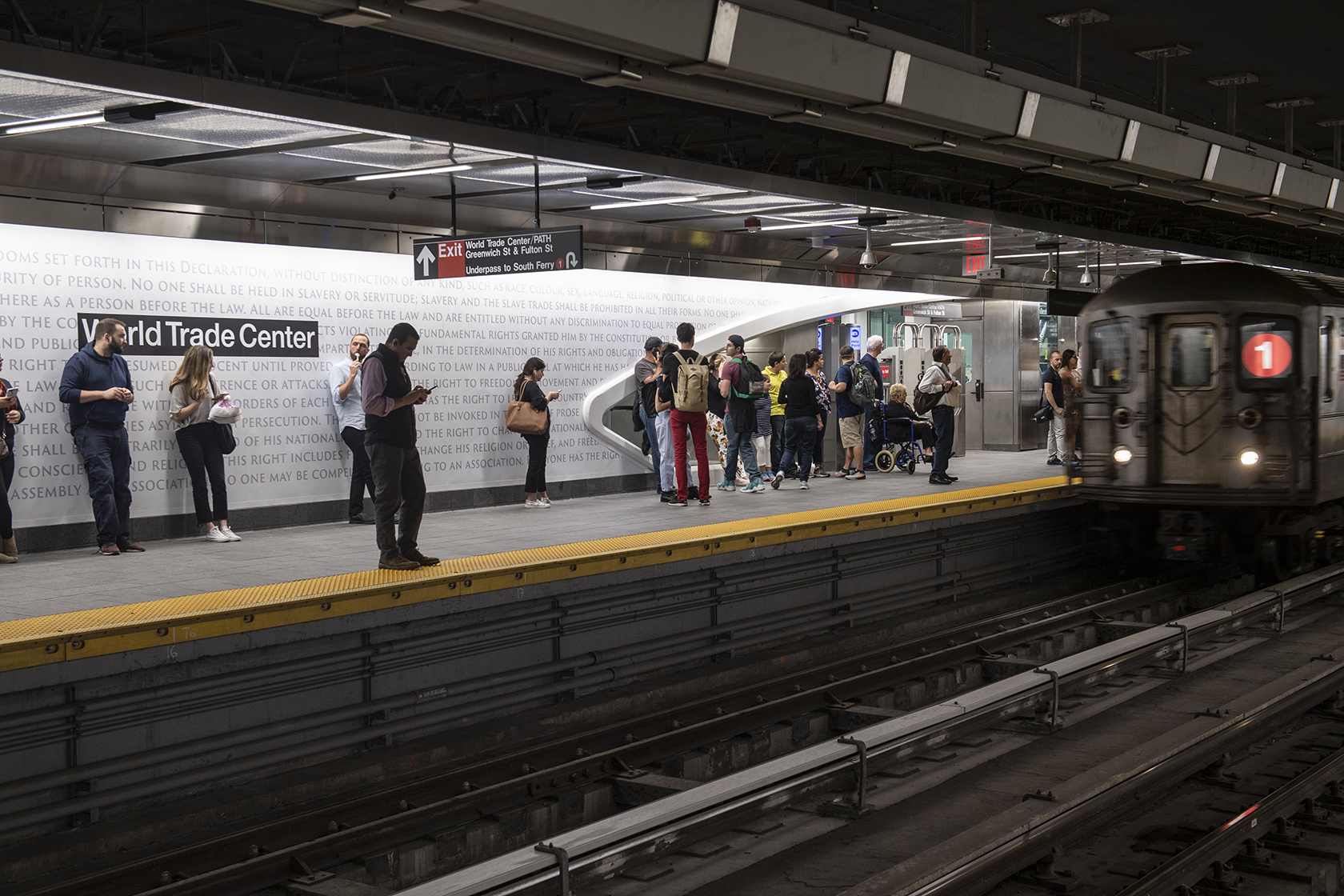
The station now known as WTC Cortlandt in 2018, just days after reopening.

After the September 11 attacks in 2001, the 9 and skip-stop services were suspended, and the 1 was initially cut back from South Ferry to Times Square–42nd Street. Service was quickly restored to as far as 34th Street–Penn Station on the evening of September 12. Flooding and debris south of 34th Street prevented the 1 train from operating along its normal route, as the line south of Chambers Street ran directly under the World Trade Center site and was heavily damaged in the collapse of the Twin Towers. On September 17, 1 trains operated only between 242nd Street and 14th Street and made all stops between 242nd and 96th Streets and express stops between 96th and 14th Streets. Local service south of 14th Street was replaced by the 2 and 3 trains, which skipped all stops between Canal and Fulton Streets due to debris on the streets around those stations. On September 19, after a few switching delays at 96th Street, 1 trains began to operate between 242nd Street in the Bronx and New Lots Avenue in Brooklyn during daytime hours via the Clark Street Tunnel and the Eastern Parkway Line to replace the 3 in Brooklyn, which got cut back to 14th Street during this period. Overnight service short turned at Chambers Street and did not operate to or from New Lots Avenue. Franklin Street reopened on September 18, Chambers Street reopened on September 26, and Park Place reopened on October 28. Limited a.m. rush hour service terminated at Flatbush Avenue instead of New Lots Avenue.

Over the next year, the section of the Broadway–Seventh Avenue Line's South Ferry spur south of Chambers Street was cleaned and the tunnel was rebuilt through the World Trade Center site. The tunnel was completed and opened to service on September 15, 2002, when 1 trains returned to the South Ferry Loop and 9 skip-stop service was reinstated. However, the Cortlandt Street station, which was directly underneath the World Trade Center, was demolished as part of the clean-up and was rebuilt as part of the World Trade Center Transportation Hub until September 8, 2018, when it reopened as WTC Cortlandt.

==== Elimination of the 9 train and skip stop service ====
On April 27, 2004, it was announced that New York City Transit was considering eliminating 9 service, and thus, the skip-stop pattern. By that time, riders at skip-stop stations were experiencing longer wait times, and fewer riders were benefiting from the service pattern overall. The MTA estimated that eliminating skip-stop service only added 2 1/2 to 3 minutes of travel time for passengers at the northernmost stations at 242nd Street and 238th Street, while many passengers would see trains frequencies double, resulting in decreased overall travel time because of less time waiting for trains. Though the MTA had planned to vote on the future of the skip-stop service in summer 2004, it approved the change on January 11, 2005. The 9 train was discontinued on May 27, 2005, and the 1 now makes all stops on the full route.

==== Other changes ====
On March 16, 2009, the new South Ferry station opened, replacing the original loop station. However, 1 service was altered after Hurricane Sandy disrupted service around the transit system in 2012. The hurricane flooded the new station and caused major damage, requiring it to be closed for repairs. 1 service was suspended entirely on the evening of October 28, but was restored on the morning of October 31; the 1 was initially cut back from South Ferry to 34th Street–Penn Station; service was restored to 14th Street on November 3, to Chambers Street on November 5, and then to Rector Street on November 12. Rector Street served as a temporary terminal for the 1 until April 5, 2013, when the old South Ferry loop station reopened on that day in the early morning. The old loop station then served as a temporary terminal until the replacement South Ferry station reopened on June 27, 2017. In August 2023, weekend frequencies on the 1 were increased from eight minutes to six minutes. Effective on December 15, 2024, two evening p.m. trains started terminating at 215th Street.

== Route ==
=== Signage history ===
The pre-1967 bullet used on the R12s to R36s

1967-1979 bullet

The current bullet used since 1979

=== Service pattern ===
The 1 uses the following line with the same service pattern at all times.

Line	From	To	Tracks
IRT Broadway–Seventh Avenue Line	Van Cortlandt Park–242nd Street	207th Street	local
IRT Broadway–Seventh Avenue Line	Dyckman Street	157th Street	all
IRT Broadway–Seventh Avenue Line	145th Street	Chambers Street	local
IRT Broadway–Seventh Avenue Line	WTC Cortlandt	South Ferry	all

=== Stations ===
The 1 runs on the IRT Broadway–Seventh Avenue Line in its entirety.

Station service legend
Stops all times	Stops 24 hours a day
Stops all times except late nights	Stops every day during daytime hours only
Stops late nights only	Stops every day during overnight hours only
Stops weekdays during the day	Stops during weekday daytime hours only
Stops rush hours in the peak direction only	Stops weekdays in the peak direction only
Station closed	Station closed
Time period details
Disabled access	Station is compliant with the Americans with Disabilities Act
↑	Station is compliant with the Americans with Disabilities Act in the indicated direction only
↓	Station is compliant with the Americans with Disabilities Act in the indicated direction only
	Elevator access to mezzanine only

1 service	Stations	Disabled access	Subway transfers	Connections and notes
The Bronx
Stops all times	Van Cortlandt Park–242nd Street			
Stops all times	238th Street			Some southbound trains originate at this station during rush hours.
Stops all times	231st Street	Disabled access		
Manhattan
Stops all times	Marble Hill–225th Street			Metro-North Hudson Line at Marble Hill
Stops all times	215th Street			Northern terminal for some northbound a.m. rush hour and evening trains (Note: Some northbound 1 trains terminate at this station during the a.m. rush hour and evening)
Stops all times	207th Street			Bx12 Select Bus Service
Stops all times	Dyckman Street	Disabled access		
Stops all times	191st Street	Elevator access to mezzanine only		
Stops all times	181st Street	Elevator access to mezzanine only		George Washington Bridge Bus Terminal
Stops all times	168th Street	Elevator access to mezzanine only	A C (IND Eighth Avenue Line)	
Stops all times	157th Street			Bx6 Select Bus Service
Stops all times	145th Street			
Stops all times	137th Street–City College	Disabled access		Northern terminal for some a.m. rush hour trains
Stops all times	125th Street			
Stops all times	116th Street–Columbia University			M60 Select Bus Service to LaGuardia Airport
Stops all times	Cathedral Parkway–110th Street			
Stops all times	103rd Street			
Stops all times	96th Street	Disabled access	2 3	
Stops all times	86th Street		2	M86 Select Bus Service
Stops all times	79th Street		2	M79 Select Bus Service
Stops all times	72nd Street	Disabled access	2 3	
Stops all times	66th Street–Lincoln Center	Disabled access	2	
Stops all times	59th Street–Columbus Circle	Disabled access	2 A B C D (IND Eighth Avenue Line)	
Stops all times	50th Street		2	
Stops all times	Times Square–42nd Street	Disabled access	2 3; 7 <7> (IRT Flushing Line); A C E (IND Eighth Avenue Line at 42nd Street–Port Authority Bus Terminal); N Q R W (BMT Broadway Line); S (42nd Street Shuttle); B D F <F> M (IND Sixth Avenue Line at 42nd Street–Bryant Park, daytime only)	Port Authority Bus Terminal; M34A Select Bus Service
Stops all times	34th Street–Penn Station	Disabled access	2 3	M34 / M34A Select Bus Service; Amtrak, LIRR, and NJ Transit at Pennsylvania Station
Stops all times	28th Street		2	
Stops all times	23rd Street		2	M23 Select Bus Service
Stops all times	18th Street		2	
Stops all times	14th Street	Disabled access	2 3 F <F> M (IND Sixth Avenue Line at 14th Street); L (BMT Canarsie Line at Sixth Avenue)	PATH at 14th Street; M14A/D Select Bus Service
Stops all times	Christopher Street–Stonewall		2	PATH at Christopher Street
Stops all times	Houston Street		2	
Stops all times	Canal Street		2	
Stops all times	Franklin Street		2	
Stops all times	Chambers Street	Disabled access	2 3	
Stops all times	WTC Cortlandt	Disabled access		PATH at World Trade Center
Stops all times	Rector Street			
Stops all times	South Ferry	Disabled access	N R W (BMT Broadway Line at Whitehall Street–South Ferry)	M15 Select Bus Service; Staten Island Ferry at Whitehall Terminal
