= 28th Street station (IRT Broadway–Seventh Avenue Line) =

New York City Subway station in Manhattan

28 Street
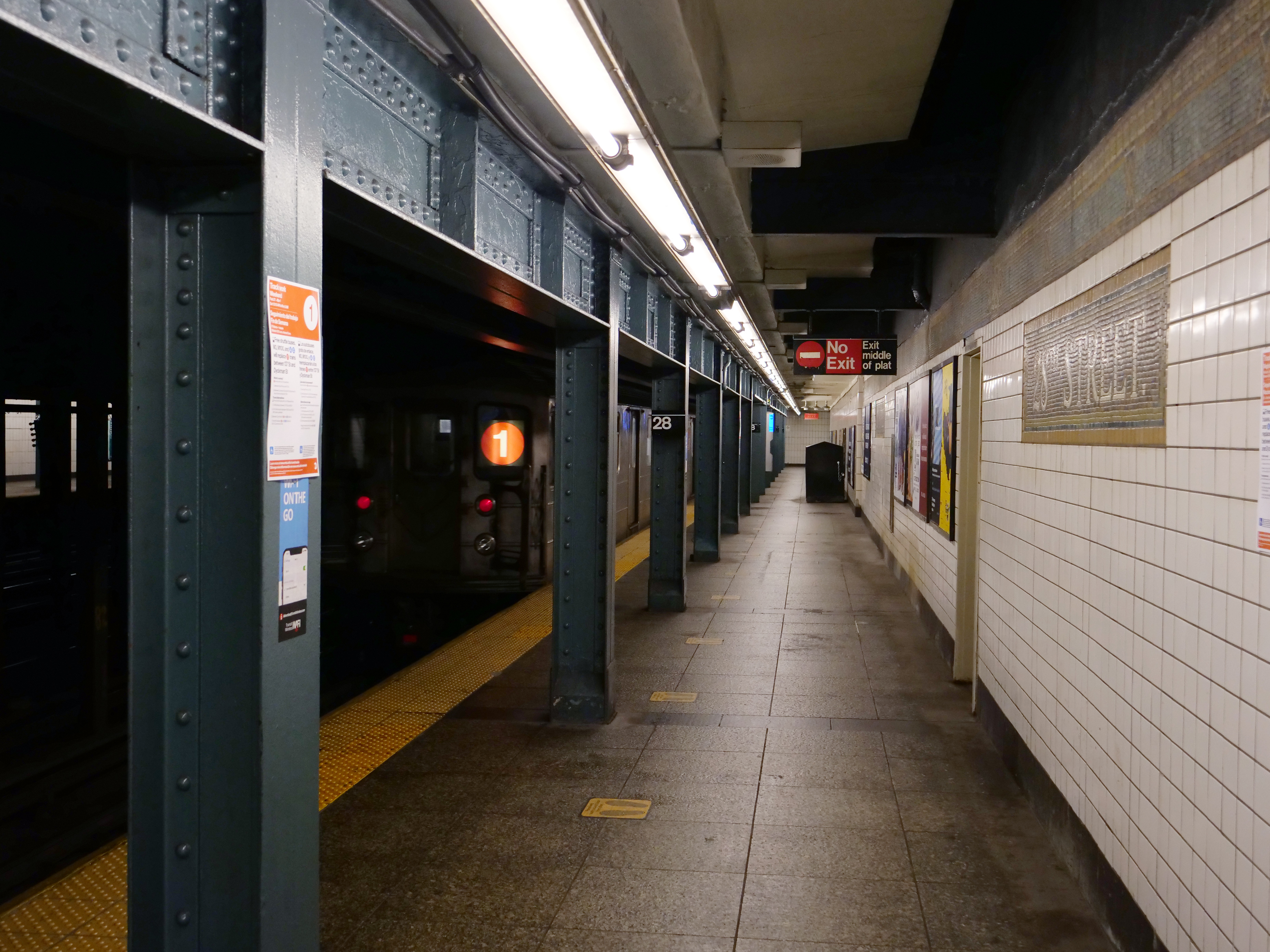
- Northbound 1 train departs

Station statistics
- Address: West 28th Street & Seventh Avenue; New York, New York
- Borough: Manhattan
- Locale: Chelsea, Flower District, Midtown
- Coordinates: 40.747°N 73.993°W
- Division: A (IRT)
- Line: IRT Broadway–Seventh Avenue Line
- Services: 1 (all times); 2 (late nights)
- Transit: NYCT Bus: M7, M20
- Structure: Underground
- Platforms: 2 side platforms
- Tracks: 4

Other information
- Opened: July 1, 1918; 108 years ago

Traffic
- 2025: 3,301,327 ▲6.4%
- Rank: 113 out of 423
Services
Preceding station	New York City Subway	Following station
34th Street–Penn Station 1 2 toward Van Cortlandt Park–242nd Street	Local	23rd Street 1 2 toward South Ferry
does not stop here
Location
Location within New York City Subway
Location within New York City
Location within New York
Track layout
Street map
Station service legend
Symbol	Description
Stops all times	Stops all times
Stops late nights only	Stops late nights only
Stops late nights and weekends	Stops late nights and weekends
- West 28th Street Subway Station (Dual System IRT)
- U.S. National Register of Historic Places
- New York State Register of Historic Places
- MPS: New York City Subway System MPS
- NRHP reference No.: 05000235
- NYSRHP No.: 06101.015696

Significant dates
- Added to NRHP: March 30, 2005
- Designated NYSRHP: December 18, 2004

The 28th Street station is a local station on the IRT Broadway–Seventh Avenue Line of the New York City Subway. Located at the intersection of 28th Street and Seventh Avenue in the Chelsea neighborhood of Manhattan, it is served by the 1 train at all times and by the 2 train during late nights.

The station was built by the Interborough Rapid Transit Company (IRT) as part of the Dual Contracts with New York City, and opened on July 1, 1918. The station had its platforms extended in the 1960s.

== History ==
=== Construction and opening ===
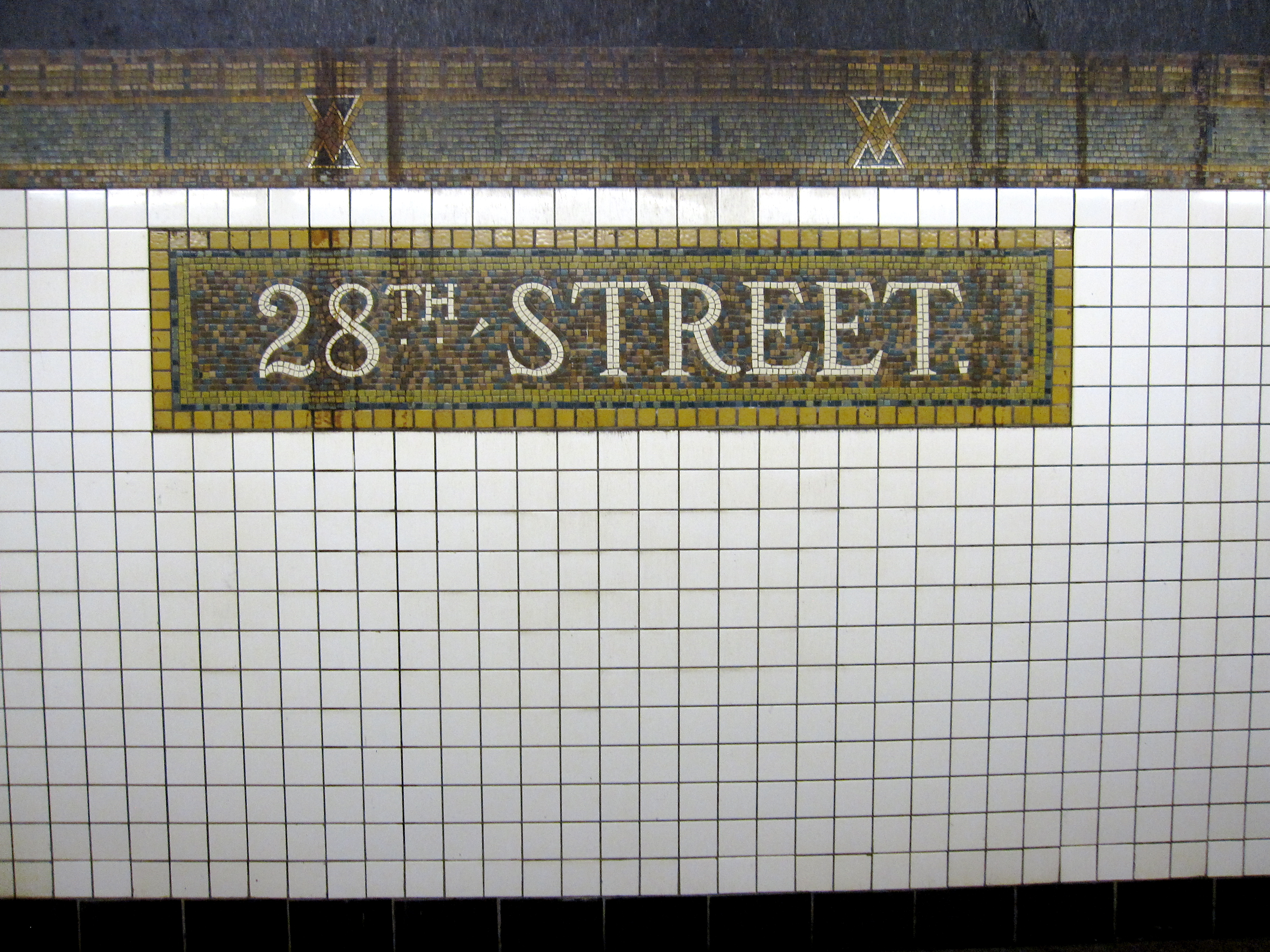
Name tablet

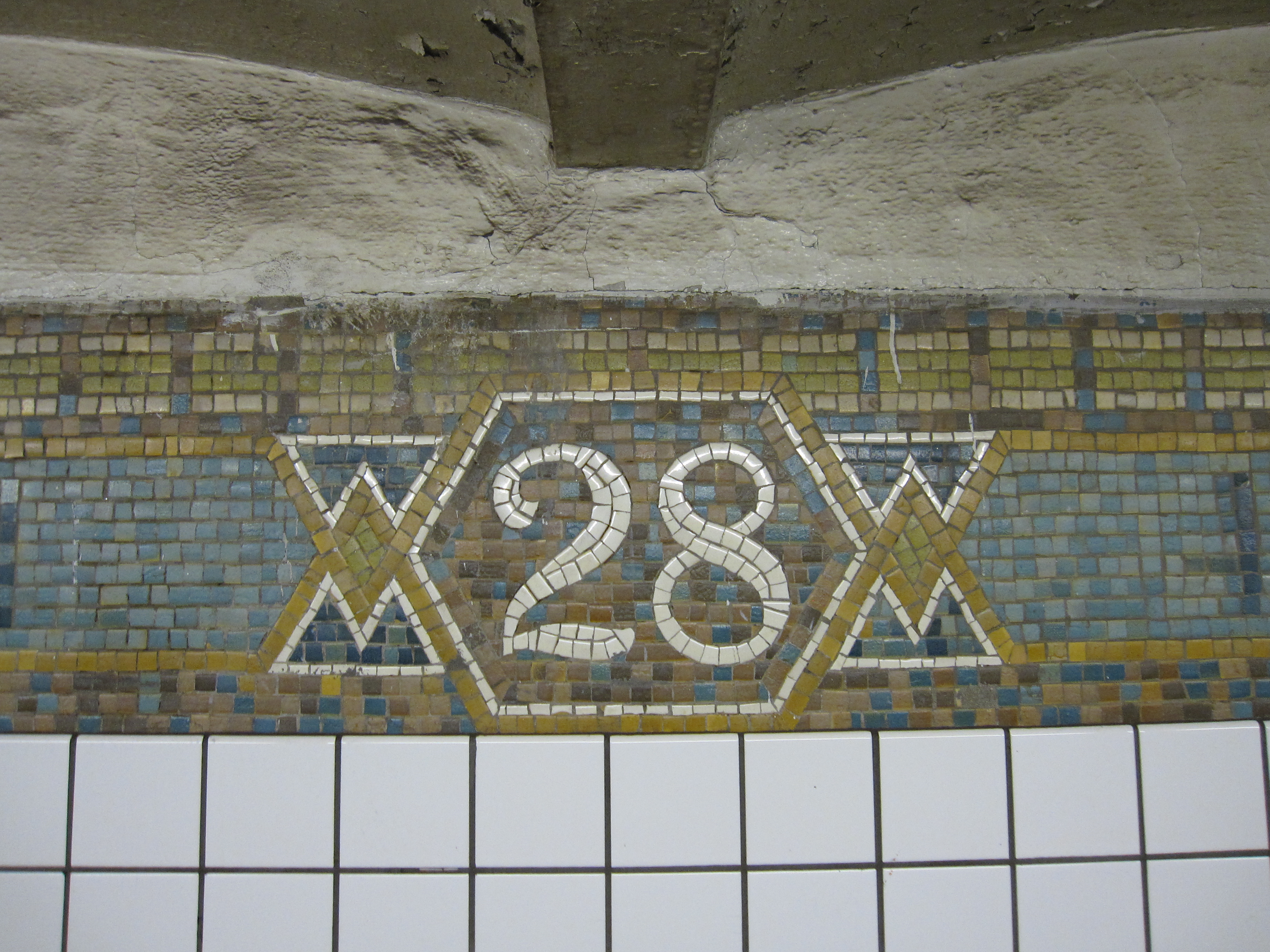
Trim line tablet

The Dual Contracts, which were signed on March 19, 1913, were contracts for the construction, rehabilitation and operation of rapid transit lines in the City of New York. The contracts were "dual" in that they were signed between the City and two separate private companies, the Interborough Rapid Transit Company (IRT) and the Brooklyn Rapid Transit Company (BRT), all working together to make the construction of the Dual Contracts possible. The Dual Contracts promised the construction of several lines in Brooklyn. As part of Contract 4, the IRT agreed to build a branch of the original subway line south down Seventh Avenue, Varick Street, and West Broadway to serve the West Side of Manhattan.

The construction of this line, in conjunction with the construction of the Lexington Avenue Line, would change the operations of the IRT system. Instead of having trains go via Broadway, turning onto 42nd Street, before finally turning onto Park Avenue, there would be two trunk lines connected by the 42nd Street Shuttle. The system would be changed from looking like a "Z" system on a map to an "H" system. One trunk would run via the new Lexington Avenue Line down Park Avenue, and the other trunk would run via the new Seventh Avenue Line up Broadway. In order for the line to continue down Varick Street and West Broadway, these streets needed to be widened, and two new streets were built, the Seventh Avenue Extension and the Varick Street Extension. It was predicted that the subway extension would lead to the growth of the Lower West Side, and to neighborhoods such as Chelsea and Greenwich Village.

28th Street opened as part of an extension of the line from 34th Street–Penn Station to South Ferry on July 1, 1918. Initially, the station was served by a shuttle running from Times Square to South Ferry. The new "H" system was implemented on August 1, 1918, joining the two halves of the Broadway–Seventh Avenue Line and sending all West Side trains south from Times Square. An immediate result of the switch was the need to transfer using the 42nd Street Shuttle in order to retrace the original layout. The completion of the "H" system doubled the capacity of the IRT system.

=== Later years ===
The city government took over the IRT's operations on June 12, 1940. On August 9, 1964, the New York City Transit Authority (NYCTA) announced the letting of a $7.6 million contract to lengthen platforms at stations on the Broadway—Seventh Avenue Line from Rector Street to 34th Street–Penn Station, including 28th Street, and stations from Central Park North–110th Street to 145th Street on the Lenox Avenue Line to allow express trains to be lengthened from nine-car trains to ten-car trains, and to lengthen locals from eight-car trains to ten-car trains. With the completion of this project, the NYCTA project to lengthen IRT stations to accommodate ten-car trains would be complete.

The station was listed on the National Register of Historic Places on March 30, 2005. The southbound platform's Customer Assistance Booth was removed in 2010.

A small bar called La Noxe is next to one of the street staircases from the northbound platform. The bar first opened in October 2020, shuttered for three months due to the COVID-19 pandemic in New York City, and reopened in February 2021.

== Station layout ==
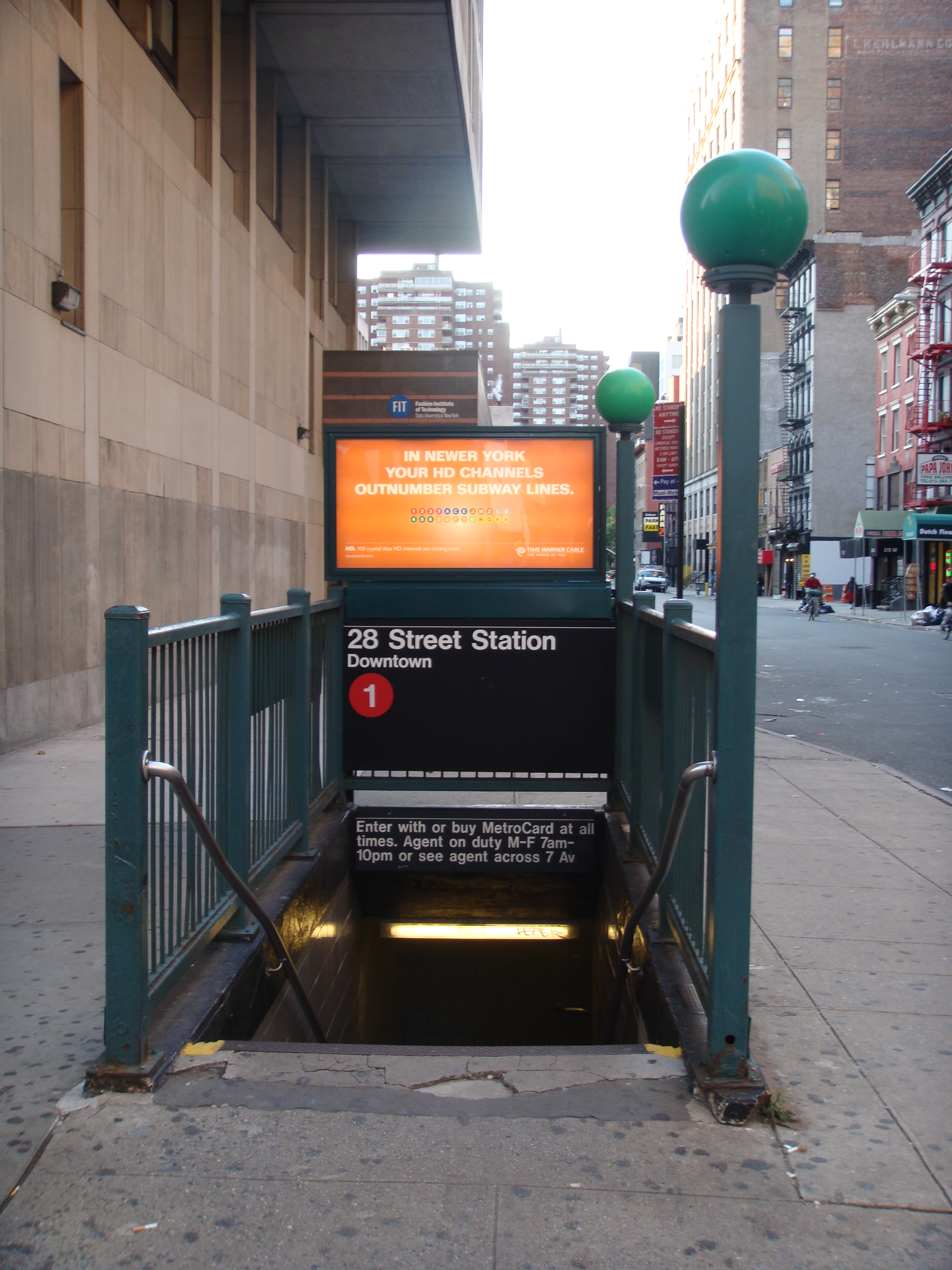
Southbound stair

This underground station has four tracks and two side platforms. The station is served by the 1 at all times and by the 2 during late nights; the center express tracks are used by the 2 and 3 trains during daytime hours. It is between 34th Street–Penn Station to the north and 23rd Street to the south.

Both platforms have their original mosaic trim line, name tablets, and directional signs. Vent chambers are present and there is a closed newsstand on the northbound platform as evidenced by sealed windows on the walls. Slate blue I-beam columns run along both platforms at regular intervals, alternating ones having the standard black station name plate with white lettering.

The station is built on a former wetland, making it especially vulnerable to flooding during heavy rains.

=== Exits ===
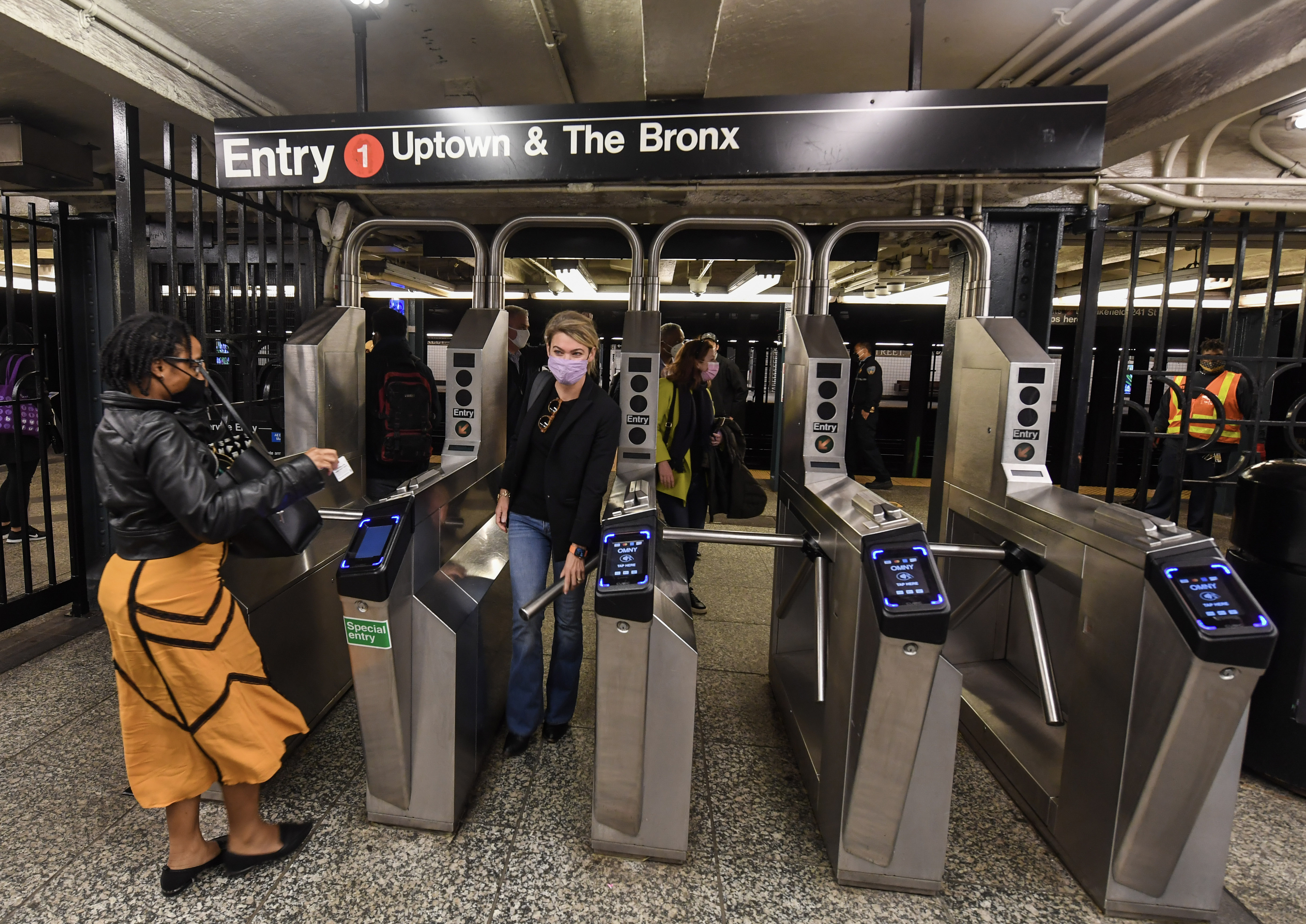
Fare control area at 28th Street on the uptown platform

All fare control areas are on platform level and there are no crossovers or crossunders. The main ones are at the centers of the platforms, at 28th Street. On the Bronx-bound platform, a turnstile bank leads to a mezzanine with a token booth and two staircases going up to either eastern corners of 28th Street and Seventh Avenue. On the southbound platform, a turnstile bank leads to an unstaffed mezzanine. Two staircases go up to either western corners of 28th Street and Seventh Avenue.

Both platforms have an exit-only at their extreme south ends, at 27th Street. A single exit-only turnstile from each platform leads to one staircase each going up to either northern corner of Seventh Avenue and 27th Street. The northwest-corner exit, from the southbound platform, is outside Fashion Institute of Technology. The northeast-corner exit is from the northbound platform.

== See also ==
- National Register of Historic Places listings in Manhattan from 14th to 59th Streets
