= 18th Street station (IRT Broadway–Seventh Avenue Line) =

New York City Subway station in Manhattan

18 Street
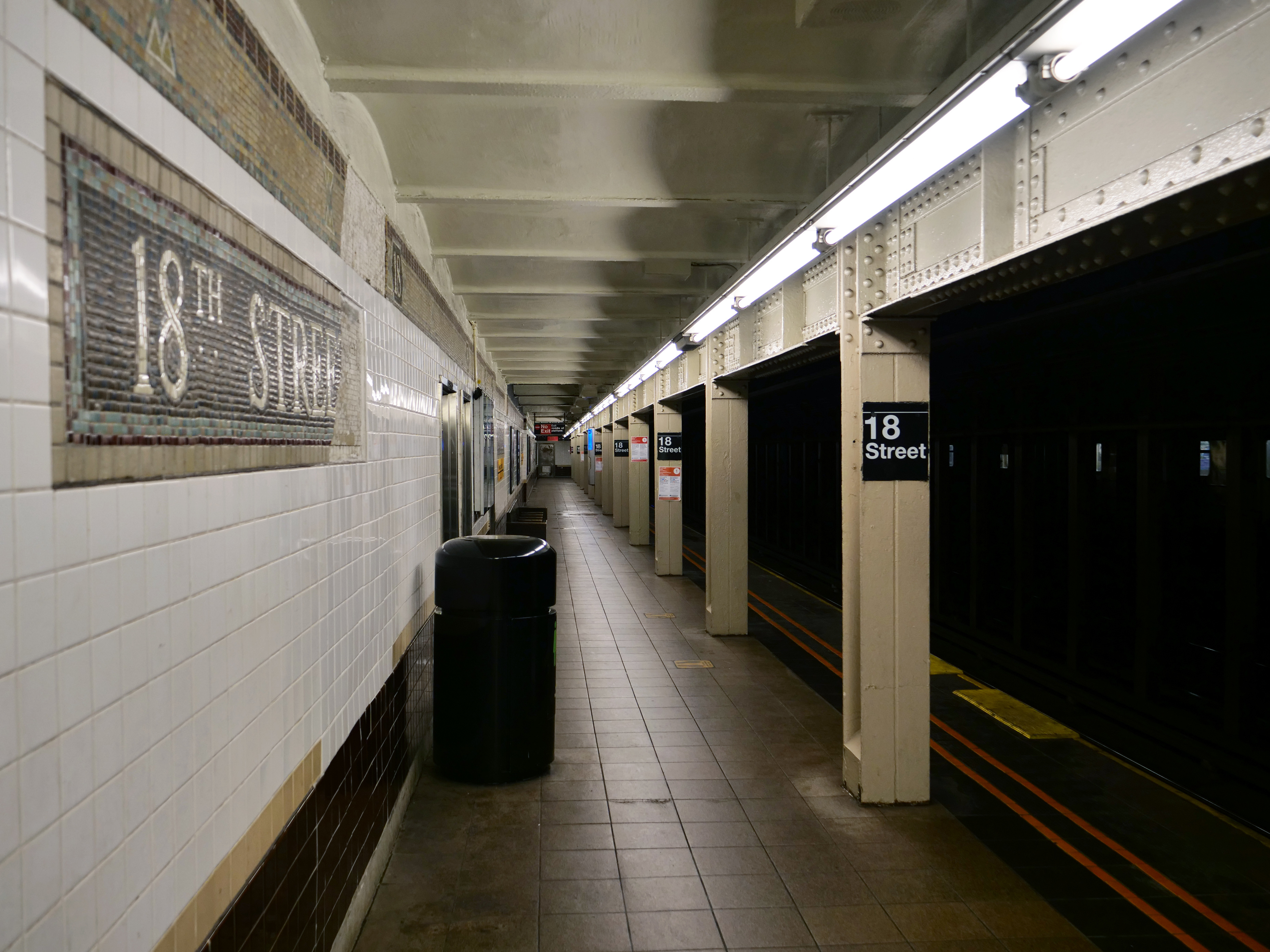
- Northbound platform

Station statistics
- Address: West 18th Street & Seventh Avenue; New York, New York
- Borough: Manhattan
- Locale: Chelsea
- Coordinates: 40.741°N 73.998°W
- Division: A (IRT)
- Line: IRT Broadway–Seventh Avenue Line
- Services: 1 (all times); 2 (late nights)
- Transit: NYCT Bus: M7, M20
- Structure: Underground
- Platforms: 2 side platforms
- Tracks: 4

Other information
- Opened: July 1, 1918; 108 years ago

Traffic
- 2025: 1,846,605 ▲3.3%
- Rank: 191 out of 423
Services
Preceding station	New York City Subway	Following station
23rd Street 1 2 toward Van Cortlandt Park–242nd Street	Local	14th Street 1 2 toward South Ferry
does not stop here
Location
Location within New York City Subway
Location within New York City
Location within New York
Track layout
Street map
Station service legend
Symbol	Description
Stops all times	Stops all times
Stops late nights only	Stops late nights only
Stops late nights and weekends	Stops late nights and weekends

The 18th Street station is a local station on the IRT Broadway–Seventh Avenue Line of the New York City Subway. Located at the intersection of 18th Street and Seventh Avenue in the Chelsea neighborhood of Manhattan, it is served by the 1 train at all times and by the 2 train during late nights.

The station was built by the Interborough Rapid Transit Company (IRT) as part of the Dual Contracts with New York City, and opened on July 1, 1918. The station had its platforms extended in the 1960s, and was renovated in the early 1990s.

== History ==
=== Construction and opening ===
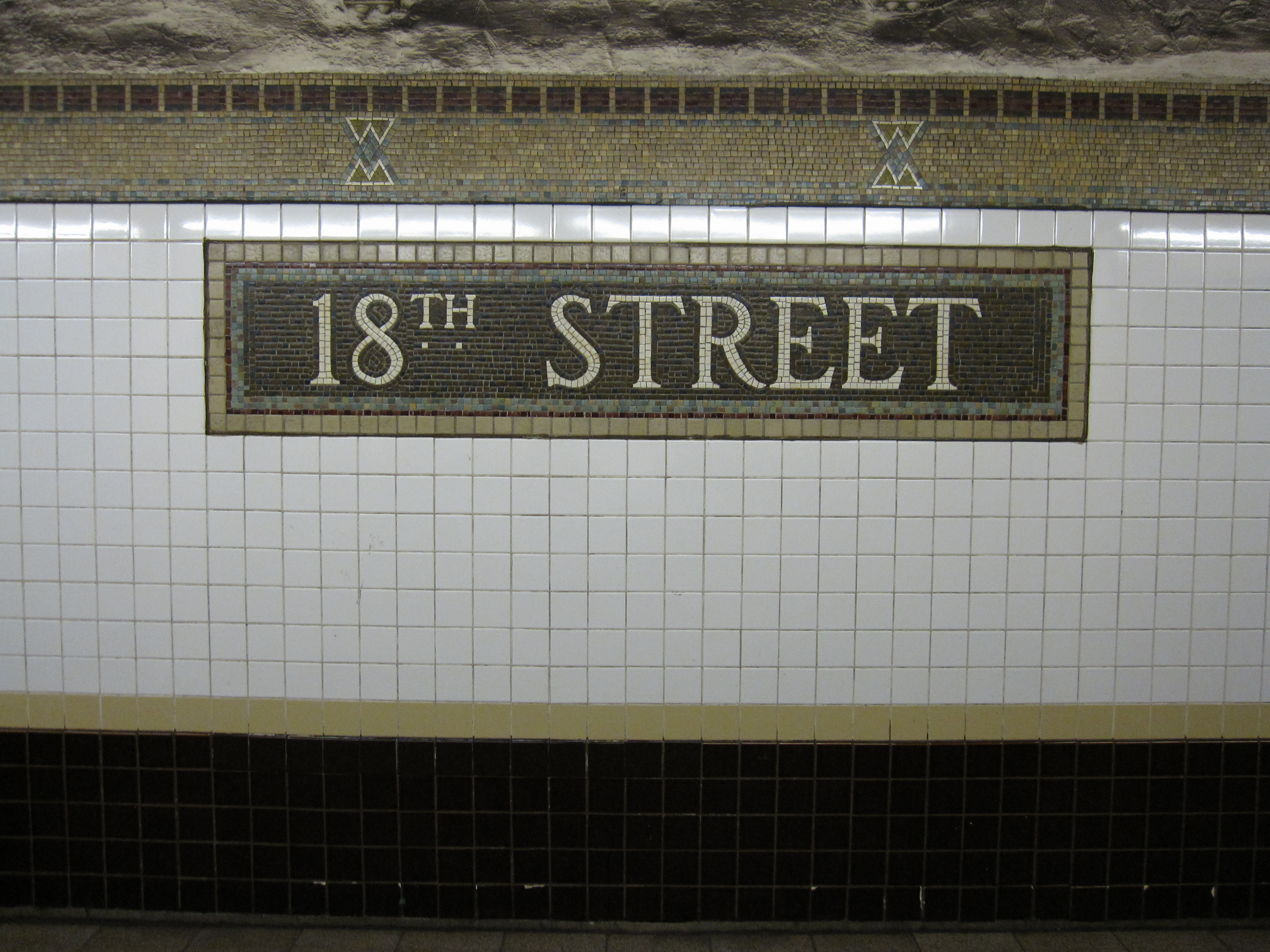
Name of the station in mosaics

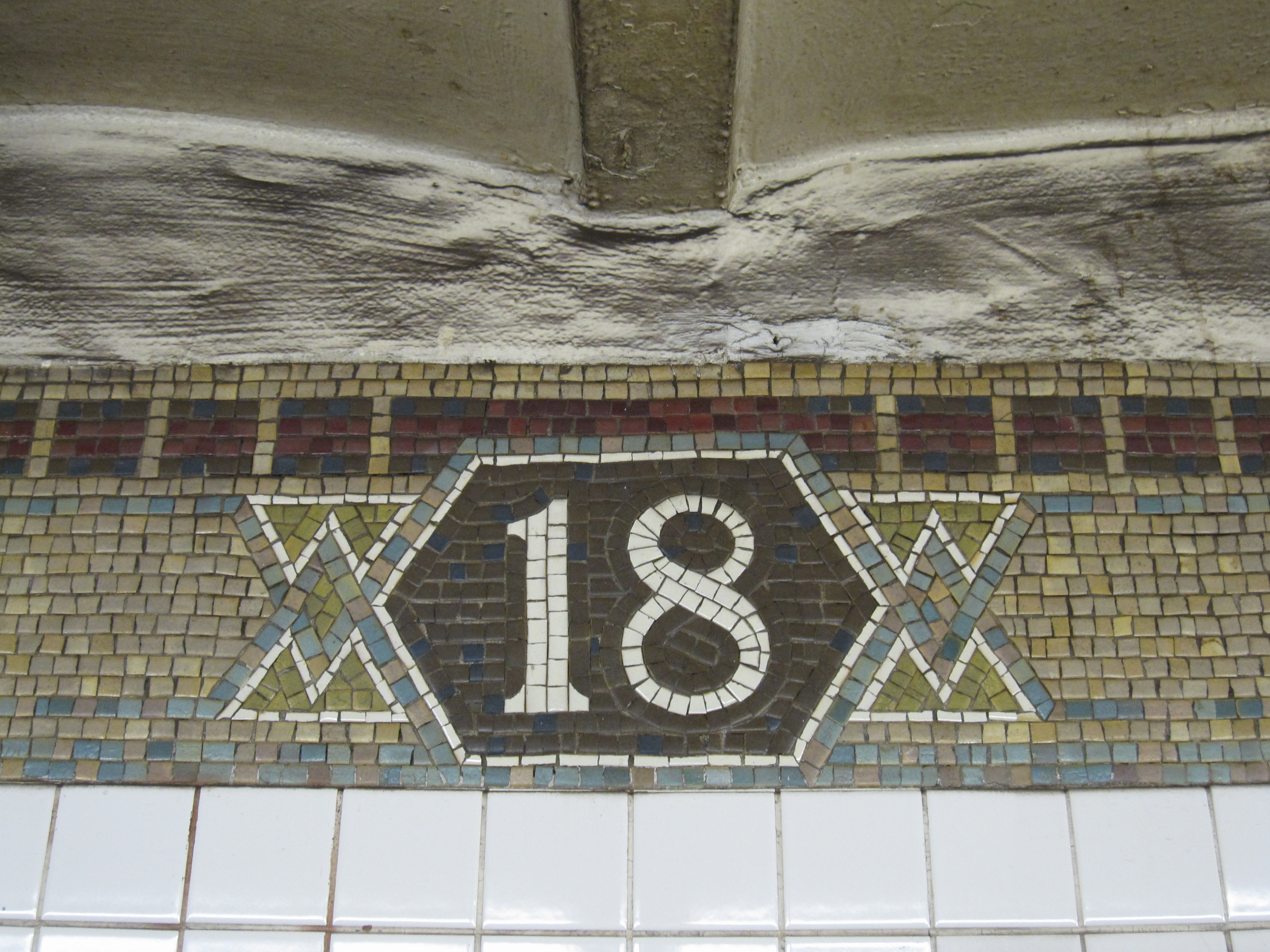
Frieze mosaics with number "18"

The Dual Contracts, which were signed on March 19, 1913, were contracts for the construction and/or rehabilitation and operation of rapid transit lines in the City of New York. The contracts were "dual" in that they were signed between the City and two separate private companies (the Interborough Rapid Transit Company and the Brooklyn Rapid Transit Company), all working together to make the construction of the Dual Contracts possible. The Dual Contracts promised the construction of several lines in Brooklyn. As part of Contract 4, the IRT agreed to build a branch of the original subway line south down Seventh Avenue, Varick Street, and West Broadway to serve the West Side of Manhattan.

The construction of this line, in conjunction with the construction of the Lexington Avenue Line, would change the operations of the IRT system. Instead of having trains go via Broadway, turning onto 42nd Street, before finally turning onto Park Avenue, there would be two trunk lines connected by the 42nd Street Shuttle. The system would be changed from looking like a "Z" system on a map to an "H" system. One trunk would run via the new Lexington Avenue Line down Park Avenue, and the other trunk would run via the new Seventh Avenue Line up Broadway. In order for the line to continue down Varick Street and West Broadway, these streets needed to be widened, and two new streets were built, the Seventh Avenue Extension and the Varick Street Extension. It was predicted that the subway extension would lead to the growth of the Lower West Side, and to neighborhoods such as Chelsea and Greenwich Village.

18th Street opened as part of an extension of the line from 34th Street–Penn Station to South Ferry on July 1, 1918. Initially, the station was served by a shuttle running from Times Square to South Ferry. The new "H" system was implemented on August 1, 1918, joining the two halves of the Broadway–Seventh Avenue Line and sending all West Side trains south from Times Square. An immediate result of the switch was the need to transfer using the 42nd Street Shuttle in order to retrace the original layout. The completion of the "H" system doubled the capacity of the IRT system.

=== Later years ===
The city government took over the IRT's operations on June 12, 1940. On August 9, 1964, the New York City Transit Authority (NYCTA) announced the letting of a $7.6 million contract to lengthen platforms at stations on the Broadway—Seventh Avenue Line from Rector Street to 34th Street–Penn Station, including 18th Street, and stations from Central Park North–110th Street to 145th Street on the Lenox Avenue Line to allow express trains to be lengthened from nine-car trains to ten-car trains, and to lengthen locals from eight-car trains to ten-car trains. With the completion of this project, the NYCTA project to lengthen IRT stations to accommodate ten-car trains would be complete.

The station underwent a $4 million renovation in the early 1990s.

== Station layout ==
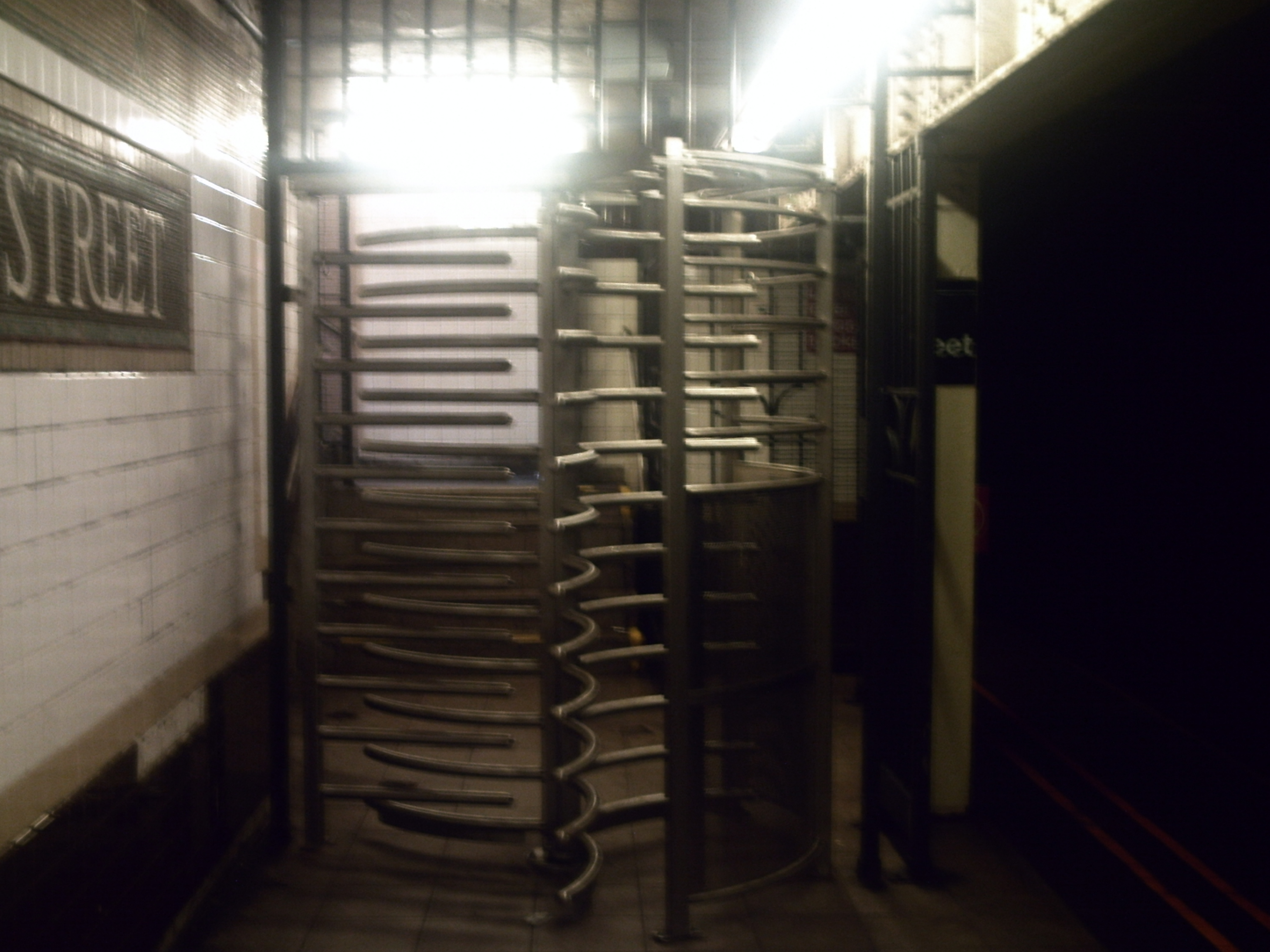
Exit-only on the southbound platform

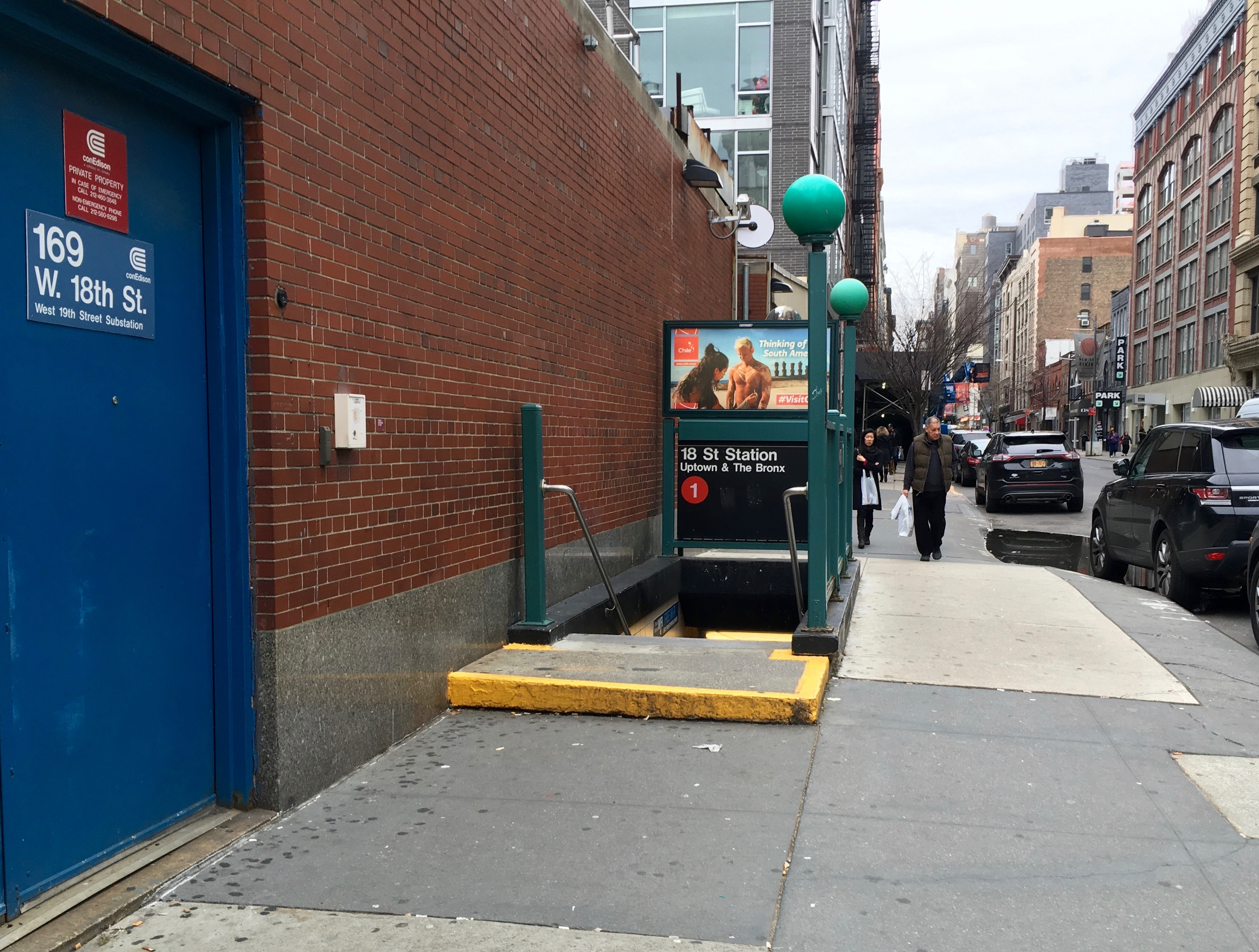
Northeast corner stairs at 18th Street and 7th Avenue

This underground station has two side platforms and four tracks. The station is served by the 1 at all times and by the 2 during late nights; the center express tracks are used by the 2 and 3 trains during daytime hours. It is between 23rd Street to the north and 14th Street to the south. The original trim line and name tablet mosaics have been retained. Beige I-beam columns run along the entire length of both platforms with every other one having the standard black station name plate with white lettering.

=== Exits ===
Each platform has a same-level fare control area that contains a turnstile bank and two street stairs. The northbound side is staffed full-time and contains a token booth; the southbound side is unstaffed. The southbound side leads to both western corners of Seventh Avenue and 18th Street while the northbound side leads to the eastern corners.

Each platform has an exit-only at the north end containing a platform level turnstile and emergency gate and single street staircase leading to 19th Street and Seventh Avenue (the southwest corner for the southbound side and southeast corner for the northbound one).
