= 34th Street–Penn Station (IRT Broadway–Seventh Avenue Line) =

New York City Subway station in Manhattan

34 Street–Penn Station
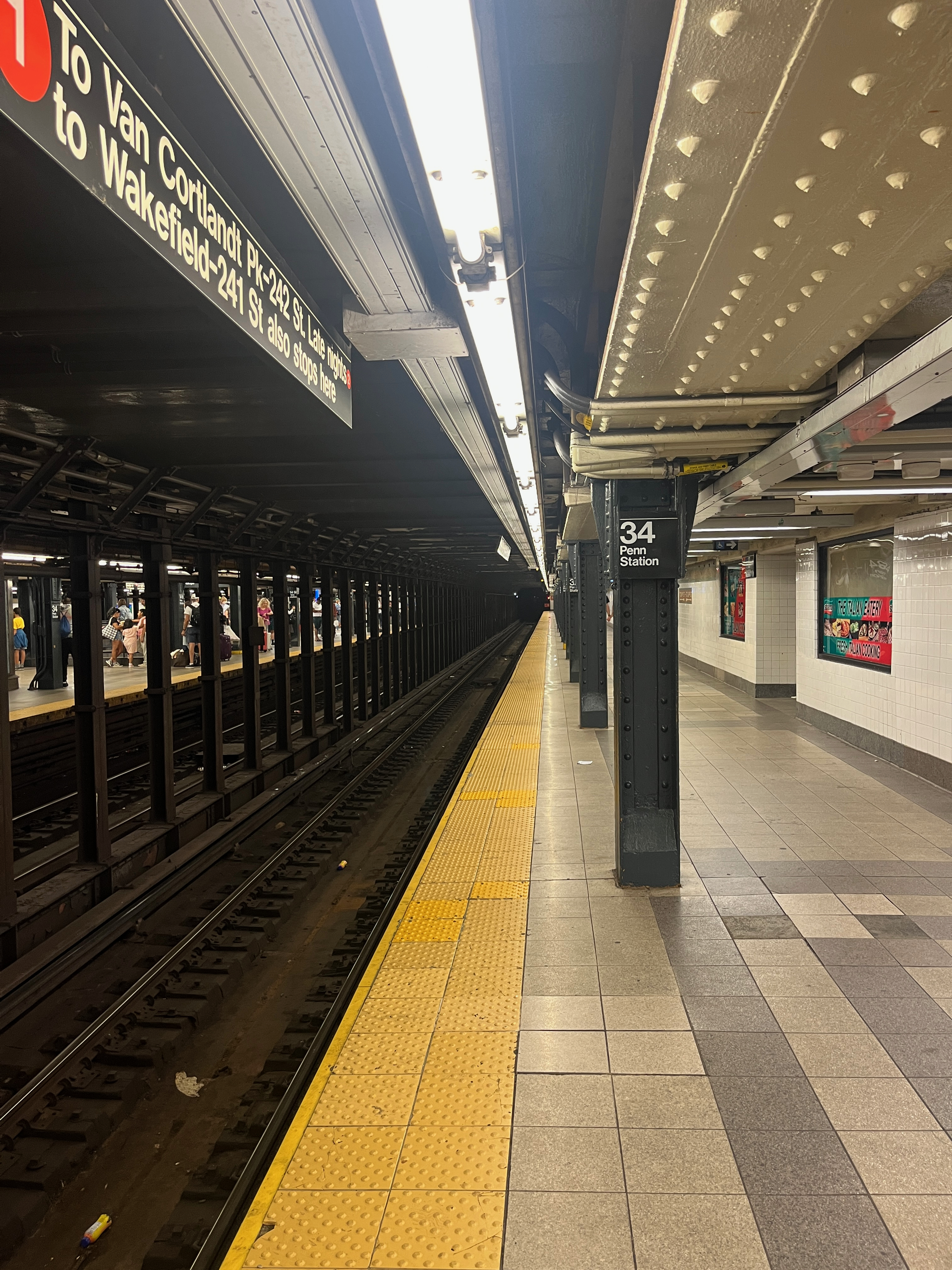
- View from northbound local platform

Station statistics
- Address: West 34th Street & Seventh Avenue; New York, New York
- Borough: Manhattan
- Locale: Midtown Manhattan
- Coordinates: 40.751°N 73.991°W
- Division: A (IRT)
- Line: IRT Broadway–Seventh Avenue Line
- Services: 1 (all times); 2 (all times); 3 (all times)
- Transit: NYCT Bus: M4, M7, M20, M34 SBS, M34A SBS, SIM23, SIM24; MTA Bus: Q32, BxM2; Amtrak, LIRR, NJT Rail at Pennsylvania Station; PATH: JSQ–33, HOB–33, JSQ–33 (via HOB) (at 33rd Street)
- Structure: Underground
- Platforms: 2 side platforms (local); 1 island platform (express)
- Tracks: 4

Other information
- Opened: June 3, 1917; 109 years ago
- Accessible: Yes

Traffic
- 2025: 17,808,404 ▲9.4%
- Rank: 7 out of 423
Services
Preceding station	New York City Subway	Following station
Times Square–42nd Street 1 2 3 northbound	Express	14th Street 2 3 via Franklin Avenue–Medgar Evers College
Times Square–42nd Street 1 2 3 northbound	Local	28th Street 1 2 toward South Ferry
Location
Location within New York City Subway
Location within New York City
Location within New York
Track layout
Street map
Station service legend
Symbol	Description
Stops all times	Stops all times
Stops late nights only	Stops late nights only
Stops all times except weekday late nights	Stops all times except weekday late nights
Stops late nights and weekends	Stops late nights and weekends
Stops weekdays during the day	Stops weekdays during the day
Stops weekends and weekend late nights	Stops weekends and weekend late nights

34th Street–Penn Station is an express station on the IRT Broadway–Seventh Avenue Line of the New York City Subway. Located at the intersection of 34th Street and Seventh Avenue in the Midtown neighborhood of Manhattan, it is served 24 hours a day by the 1, 2 and 3 trains. Connections are available to the LIRR, NJ Transit and Amtrak at Pennsylvania Station. It is the southern terminal for late-night 3 trains.

The station was built by the Interborough Rapid Transit Company (IRT) as part of the Dual Contracts with New York City, and opened on June 3, 1917.

== History ==
=== Construction and opening ===
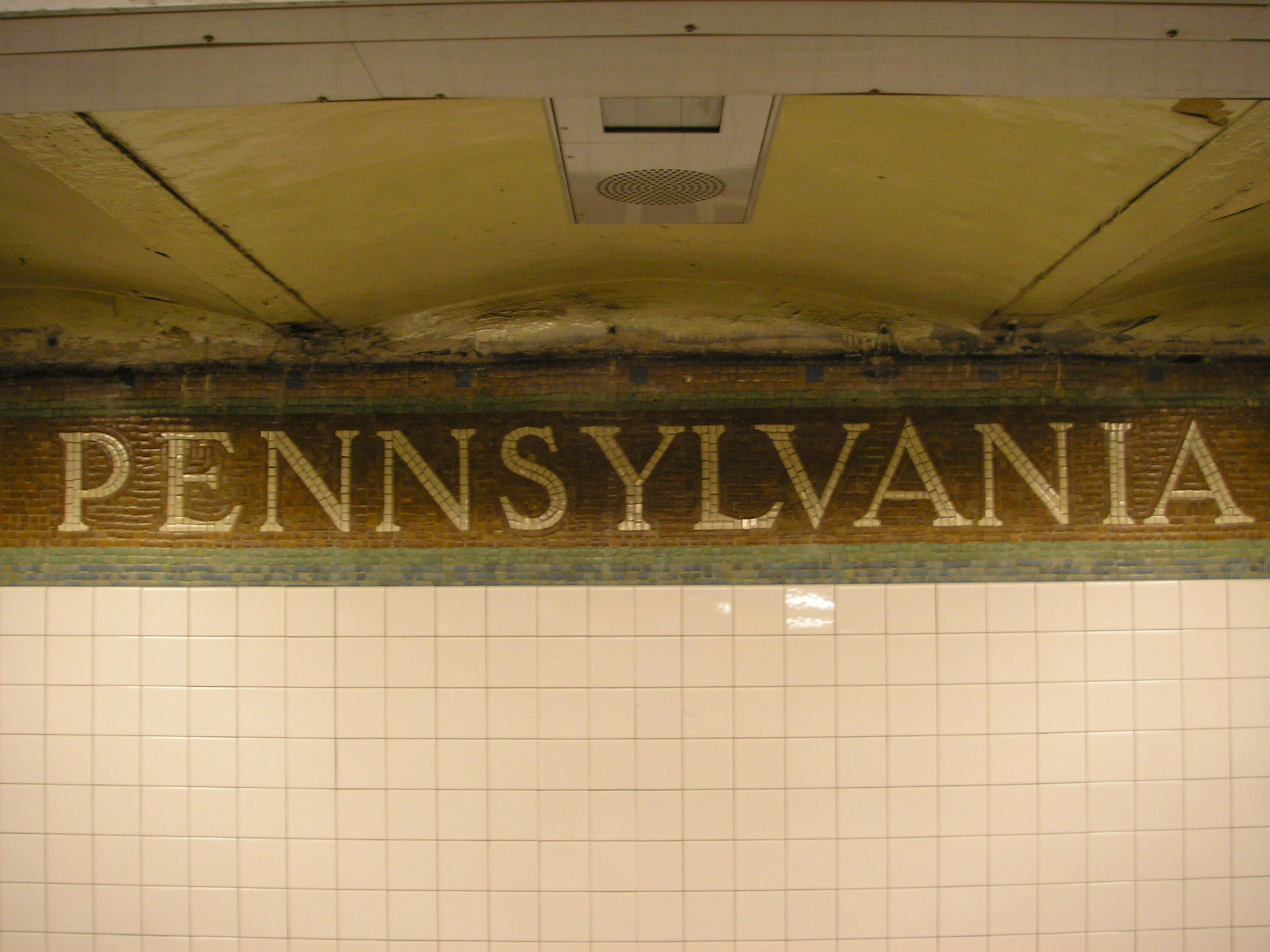
Name on trim line

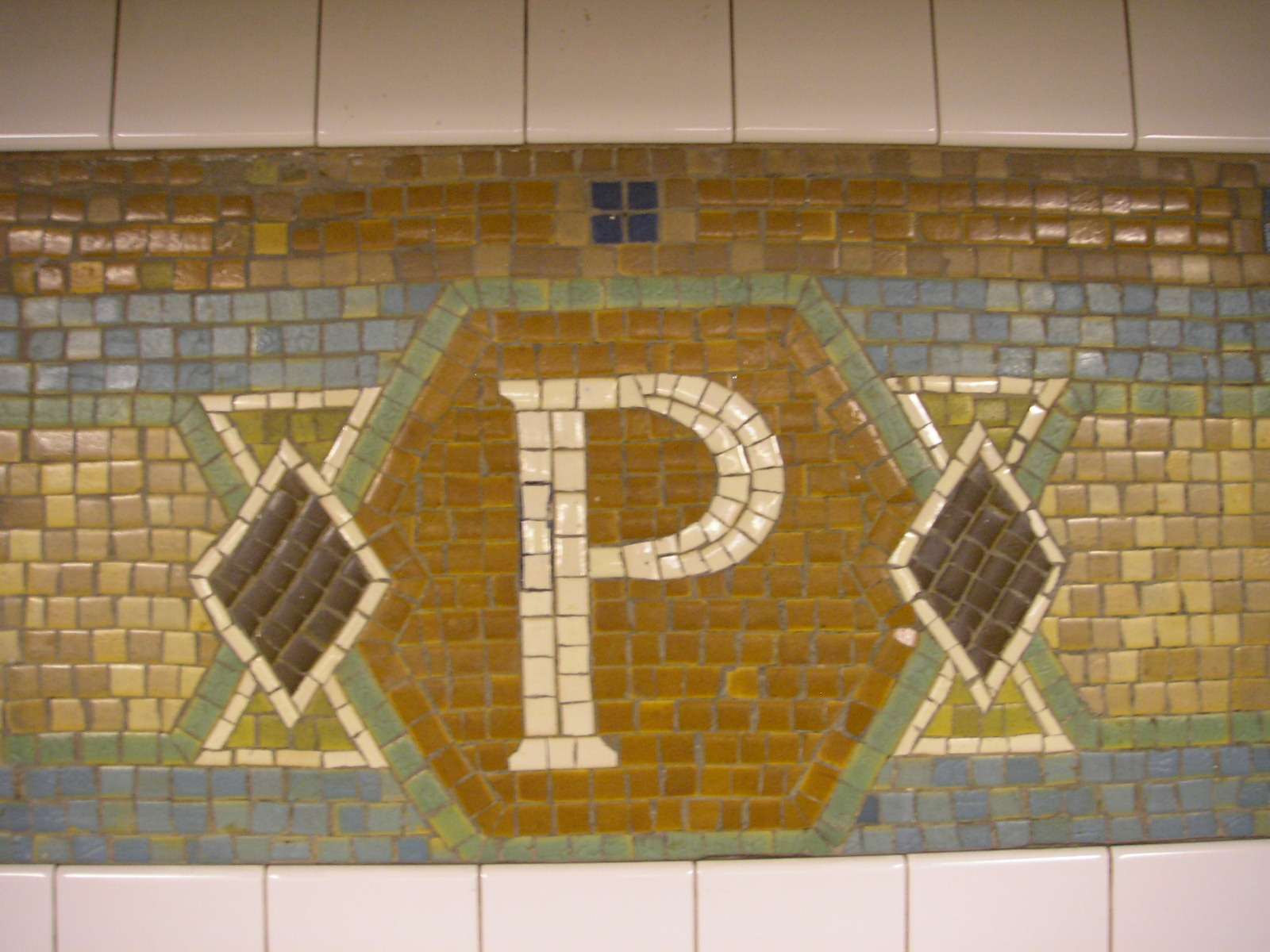
Trim line tablets

The Dual Contracts, which were signed on March 19, 1913, were contracts for the construction, rehabilitation and operation of rapid transit lines in the City of New York. The contracts were "dual" in that they were signed between the city and two separate private companies, the Interborough Rapid Transit Company (IRT) and the Brooklyn Rapid Transit Company (BRT), all working together to make the construction of the Dual Contracts possible. The Dual Contracts promised the construction of several lines in Brooklyn. As part of Contract 4, the IRT agreed to build a branch of the original subway line south down Seventh Avenue, Varick Street, and West Broadway to serve the West Side of Manhattan.

The construction of this line, in conjunction with the construction of the Lexington Avenue Line, would change the operations of the IRT system. Instead of having trains go via Broadway, turning onto 42nd Street, before finally turning onto Park Avenue, there would be two trunk lines connected by the 42nd Street Shuttle. The system would be changed from looking like a "Z" system on a map to an "H" system. One trunk would run via the new Lexington Avenue Line down Park Avenue, and the other trunk would run via the new Seventh Avenue Line up Broadway. In order for the line to continue down Varick Street and West Broadway, these streets needed to be widened, and two new streets were built, the Seventh Avenue Extension and the Varick Street Extension. It was predicted that the subway extension would lead to the growth of the Lower West Side, and to neighborhoods such as Chelsea and Greenwich Village.

34th Street–Penn Station on the IRT Broadway–Seventh Avenue Line was opened on June 3, 1917, as part of an extension of the Interborough Rapid Transit Company, the dominant subway in Manhattan at the time, from Times Square–42nd Street to South Ferry. Concrete-laying for the platforms had started shortly before the station opened, and only the northern part of the express platform was in service on the station's opening day. The passageways to Pennsylvania Station were still under construction, forcing passengers to exit the subway station and walk along the street to access the railroad station. Once the passageways were complete, passengers could access both the railroad station and the neighboring Hotel Pennsylvania at 32nd and 33rd Streets without leaving the subway station.

A shuttle service ran between Times Square and Penn Station until the rest of the extension opened a year later on July 1, 1918. Afterward, the shuttle ran from Times Square to South Ferry. The new "H" system was implemented on August 1, 1918, joining the two halves of the Broadway–Seventh Avenue Line and sending all West Side trains south from Times Square. An immediate result of the switch was the need to transfer using the 42nd Street Shuttle in order to retrace the original layout. The completion of the "H" system doubled the capacity of the IRT system.

=== Later years ===
The city government took over the IRT's operations on June 12, 1940. As part of a pilot program, the BOT installed three-dimensional advertisements at 34th Street–Penn Station in late 1948. The New York City Transit Authority (NYCTA) announced plans in 1956 to add fluorescent lights throughout the station. On August 23, 1985, the Metropolitan Transportation Authority (MTA) awarded a $2.24 million contract to rebuild the station and to double the width of the passageway to Penn Station. The project was scheduled to be completed in spring 1987.

Under the 2015–2019 MTA Capital Program, the station, along with thirty-two other New York City Subway stations, underwent a complete overhaul as part of the Enhanced Station Initiative. Updates included cellular service, Wi-Fi, charging stations, improved signage, and improved station lighting. Unlike other stations that were renovated under the initiative, 34th Street–Penn Station was not completely closed during construction. In January 2018, the NYCT and Bus Committee recommended that Judlau Contracting receive the $125 million contract for the renovations of 57th and 23rd Streets on the IND Sixth Avenue Line; 28th Street on the IRT Lexington Avenue Line, and 34th Street–Penn Station on the IRT Broadway–Seventh Avenue Line and IND Eighth Avenue Line. However, the MTA Board temporarily deferred the vote for these packages after city representatives refused to vote to award the contracts. The contract was put back for a vote in February, where it was ultimately approved. These improvements were substantially completed by May 2019.

The MTA announced in December 2021 that it would install wide-aisle fare gates for disabled passengers at five subway stations, including 34th Street–Penn Station, by mid-2022. The implementation of these fare gates was delayed; none of the wide-aisle fare gates had been installed by early 2023. The MTA announced in late 2022 that it would open customer service centers at 15 stations; the centers would provide services such as travel information and OMNY farecards. The first six customer service centers, including one at 34th Street–Penn Station, were to open in early 2023. The 34th Street station's customer service center opened at the beginning of March 2023. Additionally, the MTA replaced four of the station's elevators; this work was completed in January 2023, along with a new elevator entrance at 33rd Street.

== Station layout ==
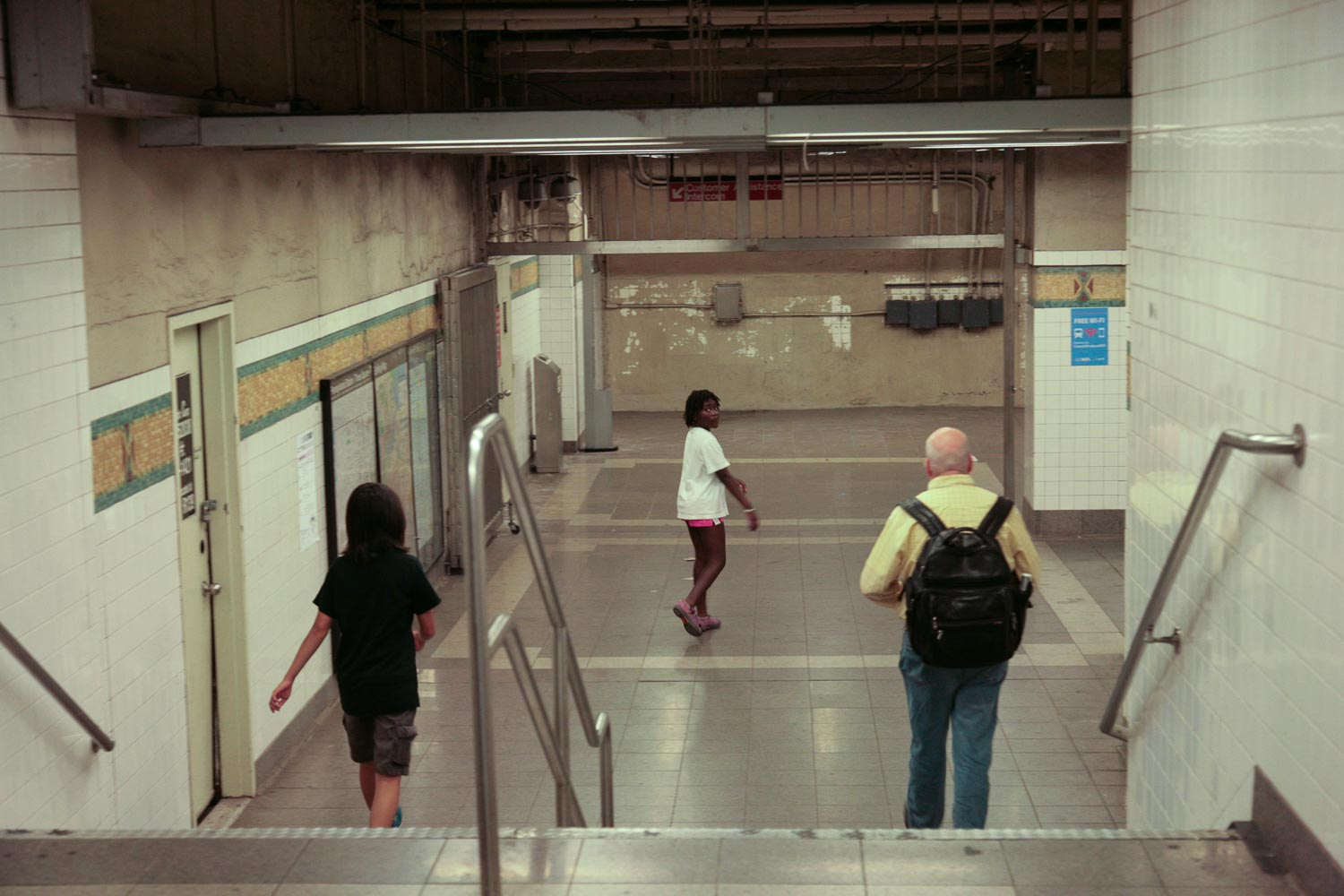
View of lower mezzanine

This station has two side platforms for local service and a center island platform for express service. Atlantic Avenue–Barclays Center on the IRT Eastern Parkway Line and 34th Street–Penn Station on the IND Eighth Avenue Line are the only other stations in the system with this configuration. This is due to the expected increase in ridership and to encourage riders to switch at the next stop northbound, Times Square–42nd Street, as it is set up in the usual island platform manner for cross-platform interchanges. There is no free transfer between this station and the station of the same name on the IND Eighth Avenue Line, despite the fact that both connect to Penn Station. The nearest transfer location is at Times Square–42nd Street with a free transfer to 42nd Street–Port Authority Bus Terminal.

The local platforms are used by the 1 train at all times and by the 2 train during the night. The express platform is used by the 2 and 3 trains during daytime hours, and during the night for originating and terminating 3 train service to and from Harlem–148th Street. The next stop to the north is Times Square–42nd Street for all service, while the next stop to the south is 28th Street for local trains and 14th Street for express trains.

33rd St to 34th St subway cross-section
11th Av	10th & 9th Avs are skipped	Farley Building & Moynihan Train Hall	8th Av	Madison Square; Garden	7th Av	Storefronts	6th Av & Broadway		5th & Madison Avs are skipped	Park Av
mezzanine	10th & 9th Avs are skipped	train hall	A/C/E	concourse	1/2/3	Former Gimbel's passageway	mezz	PATH	5th & Madison Avs are skipped	6/<6>
mezzanine	10th & 9th Avs are skipped	conc	mezzanine	concourse	mezzanine		N/Q/R/W		5th & Madison Avs are skipped
7/<7>	10th & 9th Avs are skipped	Penn Station (platform level)					B/D/F/<F>/M		5th & Madison Avs are skipped

=== Exits ===
34th Street–Penn Station spans three streets (32nd, 33rd, and 34th Streets) with a set of entrances/exits at all of these streets. For the purposes of this article, entrance and exit are interchangeable.

There are four entrances directly from the intersection of 34th Street and Seventh Avenue. On the local platforms the turnstiles for these exits are at platform level; passengers wishing to use the express platforms must use a passageway beneath the platforms and tracks. These entrances utilize the northern portions of the platforms. There is also a supplementary and handicapped-accessible entrance to the Penn Station complex in general from 34th Street. A wheelchair-accessible elevator is also present on the south side of 34th Street at Seventh Avenue, within Penn Station's LIRR entrance.

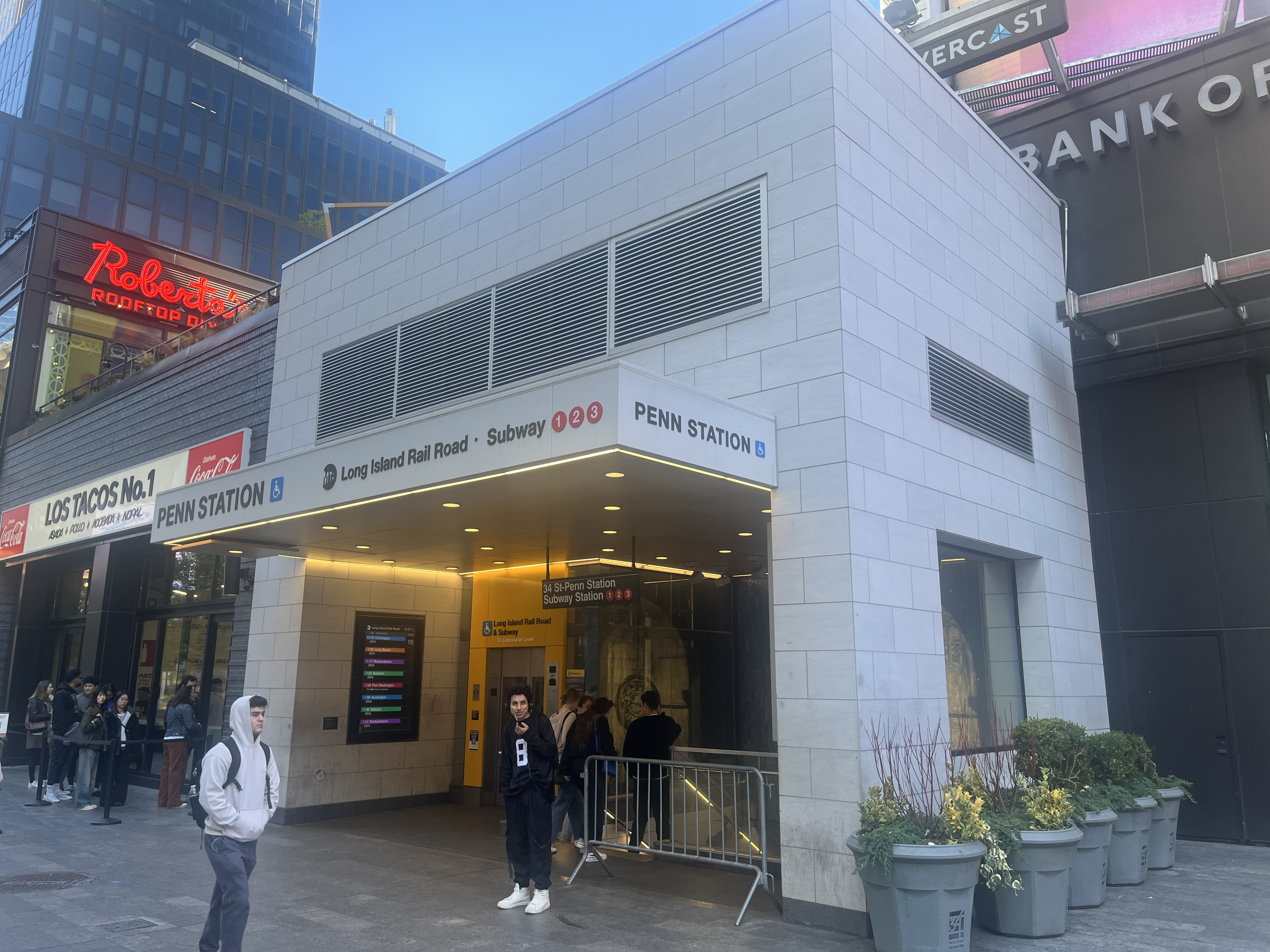
Entrance at 33rd Street

There are three direct entrances from the street at 33rd Street and Seventh Avenue. As a replacement for the southwestern corner's lack of an entrance, there is an underground entrance directly connecting the station with the Long Island Rail Road concourse in the Penn Station complex. The turnstiles for this entrance are located below the track level and utilize the central portions of the platforms. There is an elevator from the street at the northwestern corner of this intersection.

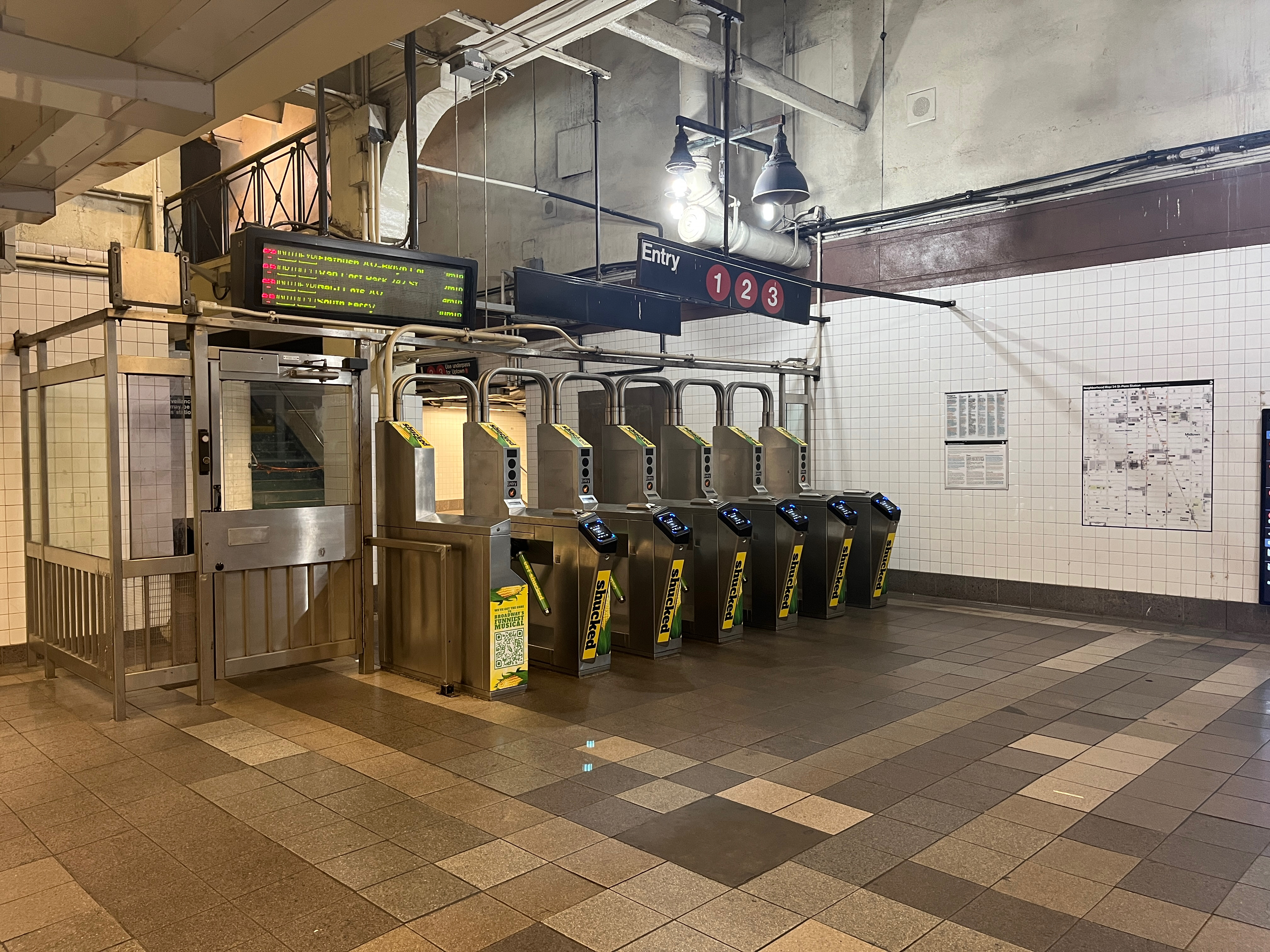
Entrance from Penn Station

The main entrance to the Penn Station complex is located on the western end of 32nd Street. From there, passengers may go through the New Jersey Transit and Long Island Rail Road concourses and use the entrance to this station at the end of the latter's concourse. There is also a smaller exit from the station at the southern ends of the platforms that connects with the end of the New Jersey Transit concourse where it meets the Long Island Rail Road underneath the main corridor in the station that connects New Jersey Transit and Amtrak. There is also an entrance on the north side of 32nd Street between Seventh and Sixth Avenues.

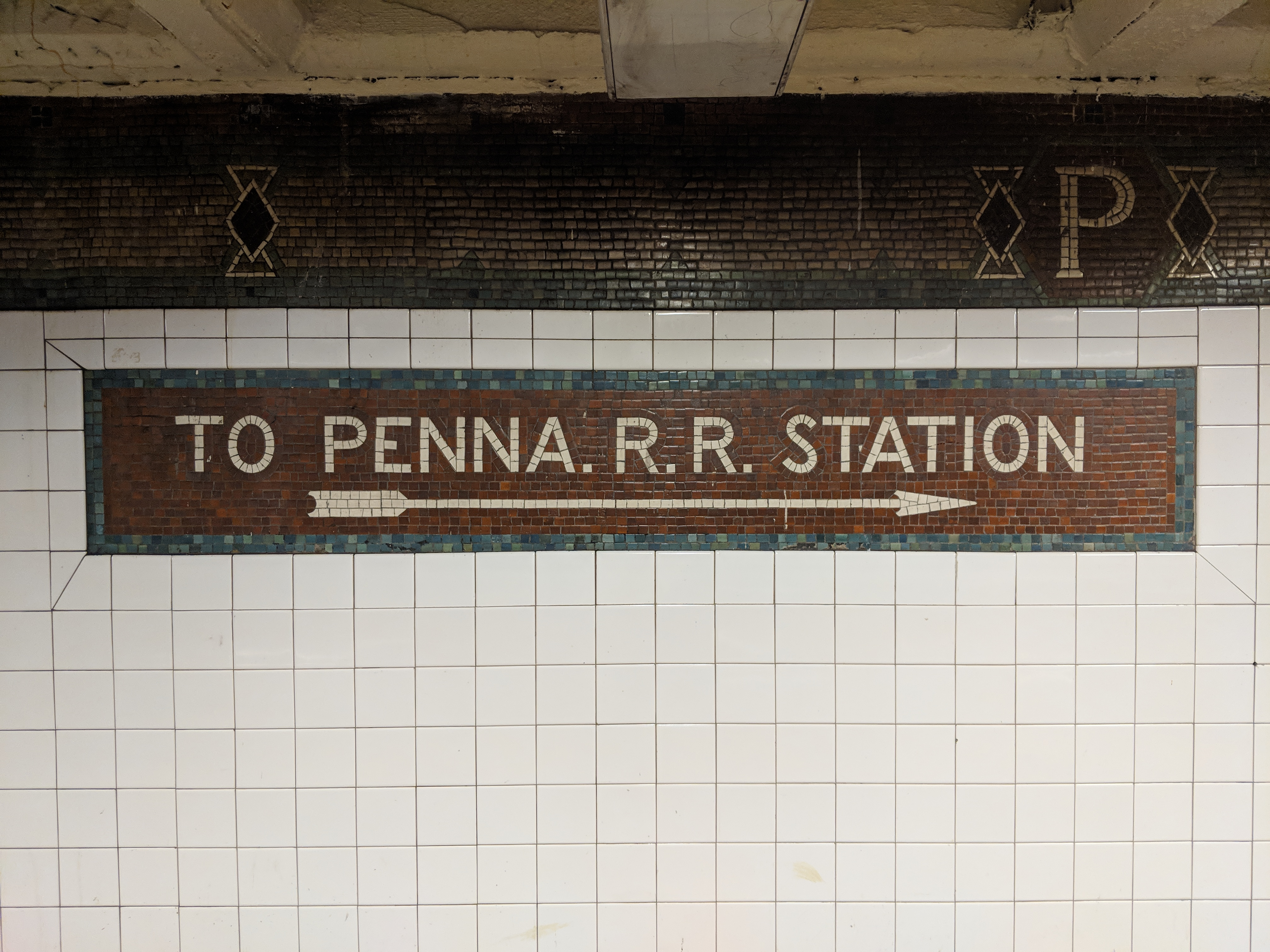
Signage pointing to Penn Station

== Ridership ==
34th Street–Penn Station on the Broadway–Seventh Avenue Line is continually ranked as one of the busiest stations in the subway system. In 2016, it was the fifth-busiest subway station, with 27,741,367 riders as recorded by the Metropolitan Transportation Authority. By comparison, its sister station on the Eighth Avenue Line is ranked sixth-busiest, with 25,183,869 passengers. When the Broadway–Seventh Avenue Line station was a shuttle stop before the rest of the South Ferry extension opened, ridership was quite low; in its first year of operation, only 78,121 boardings were recorded.
