= 145th Street station (IRT Broadway–Seventh Avenue Line) =

New York City Subway station in Manhattan

145 Street
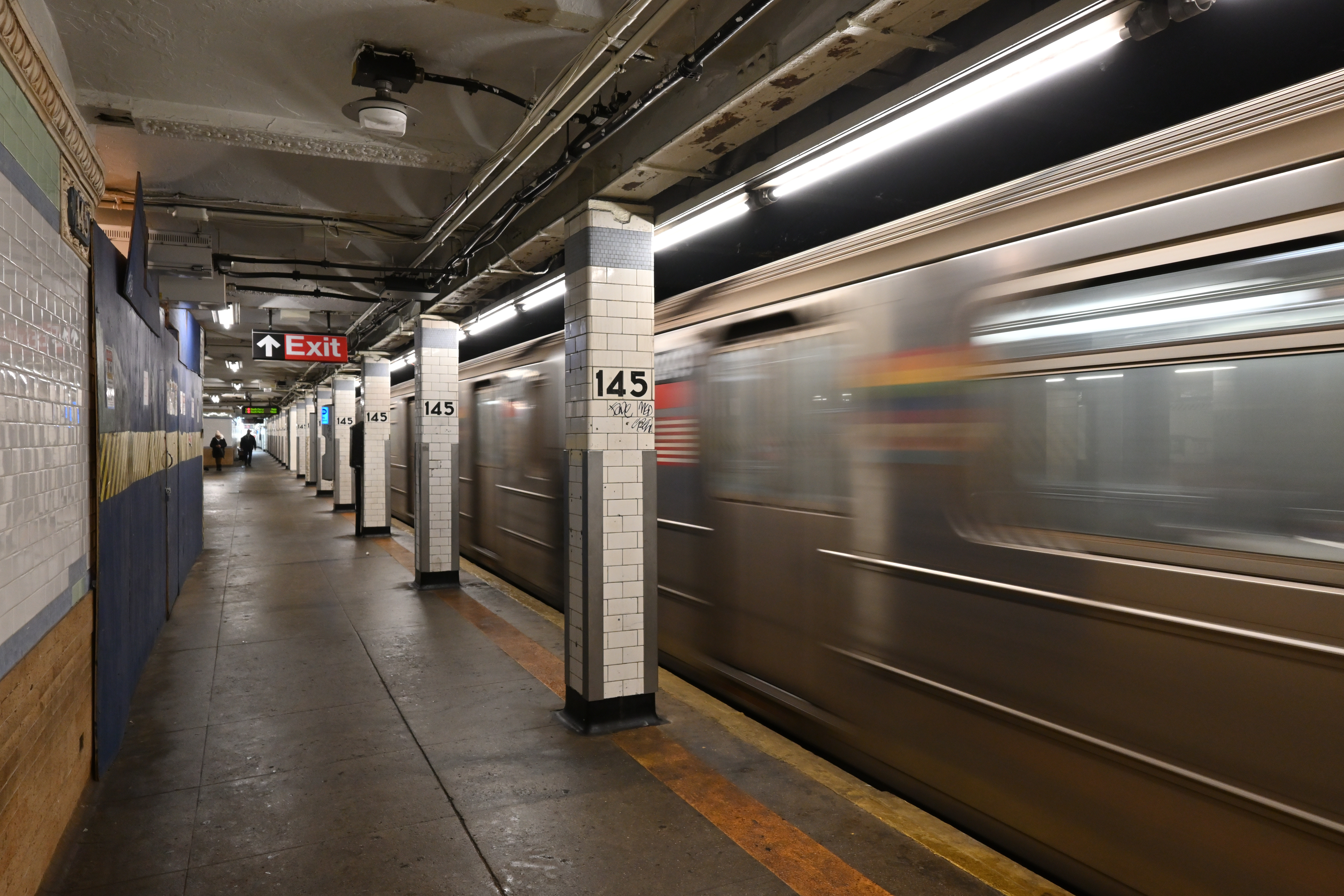
- Southbound platform with 1 train leaving station

Station statistics
- Address: West 145th Street & Broadway; New York, New York
- Borough: Manhattan
- Locale: Hamilton Heights
- Coordinates: 40.826°N 73.95°W
- Division: A (IRT)
- Line: IRT Broadway–Seventh Avenue Line
- Services: 1 (all times)
- Transit: NYCT Bus: M4, M5, Bx19; Columbia Transportation: Intercampus Blue, Intercampus Green, Intercampus Red
- Structure: Underground
- Platforms: 2 side platforms
- Tracks: 3 (2 in regular service)

Other information
- Opened: October 27, 1904 (122 years ago)

Traffic
- 2025: 2,168,938 ▲2.6%
- Rank: 170 out of 423
Services
Preceding station	New York City Subway	Following station
157th Street toward Van Cortlandt Park–242nd Street	Local	137th Street–City College toward South Ferry
Non-revenue services and lines
Preceding station	New York City Subway	Following station
	no service	96th Street express
Location
Location within New York City Subway
Location within New York City
Location within New York
Track layout
Street map
Station service legend
Symbol	Description
Stops all times	Stops all times

The 145th Street station is a local station on the IRT Broadway–Seventh Avenue Line of the New York City Subway. Located at the intersection of Broadway and 145th Street in Hamilton Heights neighborhood of Manhattan, it is served by the 1 trains at all times.

The 145th Street station was constructed for the Interborough Rapid Transit Company (IRT) as part of the city's first subway line, which was approved in 1900. Construction of the line segment that includes 145th Street began on May 14 of the same year. The station opened on October 27, 1904, as the northern terminal of the original 28 stations of the New York City Subway. The station's platforms were lengthened in 1948.

The 145th Street station contains two side platforms and three tracks; the center track is not used in regular service. The station was built with tile and mosaic decorations. The platforms contain exits to 145th Street and Broadway and are not connected to each other within fare control.

== History ==
=== Construction and opening ===
Planning for a subway line in New York City dates to 1864, but development of what became the city's first subway line did not start until 1894, when the New York State Legislature passed the Rapid Transit Act. The subway plans were drawn up by a team of engineers led by William Barclay Parsons, the Rapid Transit Commission's chief engineer. It called for a subway line from New York City Hall in lower Manhattan to the Upper West Side, where two branches would lead north into the Bronx. A plan was formally adopted in 1897, and all legal conflicts over the route alignment were resolved near the end of 1899.

The Rapid Transit Construction Company, organized by John B. McDonald and funded by August Belmont Jr., signed the initial Contract 1 with the Rapid Transit Commission in February 1900, under which it would construct the subway and maintain a 50-year operating lease from the opening of the line. In 1901, the firm of Heins & LaFarge was hired to design the underground stations. Belmont incorporated the Interborough Rapid Transit Company (IRT) in April 1902 to operate the subway.

The 145th Street station was constructed as part of the IRT's West Side Line (now the Broadway–Seventh Avenue Line) from 133rd Street to a point 100 feet (30 m) north of 182nd Street. Work on this section was conducted by L. B. McCabe & Brother, who started building the tunnel segment on May 14, 1900. On that date, a groundbreaking ceremony took place at Broadway and 156th Street, one block south of the 157th Street station site. The section of the West Side Line around this station was originally planned as a two-track line, but in early 1901, was changed to a three-track structure to permit train storage in the center track. A third track was added directly north of 96th Street, immediately east of the originally planned two tracks. By late 1903, the subway was nearly complete, but the IRT Powerhouse and the system's electrical substations were still under construction, delaying the system's opening. As late as October 26, 1904, the day before the subway was scheduled to open, the walls and ceilings were incomplete.

The 145th Street station opened on October 27, 1904, as the northern terminal of the original 28-station New York City Subway line to City Hall. It served as the initial terminus because the planned terminal at 157th Street was not yet complete due to unfinished painting and plastering work. The line was extended one stop to 157th Street a couple of weeks later on November 12, 1904, and ultimately was extended north to 242nd Street in the Bronx by August 1908.

=== Service changes and station renovations ===
After the first subway line was completed in 1908, the station was served by West Side local and express trains. Express trains began at South Ferry in Manhattan or Atlantic Avenue in Brooklyn, and ended at 242nd Street in the Bronx. Local trains ran from City Hall to 242nd Street during rush hours, continuing south from City Hall to South Ferry at other times. In 1918, the Broadway–Seventh Avenue Line opened south of Times Square–42nd Street, and the original line was divided into an H-shaped system. The original subway north of Times Square thus became part of the Broadway–Seventh Avenue Line. Local trains were sent to South Ferry, while express trains used the new Clark Street Tunnel to Brooklyn.

To address overcrowding, in 1909, the New York Public Service Commission proposed lengthening the platforms at stations along the original IRT subway. As part of a modification to the IRT's construction contracts made on January 18, 1910, the company was to lengthen station platforms to accommodate ten-car express and six-car local trains. In addition to $1.5 million (equivalent to $51.8 million in 2025) spent on platform lengthening, $500,000 (equivalent to $17.3 million in 2025) was spent on building additional entrances and exits. It was anticipated that these improvements would increase capacity by 25 percent. The northbound platform at the 145th Street station was extended 150 feet (46 m) to the south, while the southbound platform was not lengthened. The work involved reconstructing the interlocking between the center and northbound tracks. Six-car local trains began operating in October 1910, and ten-car express trains began running on the West Side Line on January 24, 1911. Subsequently, the station could accommodate six-car local trains, but ten-car trains could not open some of their doors.

The city government took over the IRT's operations on June 12, 1940. Platforms at IRT Broadway–Seventh Avenue Line stations between 103rd Street and 238th Street, including those at 145th Street, were lengthened to 514 feet (157 m) between 1946 and 1948, allowing full ten-car express trains to stop at these stations. A contract for the platform extensions at 145th Street and eight other stations on the line was awarded to Spencer, White & Prentis Inc. in October 1946, with an estimated cost of $3.891 million. The platform extensions at these stations were opened in stages. On April 6, 1948, the platform extension at 145th Street opened. Simultaneously, the IRT routes were given numbered designations with the introduction of "R-type" rolling stock, which contained rollsigns with numbered designations for each service. The route to 242nd Street became known as the 1. In 1959, all 1 trains became local.

In April 1988, the New York City Transit Authority (NYCTA) unveiled plans to speed up service on the Broadway–Seventh Avenue Line through the implementation of a skip-stop service: the 9 train. When skip-stop service began on August 21, 1989, skip-stop service was implemented during rush hours and middays. 145th Street was the southernmost local stop that was served by the 9 during rush hours and middays and the 1 at other times. On September 4, 1994, midday skip-stop service was discontinued. Skip-stop service ended on May 27, 2005, as a result of a decrease in the number of riders who benefited.

== Station layout ==
Ground	Street level	Exit/entrance
Platform level	Side platform
Platform level	Northbound local	← toward Van Cortlandt Park–242nd Street (157th Street)
Platform level	Peak-direction express	No regular service
Platform level	Southbound local	toward South Ferry (137th Street–City College) →
Platform level	Side platform

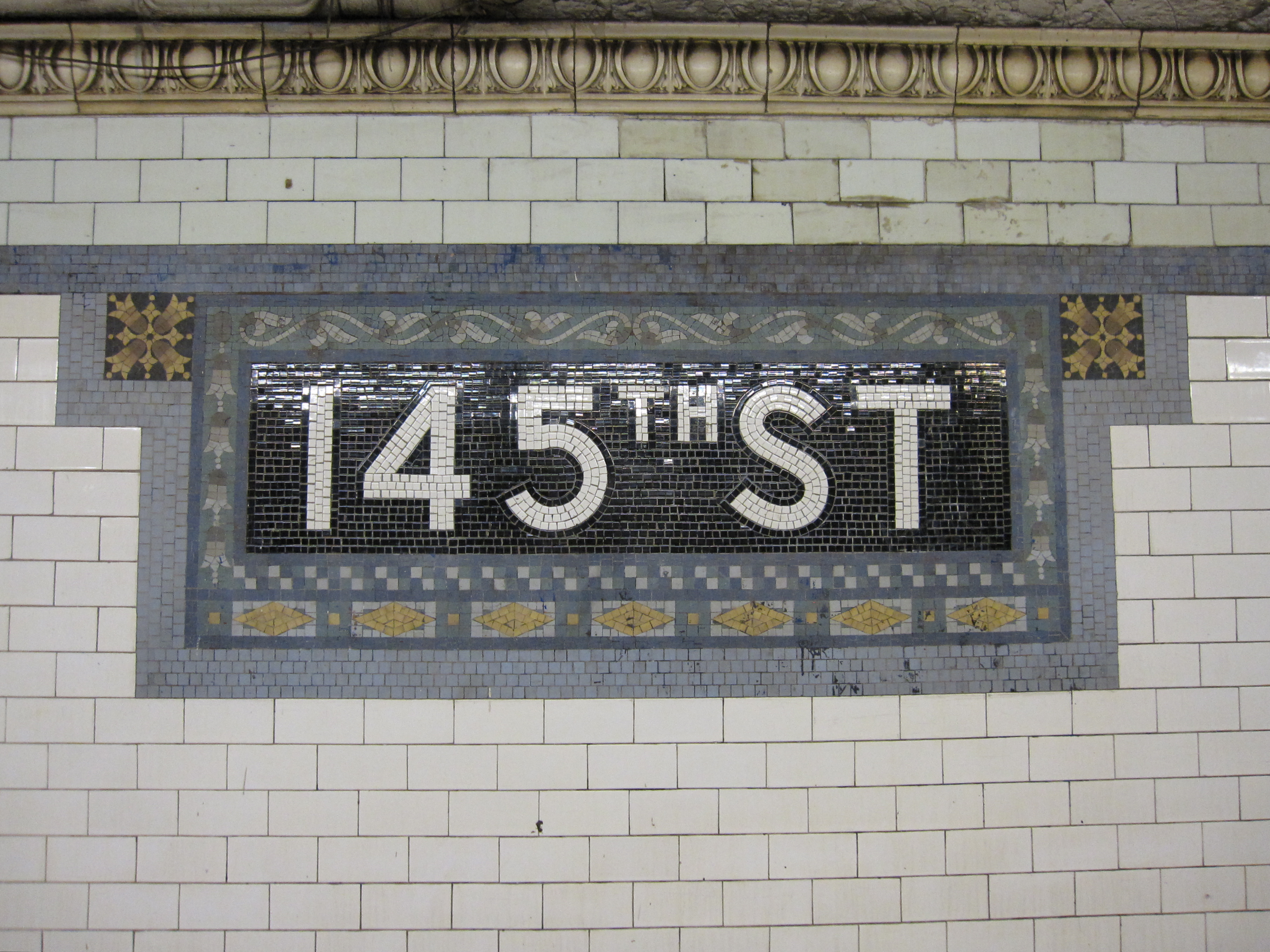
Mosaic name tablet

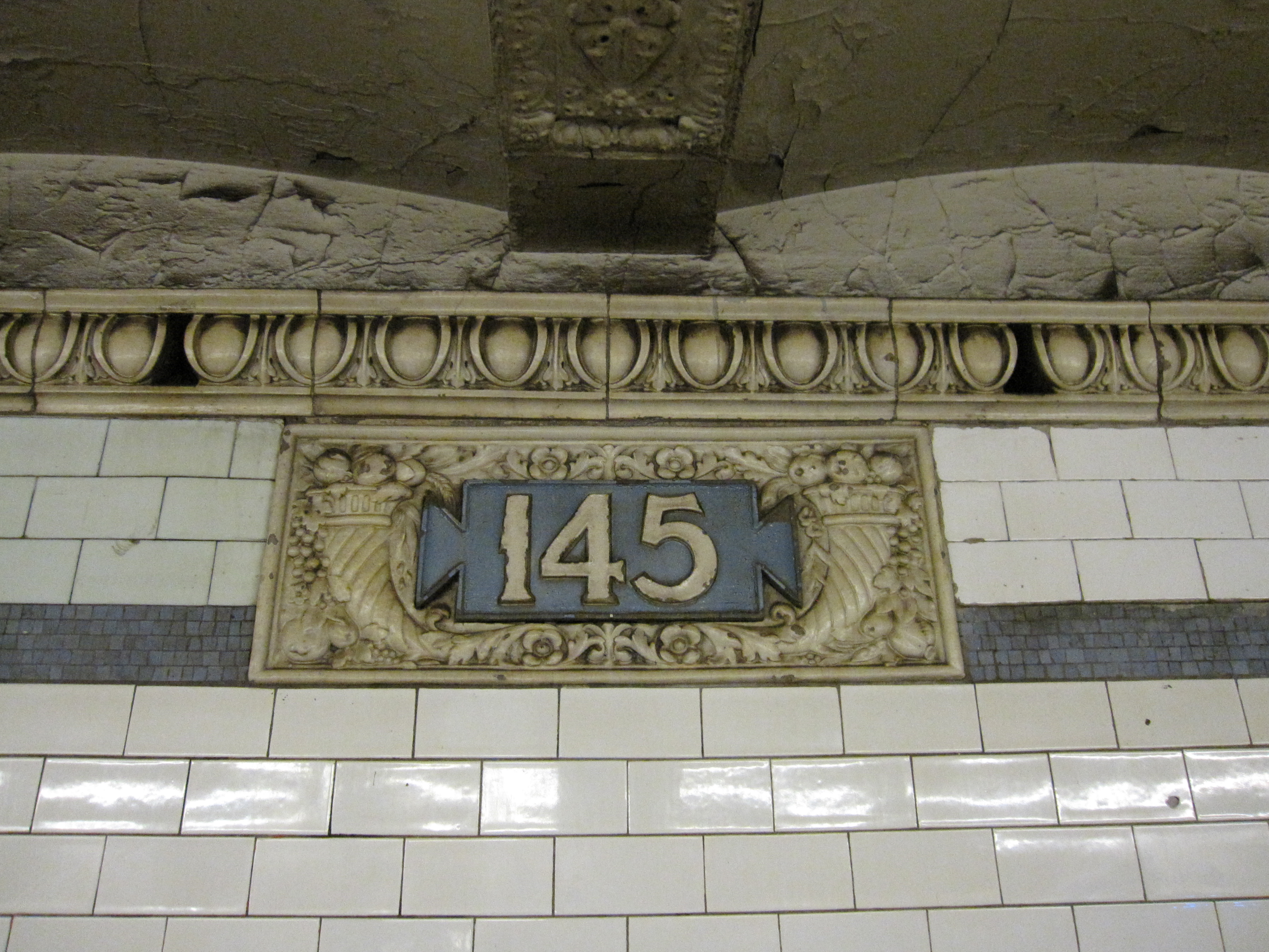
Original station name cartouche with frieze

This station was part of the original subway, and has two side platforms and three tracks, the center one being an unused express track. The station is served by the 1 at all times and is between 157th Street to the north and 137th Street to the south. The platforms were originally 350 feet (110 m) long, like at other stations north of 96th Street, but as a result of the 1948 platform extension, became 520 feet (160 m) long. The platform extensions are at the southern ends of the uptown platform and the northern end of the downtown platform, making them slightly offset. Fixed platform barriers, which are intended to prevent commuters falling to the tracks, are positioned near the platform edges.

=== Design ===
As with other stations built as part of the original IRT, the station was constructed using a cut-and-cover method. The tunnel is covered by a U-shaped trough that contains utility pipes and wires. This trough contains a foundation of concrete no less than 4 inches (100 mm) thick. Each platform consists of 3-inch-thick (7.6 cm) concrete slabs, beneath which are drainage basins. The original platforms contain circular, cast-iron Doric-style columns spaced every 15 feet (4.6 m), while the platform extensions contain I-beam columns. Additional columns between the tracks, spaced every 5 feet (1.5 m), support the jack-arched concrete station roofs. There is a 1-inch (25 mm) gap between the trough wall and the platform walls, which are made of 4-inch (100 mm)-thick brick covered over by a tiled finish.

The decorative scheme consists of blue tile tablets; blue tile bands; a white terracotta cornice; and light blue terracotta plaques. The mosaic tiles at all original IRT stations were manufactured by the American Encaustic Tile Company, which subcontracted the installations at each station. The decorative work was performed by tile contractor Manhattan Glass Tile Company and terracotta contractor Atlantic Terra Cotta Company. The platforms contain their original trim line of green with gray borders. "145" in white lettering on a dark border are tiled onto the trim. The station's other name tablets show "145TH ST." in a multi-color mosaic. The directional signs read also read "145TH ST." in white lettering on a black border.

=== Track layout ===
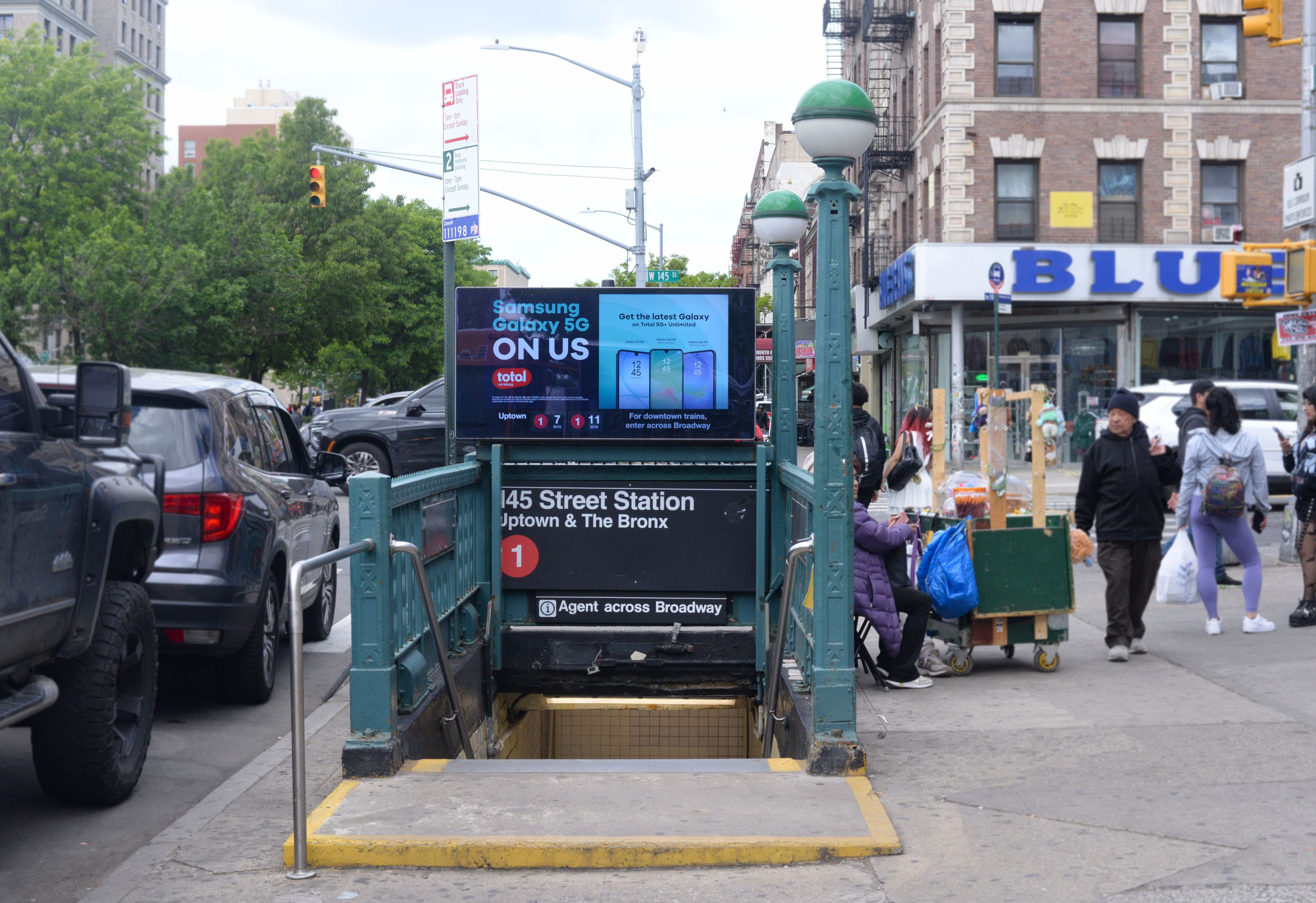
Street stair towards uptown platform

The northbound local track merges with the center track north of the station and the line continues north as two tracks. The switch from the southbound track to the center track is south of the station.

Just south of the station lies the underground 137th Street Yard, which is visible from passing trains. The track layout allows northbound trains to bypass this station by switching to the center express track in the 137th Street Yard.

=== Exits ===
Both platforms have same-level fare control containing a bank of turnstiles, token booth, and staircases to the street. The northbound platform has two staircases (one to each eastern corner of Broadway and 145th Street) and the southbound platform has a single staircase to the northwestern corner. There are no crossovers or crossunders to allow transfers between directions.
