= 157th Street station =

New York City Subway station in Manhattan

157 Street
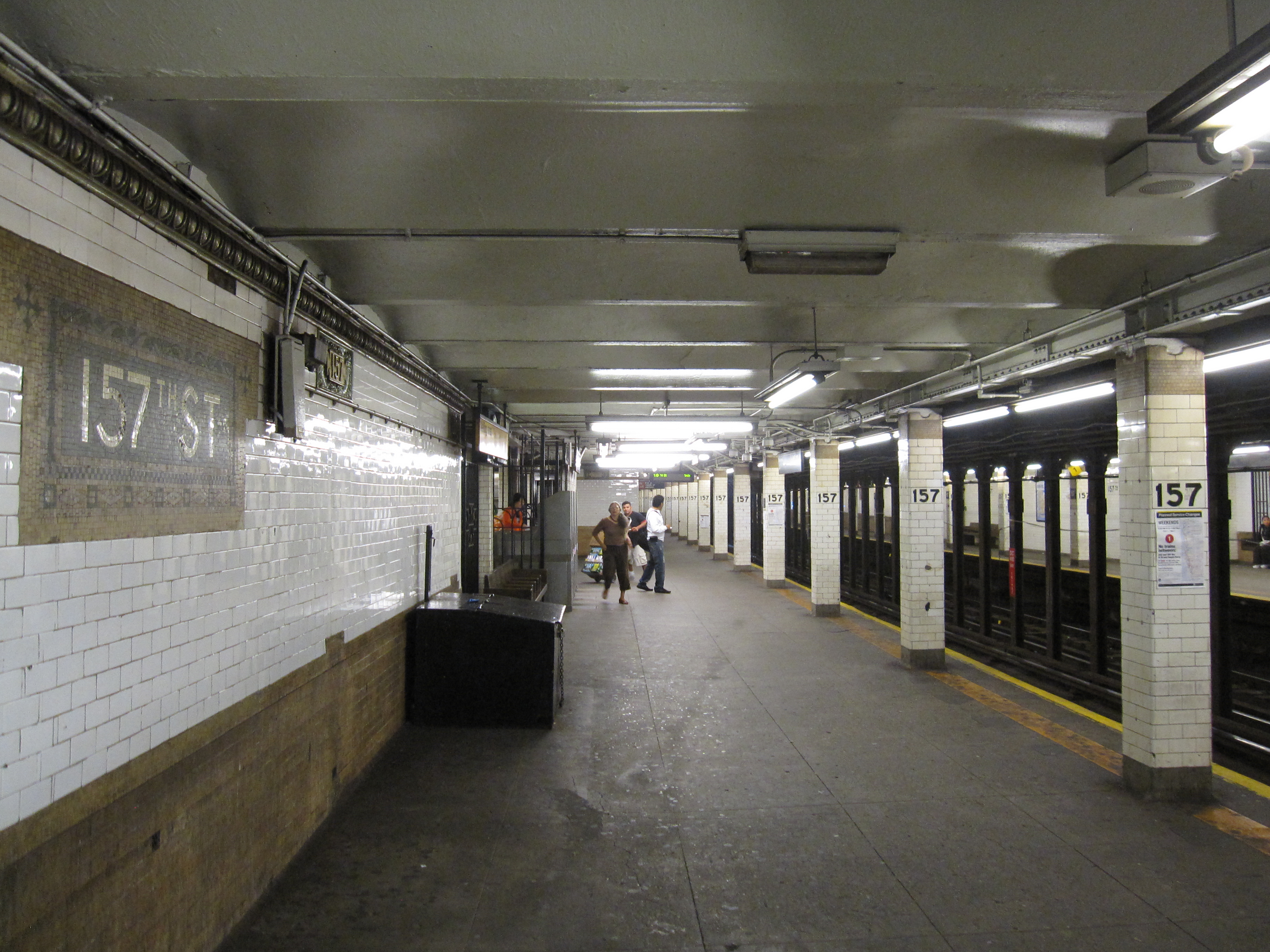
- The southbound platform

Station statistics
- Address: West 157th Street & Broadway; New York, New York
- Borough: Manhattan
- Locale: Washington Heights
- Coordinates: 40.834°N 73.944°W
- Division: A (IRT)
- Line: IRT Broadway–Seventh Avenue Line
- Services: 1 (all times)
- Transit: NYCT Bus: M4, M5, Bx6, Bx6 SBS (M3, M100, M101 on Amsterdam Avenue)
- Structure: Underground
- Platforms: 2 side platforms
- Tracks: 2

Other information
- Opened: November 12, 1904 (121 years ago)
- Accessible: No; planned

Traffic
- 2025: 2,401,979 ▲7.2%
- Rank: 155 out of 423
Services
Preceding station	New York City Subway	Following station
168th Street toward Van Cortlandt Park–242nd Street	1 (New York City Subway service)	145th Street toward South Ferry
Non-revenue services and lines
Preceding station	New York City Subway	Following station
	no service	96th Street express; one-way operation
Location
Location within New York City Subway
Location within New York City
Location within New York
Track layout
Street map
Station service legend
Symbol	Description
Stops all times	Stops all times

The 157th Street station is a local station on the IRT Broadway–Seventh Avenue Line of the New York City Subway. Located at the intersection of Broadway and 157th Street in Washington Heights neighborhood of Manhattan, it is served by the 1 train at all times.

The 157th Street station was constructed for the Interborough Rapid Transit Company (IRT) as part of the city's first subway line, which was approved in 1900. Construction of the line segment that includes 157th Street began on May 14 of the same year. The station held a soft opening on October 29, 1904, and officially opened two weeks later on November 12. The station's platforms were lengthened in 1948, and the station was renovated in the late 20th century.

The 157th Street station contains two side platforms and two tracks. The station was built with tile and mosaic decorations. The platforms contain exits to Broadway's intersection with 157th Street and not connected to each other within fare control.

== History ==
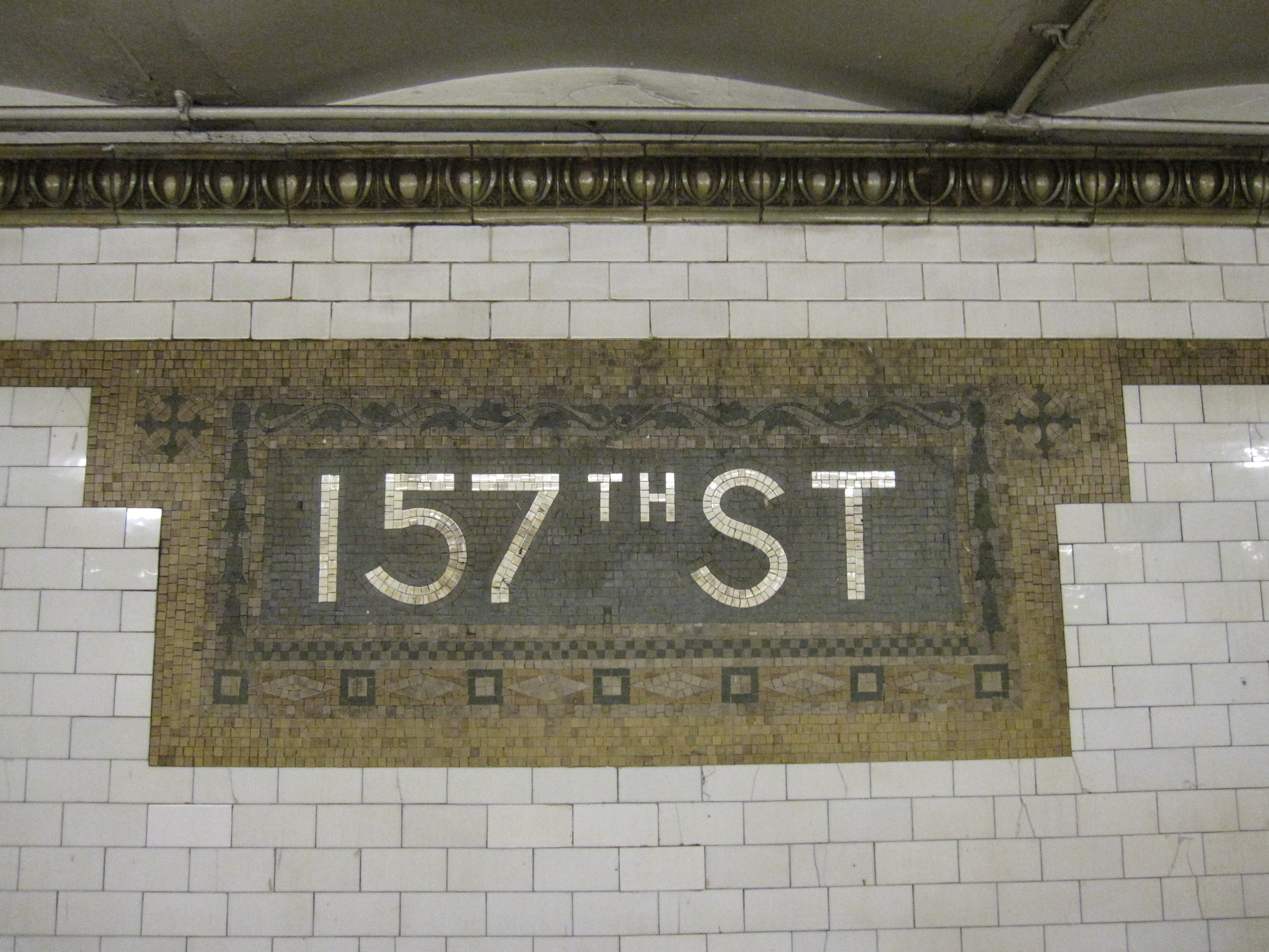
Original station name mosaic

=== Construction ===
Planning for a subway line in New York City dates to 1864, but development of what became the city's first subway line did not start until 1894, when the New York State Legislature passed the Rapid Transit Act. The subway plans were drawn up by a team of engineers led by William Barclay Parsons, the Rapid Transit Commission's chief engineer. It called for a subway line from New York City Hall in lower Manhattan to the Upper West Side, where two branches would lead north into the Bronx. A plan was formally adopted in 1897, and all legal conflicts over the route alignment were resolved near the end of 1899.

The Rapid Transit Construction Company, organized by John B. McDonald and funded by August Belmont Jr., signed the initial Contract 1 with the Rapid Transit Commission in February 1900, under which it would construct the subway and maintain a 50-year operating lease from the opening of the line. In 1901, the firm of Heins & LaFarge was hired to design the underground stations. Belmont incorporated the Interborough Rapid Transit Company (IRT) in April 1902 to operate the subway.

The 157th Street station was constructed as part of the IRT's West Side Line (now the Broadway–Seventh Avenue Line) from 133rd Street to a point 100 feet (30 m) north of 182nd Street. Work on this section was conducted by L. B. McCabe & Brother, who started building the tunnel segment on May 14, 1900. On that date, a groundbreaking ceremony took place at Broadway and 156th Street, one block south of the 157th Street station site. The section of the West Side Line around this station was originally planned as a two-track line, but in early 1901, was changed to a three-track structure to permit train storage in the center track. A third track was added directly north of 96th Street, immediately east of the originally planned two tracks.

=== Opening ===
Operation of the first subway began on October 27, 1904, with the opening of the original 28 stations of the New York City Subway from City Hall to 145th Street on the West Side Branch. 157th Street was constructed as part of this initial line and was intended to open the same day, but painting and plastering work had not been completed. The station opened for limited service two days later to accommodate passengers traveling to a Yale–Columbia football game at the Polo Grounds. 157th Street formally opened on November 12, 1904; it became the northern terminus for West Side Line trains, relieving congestion at 96th Street, which previously had been the terminus for the IRT's local trains. There had been an unsuccessful proposal during the station's construction to name it after the neighboring Audubon Park enclave, but the station's opening nonetheless led to an influx of development in Audubon Park, where apartment buildings were developed in the following decades.

On March 12, 1906, the IRT was extended from 157th Street to 221st Street. Shuttle trains served the new extension terminating at 157th Street, meaning that passengers south of 157th Street wanting to go to stations on the extension had to transfer at 157th Street. On May 30, 1906, express trains began running through to 221st Street, eliminating the need to transfer at this station.

=== Station improvements ===
After the first subway line was completed in 1908, the station was served by West Side local and express trains. Express trains began at South Ferry in Manhattan or Atlantic Avenue in Brooklyn, and ended at 242nd Street in the Bronx. Local trains ran from City Hall to 242nd Street during rush hours, continuing south from City Hall to South Ferry at other times. In 1918, the Broadway–Seventh Avenue Line opened south of Times Square–42nd Street, and the original line was divided into an H-shaped system. The original subway north of Times Square thus became part of the Broadway–Seventh Avenue Line. Local trains were sent to South Ferry, while express trains used the new Clark Street Tunnel to Brooklyn.

To address overcrowding, in 1909, the New York Public Service Commission proposed lengthening the platforms at stations along the original IRT subway. As part of a modification to the IRT's construction contracts made on January 18, 1910, the company was to lengthen station platforms to accommodate ten-car express and six-car local trains. In addition to $1.5 million (equivalent to $51.8 million in 2025) spent on platform lengthening, $500,000 (equivalent to $17.3 million in 2025) was spent on building additional entrances and exits. It was anticipated that these improvements would increase capacity by 25 percent. The northbound platform at the 157th Street station was extended 70 feet (21 m) to the south and 60 feet (18 m) to the north, while the southbound platform was not lengthened. Six-car local trains began operating in October 1910, and ten-car express trains began running on the West Side Line on January 24, 1911. Subsequently, the station could accommodate six-car local trains, but ten-car trains could not open some of their doors.

Work to construct new entrances at the station was 49 percent completed in Fiscal Year 1924.

The city government took over the IRT's operations on June 12, 1940. Platforms at IRT Broadway–Seventh Avenue Line stations between 103rd Street and 238th Street, including those at 157th Street, were lengthened to 514 feet (157 m) between 1946 and 1948, allowing full ten-car express trains to stop at these stations. A contract for the platform extensions at 157th Street and eight other stations on the line was awarded to Spencer, White & Prentis Inc. in October 1946, with an estimated cost of $3.891 million. The platform extensions at these stations were opened in stages. On April 6, 1948, the platform extension at 157th Street opened. At the same time, the IRT routes were given numbered designations with the introduction of "R-type" rolling stock, which contained rollsigns with numbered designations for each service. The route to 242nd Street became known as the 1. In 1959, all 1 trains became local.

As part of its 2025–2029 Capital Program, the MTA has proposed making the station wheelchair-accessible in compliance with the Americans with Disabilities Act of 1990.

== Station layout ==
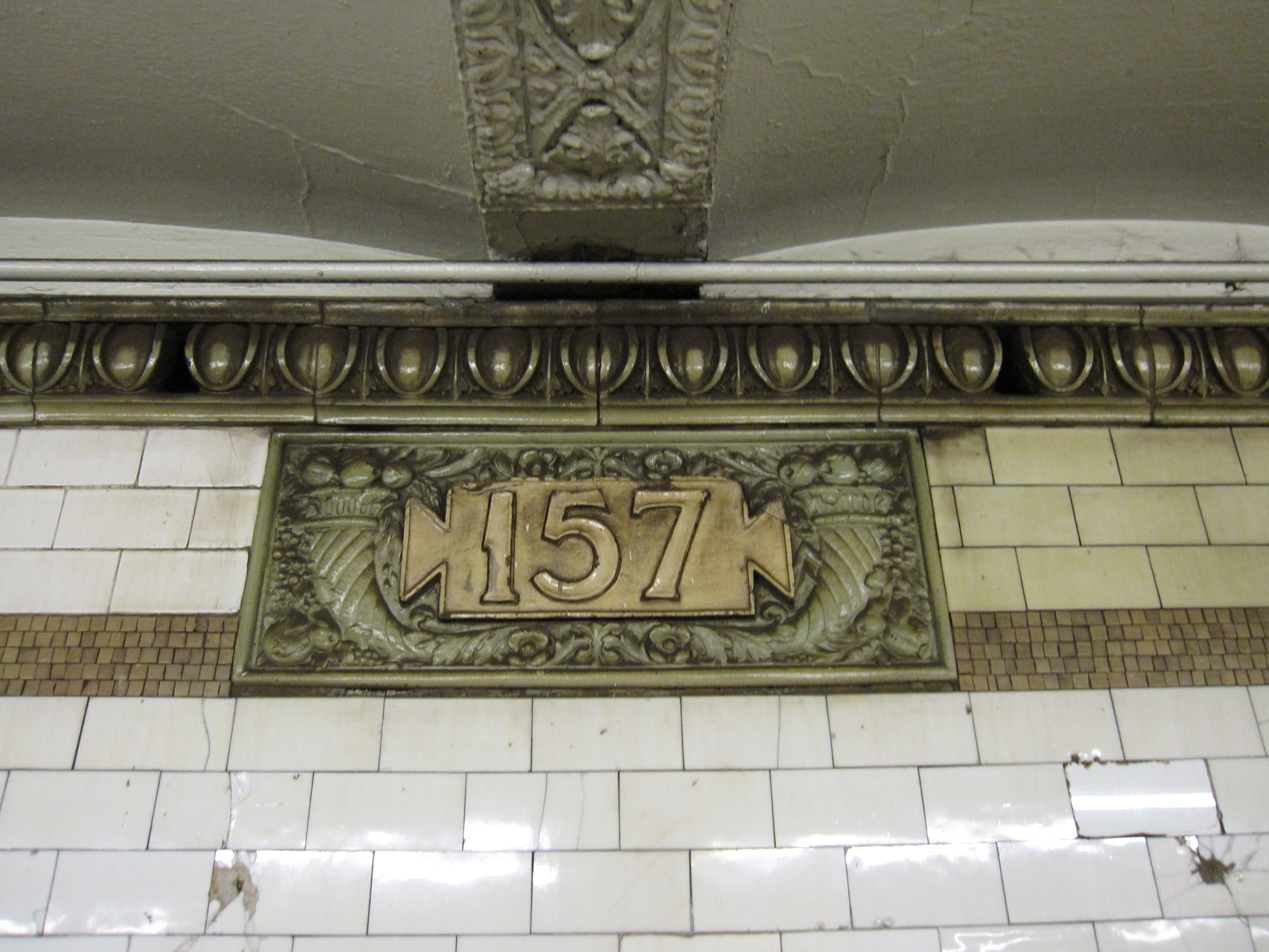
Ceramic cartouche with number "157"

This station was part of the original subway, and has two side platforms and two tracks. The station is served by the 1 at all times and is between 168th Street to the north and 145th Street to the south.

The platforms were originally 350 feet (110 m) long, like at other stations north of 96th Street, but as a result of the 1948 platform extension, became 520 feet (160 m) long. The platform extensions are at the rear ends of the original platforms: the southbound platform was extended northward and the northbound platform was extended southward.

=== Design ===
As with other stations built as part of the original IRT, the station was constructed using a cut-and-cover method. The tunnel is covered by a U-shaped trough that contains utility pipes and wires. This trough contains a foundation of concrete no less than 4 inches (100 mm) thick. Each platform consists of 3-inch-thick (7.6 cm) concrete slabs, beneath which are drainage basins. The original platforms contain I-beam columns spaced every 15 feet (4.6 m). Additional columns between the tracks, spaced every 5 feet (1.5 m), support the jack-arched concrete station roofs. The tiled columns that run along the entire length and contain "157" painted in black. Some of the columns between the tracks have "157" signs in black lettering on white borders. There is a 1-inch (25 mm) gap between the trough wall and the platform walls, which are made of 4-inch (100 mm)-thick brick covered over by a tiled finish.

The decorative scheme consists of blue/green tile tablets; buff tile bands; a green terracotta cornice; and buff terracotta plaques. The mosaic tiles at all original IRT stations were manufactured by the American Encaustic Tile Company, which subcontracted the installations at each station. The decorative work was performed by tile contractor Manhattan Glass Tile Company and terracotta contractor Atlantic Terra Cotta Company. The platforms contain their original trim line that includes "157" mosaics and name tablets reading "157TH ST." There are also directional signs on the tiles containing white lettering on a black background and brown border.

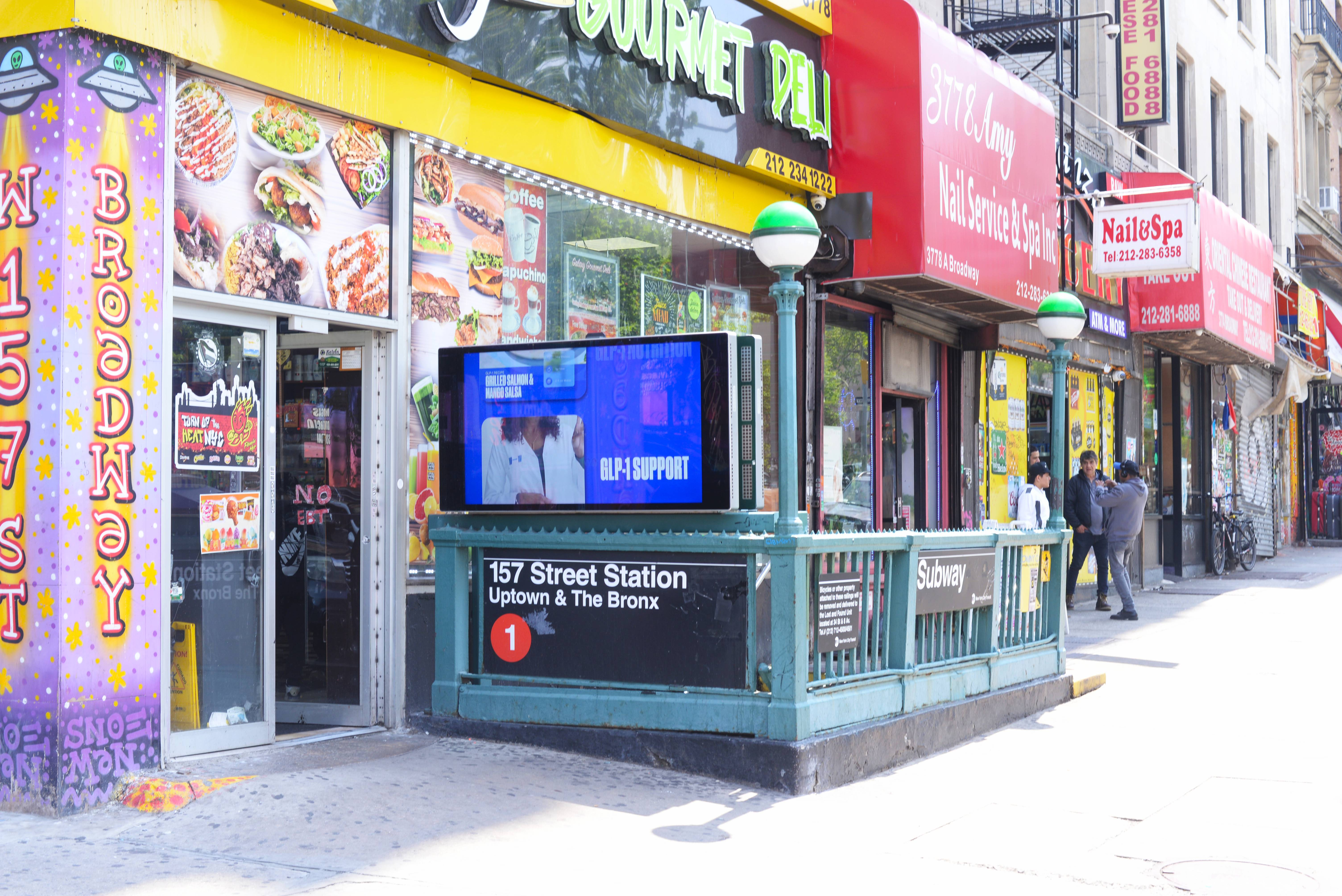
Uptown entrance

=== Exits ===
Each platform has one same-level fare control area near the middle. Both are fully staffed, containing a turnstile bank and token booth, and each has two street stairs. The northbound side's two exits lead to the southeast corner of 157th Street and Broadway, and the southbound side's two exits lead to the northwest corner of the intersection. There are no crossovers or crossunders to allow free transfers between directions. Only the South Ferry-bound side token booth is staffed.
