= Dyckman-Hillside Substation =

Historic place in Manhattan, New York

- Dyckman-Hillside Substation (Substation 17)
- U.S. National Register of Historic Places
- U.S. Historic district – Contributing property
- New York State Register of Historic Places
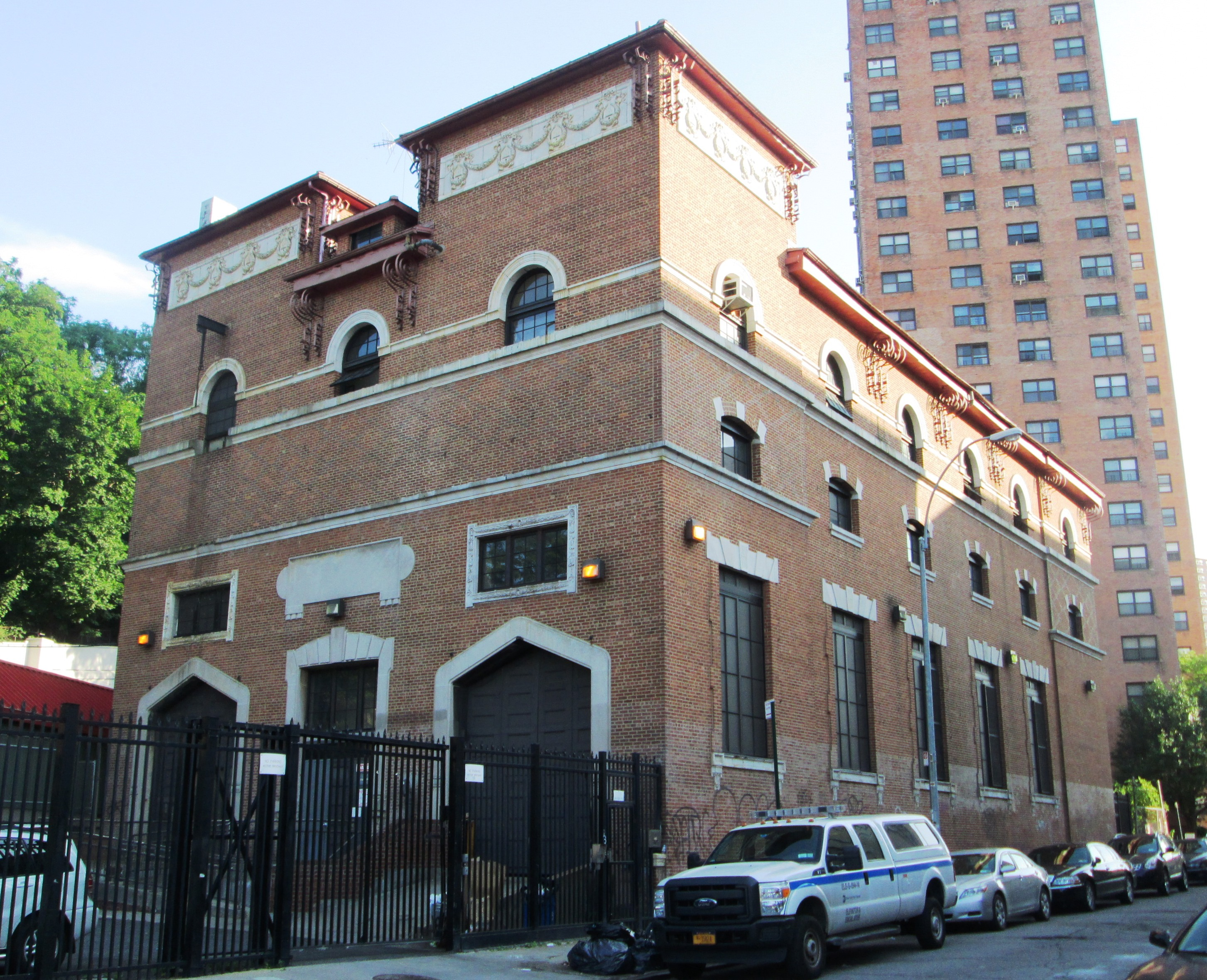
- (2014)

- Location within New York City Location within New York Location within the United States
- Location: 127-129 Hillside Avenue; Inwood, Manhattan, New York City 10040
- Coordinates: 40°51′36″N 73°55′37″W
- Built: 1904-05
- Architectural style: Beaux-Arts
- Part of: Dominican Historic District (ID100011048)
- MPS: New York City Subway System MPS
- NRHP reference No.: 06000025
- NYSRHP No.: 06101.007426

Significant dates
- Added to NRHP: February 9, 2006
- Designated CP: January 24, 2025
- Designated NYSRHP: September 19, 2005

The Dyckman-Hillside Substation, also known as Substation 17, is a historic electrical substation located at 127-129 Hillside Avenue between Sickles Street and Nagle Avenue, near the Dyckman Street station of the New York City Subway's IRT Broadway–Seventh Avenue Line, in Inwood, Manhattan, New York City. It was one of eight substations constructed by the Interborough Rapid Transit Company in 1904–05.

The substation is a two-story, freestanding masonry building in the Beaux-Arts style. It features a hipped roof, tower-like projections, scrolled wrought iron brackets, and terra cotta decorative details.

It was listed on the National Register of Historic Places in 2006.
