= List of New York City Designated Landmarks in Manhattan above 110th Street =

The New York City Landmarks Preservation Commission (LPC), formed in 1965, is the New York City governmental commission that administers the city's Landmarks Preservation Law. Since its founding, it has designated over a thousand landmarks, classified into four categories: individual landmarks, interior landmarks, scenic landmarks, and historic districts.

The New York City borough of Manhattan contains a high concentration of designated landmarks, interior landmarks and historic districts. The section of Manhattan above 110th Street is known as Upper Manhattan. It includes numerous individual landmarks and historic districts, as well as two scenic landmarks. The following is an incomplete list. Some of these are also National Historic Landmark (NHL) sites, and NHL status is noted where known.

Source:;; date listed is date of designation;

== Historic Districts ==
Landmark Name	Date Designated
Audubon Park Historic District	May 12, 2009
Audubon Terrace Historic District	January 9, 1979
Central Harlem - West 130th-132nd Streets Historic District	May 29, 2018
Dorrance Brooks Square Historic District	June 15, 2021
Hamilton Heights Historic District	November 26, 1974; extension: March 28, 2000
Hamilton Heights/Sugar Hill Historic District and Extension	June 27, 2000; extension: October 3, 2001
Hamilton Heights/Sugar Hill Northeast Historic District	October 23, 2001
Hamilton Heights/Sugar Hill Northwest Historic District	June 18, 2002
Jumel Terrace Historic District	August 18, 1970
Morningside Heights Historic District	February 21, 2017
Mount Morris Park Historic District and Extension	November 3, 1971; extension: September 2015
Park Terrace West-West 217th Street Historic District	December 11, 2018
St. Nicholas Historic District	March 16, 1967

== Individual Landmarks ==
=== 1 – 9 ===
Landmark Name	Image	Date Designated
115th Street Branch of the New York Public Library		July 12, 1967
12 West 129th Street House		July 26, 1994
17 East 128th Street House 40°48′29″N 73°56′23.4″W		December 21, 1982
30th Police Precinct Station House (Former) (32nd Police Precinct Station House)		July 15, 1986
155th Street Viaduct		1992
369th Regiment Armory		May 14, 1985
409 Edgecombe Avenue Apartments (Colonial Parkway Apartments)		June 15, 1993
555 Edgecombe Avenue Apartments (Roger Morris Apartments)		June 15, 1993
935 St. Nicholas Avenue		June 27, 2023

=== A – M ===
Landmark Name	Image	Date Designated
Abyssinian Baptist Church and Community House		July 13, 1993
Apollo Theater (Hurtig & Seamon's New (Burlesque) Theater)		June 28, 1983
Astor Row (8-62 (even) West 130th Street Houses)		August 11, 1981, , , , , , , , , , , , , , , , , , , , , , , , , , ,
James A. and Ruth M. Bailey House		February 19, 1974
Nicholas C. and Agnes Benziger House		January 12, 1999
Casa Italiana		March 28, 1978
Cathedral Church of St. John the Divine and the Cathedral Close		February 21, 2017
Chapel of the Intercession		August 16, 1966
Chapel of the Intercession Vicarage		August 16, 1966
Church of All Saints (Roman Catholic), Parish House and School		January 30, 2006
Church of Notre Dame		January 24, 1967
Church of Notre Dame Rectory, 405 West 114th Street 40°48′18.3″N 73°57′38.7″W		January 24, 1967
Church of St. Joseph of the Holy Family, 401-403 West 125th Street		June 28, 2016
City College of New York, North Campus		May 26, 1981
Claremont Theater Building		June 6, 2006
Cloisters, The (Metropolitan Museum of Art) (CB12)		March 19, 1974
Croton Aqueduct Gate House		March 23, 1981
Croton Aqueduct West 119th Street Gatehouse		March 28, 2000
Dunbar Apartments		July 14, 1970
Dyckman House		July 12, 1967
Fire Engine Company No. 47 (502 West 113th Street)		June 17, 1997
Fire Engine Company No. 67 (518 West 170th Street)		February 27, 2001
Fire Engine Company No. 84 and Hook & Ladder Company No. 34 (513-515 West 161st Street)		June 17, 1997
Fire Hook & Ladder Company No. 14 (Fire Engine Company No. 36) (120 East 125th Street)		June 17, 1997
Fort Washington Presbyterian Church		May 12, 2009
Benjamin Franklin High School (now Manhattan Center for Science and Mathematics), 260 Pleasant Avenue		March 27, 2018
General Grant National Memorial		November 25, 1975
Graham Court Apartments		October 16, 1984
Hamilton Grange		August 2, 1967
Hamilton Theater (Former) (Broadway & West 146th Street) 40°49′37.5″N 73°56′58″W		February 8, 2000
Harlem Courthouse		August 2, 1967
Harlem River Houses		September 23, 1975
High Bridge, Aqueduct, and Pedestrian Walk		November 10, 1970
Highbridge Play Center		April 14, 2007
Historic Street Lampposts		June 17, 1997
Hotel Cecil and Minton's Playhouse		June 27, 2023
Holyrood Episcopal Church		May 18, 2021
Hotel Theresa (Theresa Towers)		July 13, 1993
Langston Hughes House		August 11, 1981
IRT Broadway Line Viaduct (Manhattan Valley Viaduct)		November 21, 1981
Jeffrey's Hook Lighthouse ("Little Red Lighthouse")		May 14, 1991
Loew's 175th Street Theatre (4140 Broadway)		December 13, 2016
Joseph Loth & Company Silk Ribbon Mill (500 West 151st Street at Amsterdam Avenue) 40°49′44.3″N 73°56′43″W		September 21, 1993
Low Memorial Library, Columbia University		September 20, 1966
Macombs Dam Bridge (Central Bridge) and 155th Street Viaduct		January 14, 1992
Metropolitan Baptist Church (New York City) (New York Presbyterian Church) (151 West 128th Street)		February 3, 1981
Morris-Jumel Mansion		July 12, 1967
Mother African Methodist Episcopal Zion Church		July 13, 1993
Mount Morris Bank Building (Corn Exchange Bank, Mount Morris Branch) (81-85 East 125th Street at Park Avenue)		January 5, 1993
Mount Olive Fire Baptized Holiness Church (Second Reformed Presbyterian Church (Former)) (304-308 West 122nd Street) 40.8085°N 73.9535°W		June 23, 2009

=== N – Z ===
Landmark Name	Image	Date Designated
New York Public Library, 125th Street Branch		January 13, 2009
New York Public Library, Aguilar Branch (174 East 110th Street) 40.7943°N 73.9434°W		June 25, 1996
New York Public Library, George Bruce Branch (518 West 125th Street) 40.8138°N 73.957°W		January 13, 2009
New York Public Library, Hamilton Grange Branch		March 31, 1970
New York Public Library, Harlem Branch		June 15, 2021
New York Training School for Teachers/New York Model School (later A. Philip Randolph Campus High School) (443 West 135th Street) 40.8183°N 73.950°W		June 24, 1997
Our Lady of Lourdes Roman Catholic Church 472 West 142nd Street 40°49′23.5″N 73°56′54″W		July 22, 1975
Plant and Scrymser Pavilions for Private Patients, St. Luke's Hospital (St. Luke's-Roosevelt Hospital Center) (401 West 113th Street & 400 West 114th Street) 40.8045°N 73.9605°W		June 18, 2002
Regent Theater (First Corinthian Baptist Church), 1910 Adam Clayton Powell Jr. Boulevard		March 8, 1994
Riverside Church		May 16, 2000
Jackie Robinson (Colonial Park) Play Center		April 10, 2007
St. Aloysius Roman Catholic Church, New York (209 West 132nd Street)		January 30, 2007
St. Andrew's Church		April 12, 1967
St. Martin's Episcopal Church 40°48′20″N 73°56′48″W		July 19, 1966
St. Martin's Episcopal Church Rectory, 18 W122 St 40°48′20″N 73°56′46.2″W		July 19, 1966
St. Mary Protestant Episcopal Church (Manhattanville), Parish House, and Sunday School (521 West 126th St) 40°48′53.5″N 73°57′22″W		May 19, 1998
Saint Paul Roman Catholic Church (now Parish of St. Paul and Holy Rosary), 121 East 117th Street		June 28, 2016
St. Paul's Chapel (Columbia University)		September 20, 1966
St. Paul's German Evangelical Lutheran Church (Former) (12th Church of Christ, Scientist; Greater Metropolitan Baptist Church, 147 West 123rd Street) 40°48′27″N 73°56′54″W		March 8, 1994
St. Philip's Episcopal Church		July 13, 1993
Schomburg Collection for Research in Black Culture (West 135th Street Branch Library)		February 3, 1981
Thomas Jefferson Play Center		July 24, 2007
Union Theological Seminary: Brown Memorial Tower, James Tower & James Memorial Chapel		November 15, 1967
University Heights Bridge		September 11, 1984
Wadleigh High School for Girls (Wadleigh School, 215 West 114th Street) 40°48′9″N 73°57′15″W		July 26, 1994
Washington Apartments (Seventh Avenue & 122nd Street) 40°48′25″N 73°57′1″W		January 5, 1993
Washington Bridge		September 14, 1982
Watch Tower 40.804097°N 73.94357°W		July 12, 1967
Water Tower 40.84245°N 73.03167°W		July 12, 1967
Webber Packing House (207-215 East 119th Street)		March 27, 2018
Young Men's Christian Association (YMCA) Building, 135th Street (Harlem) Branch (180 West 135th Street)		February 10, 1998
Young Men's Christian Association (YMCA) Building, West 135th Street Branch (now Jackie Robinson YMCA Youth Center) (181 West 135th Street)		December 13, 2016

== Interior Landmarks ==
Landmark Name	Image	Date Designated
Apollo Theater (Hurtig & Seamon's New (Burlesque) Theater), First Floor Interior		June 28, 1983
General Grant National Memorial Interior		November 23, 1975
Jackie Robinson (Colonial Park) Play Center Bath House Interior, First Floor Interior		April 10, 2007
Low Memorial Library Interior, Main Floor Interior		February 3, 1981
Morris-Jumel Mansion, First Floor Interior		May 27, 1975

== Scenic Landmarks ==
Landmark Name	Date Designated
Fort Tryon Park	September 20, 1983
Morningside Park	July 15, 2008

== See also ==
- List of New York City Designated Landmarks in Manhattan below 14th Street
- List of New York City Designated Landmarks in Manhattan from 14th to 59th Streets
- List of New York City Designated Landmarks in Manhattan from 59th to 110th Streets
- National Register of Historic Places listings in New York County, New York
- List of National Historic Landmarks in New York City
