= Duke Ellington House =

Historic building in Manhattan, New York

- U.S. National Register of Historic Places
- U.S. National Historic Landmark
- U.S. Historic district – Contributing property
- New York State Register of Historic Places
- New York City Landmark
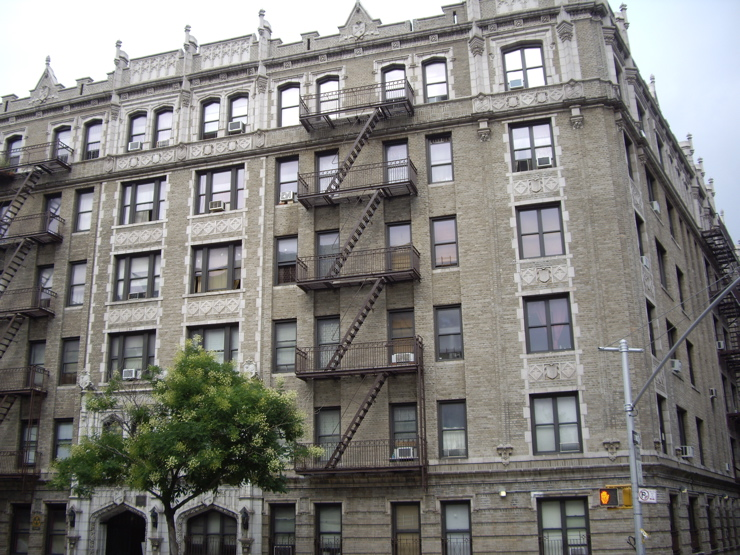
- Interactive map of Duke Ellington House
- Location: 935 St. Nicholas Avenue, Manhattan, New York City, New York
- Coordinates: 40°49′56″N 73°56′28″W
- Built: 1915
- Architectural style: Late Gothic Revival
- Part of: Dominican Historic District (ID100011048)
- NRHP reference No.: 76001239
- NYSRHP No.: 06101.001796
- NYCL No.: 2670

Significant dates
- Added to NRHP: May 11, 1976
- Designated NHL: May 11, 1976
- Designated CP: January 24, 2025
- Designated NYSRHP: June 23, 1980
- Designated NYCL: June 27, 2023

The Duke Ellington House is a historic residence at 935 St. Nicholas Avenue, in Manhattan, New York City. Apartment 4A in this apartment house was the home of Duke Ellington (1899–1974), the noted African American composer and jazz pianist, from 1939 through 1961. It was listed on the National Register of Historic Places as a National Historic Landmark in 1976, and became a New York City designated landmark in 2023.

== Description and history ==
935 St. Nicholas Avenue is located in Upper Manhattan's Washington Heights neighborhood, at the southwest corner of St. Nicholas Avenue and 157th Street. It is a six-story masonry structure, built in 1915 in the Late Gothic Revival style. The ground floor appears as a raised basement, with horizontal bands of stonework between its windows. The middle four floors are essentially identical, with some columns of window bays featuring decorative carved panels between the floors. Top-floor windows are set in peaked-arch openings and have more elaborate surrounds. The building is crowned by a parapet with stone turrets and projections. A pair of entrance bays are located at the center of the St. Nicholas facade, the entrances deeply recessed in peaked-arch openings.

When Duke Ellington moved into Apartment A4 in this building in 1939, he was already a well-known musician with a national reputation. It was during his period of his residency here that he wrote a number of his most important compositions, including Black, Brown and Beige, his first major extended-length jazz composition for chorus and orchestra. During this period, Ellington's music and personal style had a major impact on African-American culture specifically, as well as broader cultural trends in music.

== See also ==
- List of National Historic Landmarks in New York City
- List of New York City Designated Landmarks in Manhattan above 110th Street
- National Register of Historic Places listings in Manhattan above 110th Street
