= Nicholas Teliatnikow =

Russian-American photographer and photojournalist

Nicholai Teliatnikow
- Born: Nicholai Teliatnikow; 15 May 1909; Russia
- Died: July 3, 1970 (aged 61); New York City
- Known for: Photography

Nicholai, Nikolaj, or Nicholas Pavlovich Teliatnikow (Russian: Николай Павлович Телятников; May 15, 1909 – July 3, 1970) was a Russian photographer and photojournalist based in New York City. He was renowned for his portrayal of Russian-American life in New York City, depicting social as well as historical issues such as the White Emigre.

== Career ==
Teliatnikow received much attention for his portrayal of Russian-American life in New York City, particularly his depiction of the White Emigre. He was the main photographer for the Russian Orthodox Church Outside Russia from 1940 to 1960; he photographed Russian-American events such as weddings, christenings, balls, conferences and demonstrations. He also photographed several clergymen of the Eastern Orthodox Church.

Teliatnikow signed his photographs with a white, hand-written watermark, "Photo by N. Teliatnikow". He owned two studios, which he eventually combined in his Hamilton Heights apartment, where he stored over 50,000 photographs (including the negatives).

== Sources ==
- In the name of Russia: photography by N. Teliatnikow. New York: Russia Abroad Publishing House. 1965.
