= 32nd Police Precinct Station =

Building in Manhattan, New York

- 32nd Police Precinct Station House Complex
- U.S. National Register of Historic Places
- U.S. Historic district – Contributing property
- New York State Register of Historic Places
- New York City Landmark
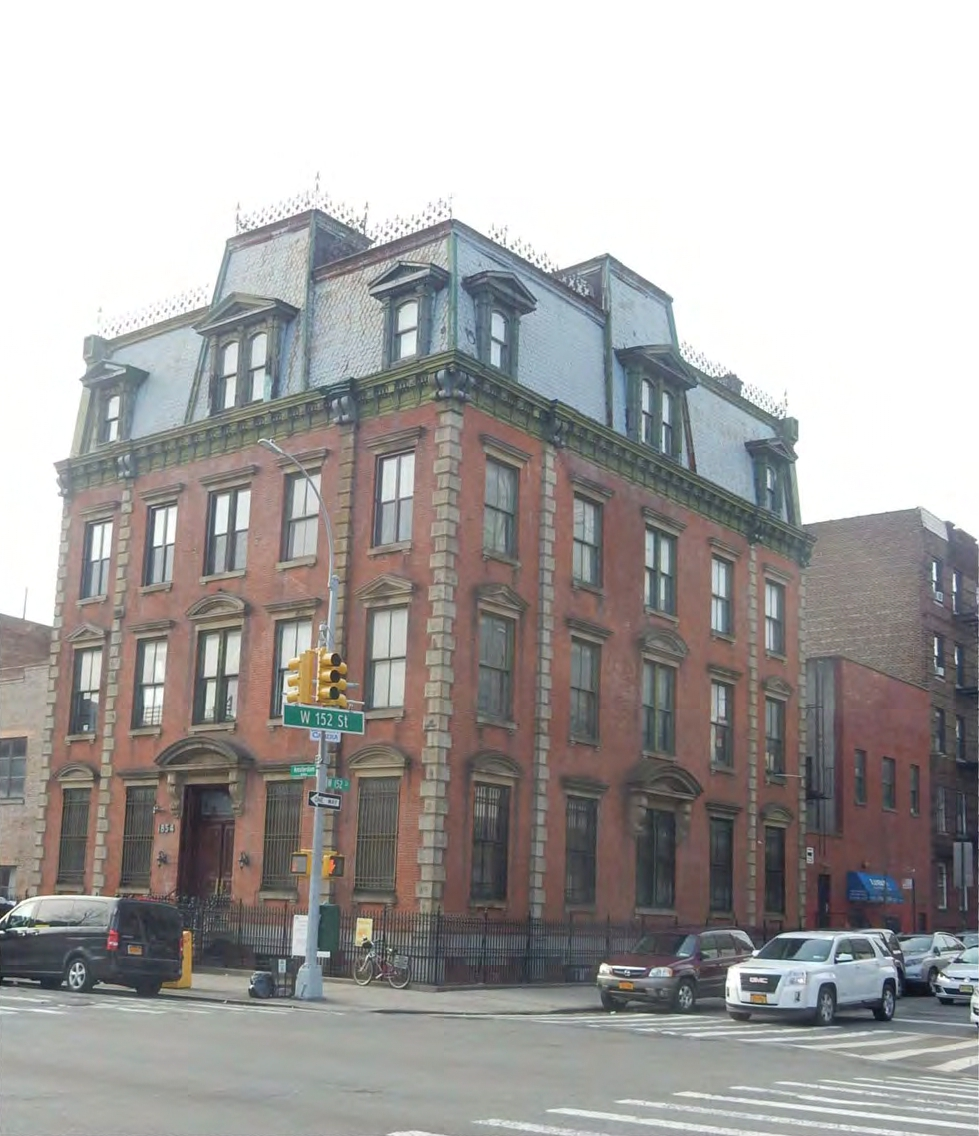

- Location within Manhattan Location within New York City Location within New York Location within the United States
- Location: 1850–1854 Amsterdam Avenue, Manhattan, New York, US
- Coordinates: 40°49′47″N 73°56′41″W
- Area: 0.24 acres (0.097 ha)
- Architect: Nathaniel D. Bush
- Part of: West Harlem Historic District (ID100008341)
- NRHP reference No.: 100004243
- NYSRHP No.: 06101.013137, 06101.020857
- NYCL No.: 2034

Significant dates
- Added to NRHP: 2019-08-08
- Designated NYSRHP: 2019-06-14
- Designated NYCL: 1986-07-15

The 32nd Police Precinct Station is a former New York City Police Department (NYPD) police station at 1850–1854 Amsterdam Avenue, at the intersection with 152nd Street, in the Hamilton Heights neighborhood of Manhattan, New York City, United States. Built in 1871 or 1872, it was designed by Nathaniel D. Bush, the in-house architect for the NYPD. The main building was designed in the French Second Empire style and has four stories and a basement. The 152nd Street and Amsterdam Avenue elevations of the facade are nearly identical, with brick facades, sandstone and granite decorations, central pavilions, and mansard roofs. The interior preserves several original 19th-century elements. The complex also includes a two-story prison (connected to the main building by a one-story wing), as well as an attached garage.

The building served the 32nd (later 30th) Precinct of the NYPD from its completion until 1975. The precinct's original building, constructed on land acquired in 1864, was at the same intersection as the current building. The garage was constructed on the site of the original stable in 1926. After the NYPD moved out, the main building was sold to the St. Luke African Methodist Episcopal Church, while the garage was split into separate ownership. The main building is a New York City designated landmark, and the entire complex is listed on the National Register of Historic Places.

== Description ==
The New York City Police Department's (NYPD) former 32nd Precinct Station House is located at 1850–1854 Amsterdam Avenue in the Hamilton Heights neighborhood of Manhattan, New York City, United States. It consists of a main building at the southwestern corner of Amsterdam Avenue and West 152nd Street, along with an attached garage. The site originally measured 100 by 100 feet (30 m × 30 m) across, occupying the size of four standard land lots. The street-corner location is unusual, as many NYPD station houses of the era were built with frontage in the middle of a city block.

=== Main building ===
The main building was designed by Nathaniel D. Bush, the in-house architect for the NYPD, in the French Second Empire style. The building has four stories and a basement. Stylistically, it is similar to a precinct house Bush designed for the 14th Precinct on Mulberry Street in Lower Manhattan. The AIA Guide to New York City wrote of the architecture in 2000, "A wonderful Victorian relic—long may it serve!" Another writer said the building was the most conspicuous in the area when it was completed in the early 1870s. The New York Times said the building had "no little pretense of elegance in the black walnut finish".

==== Exterior ====
The northern (152nd Street) and eastern (Amsterdam Avenue) elevations of the facade are identical, except that the central first-floor opening of each elevation is occupied by a window on 152nd Street and by a door on Amsterdam Avenue. The facade of these elevations' first through third stories is made of red brick and is split vertically into five bays. Each bay has a single window on each story. The inner three bays of each elevation form a pavilion, which protrudes slightly from the outer two bays on each elevation. There are vertical sandstone quoins separating the central pavilions from the outer bays, as well as at the corners. The quoins are variously smooth or textured on the upper stories.

On both Amsterdam Avenue and 152nd Street, a wrought iron fence separates the sidewalk from a recessed areaway, behind which is a full basement. The basement level on Amsterdam Avenue has four windows on Amsterdam Avenue, red-brick facing, granite trim, and rusticated blocks with projecting pyramidal motifs. Similar design details are used on 152nd Street except that one window has been infilled. A granite belt course runs horizontally above the basement. On Amsterdam Avenue, a stone stoop ascends to the central entrance, which has double wood-paneled doors. The pediment above the doors is variously cited as round-arched or segmental arched and has dentils and brackets under it.

On the Amsterdam Avenue and 152nd Street elevations, the first story has taller windows than the other stories, with round-arched or segmentally-arched pediments. The second-story windows have triangular pediments, while the lintels above the third-story windows are flat. The openings mostly retain their original wooden sash windows, laid out in a two-over-two configuration, though aluminum replacement windows exist on the third floor. The west and south elevations are only partially visible above the neighboring buildings. The west elevation has four bays of wood-framed windows, a chimney shaft, and a fire escape. The south elevation is a party wall with a painted brick facade; it is windowless, except on the third and fourth stories, where a recessed light court has wood sash windows.

A pressed-metal cornice, decorated with ornaments such as bosses, brackets, dentils, and cap moldings, runs horizontally above the third story. The top of the building's mansard roof is lined with highly ornate iron cresting, along with finials at the building's corners. The central portions of the roof protrude above, and forward from, the rest of the roof.

==== Interior ====
The original layout of the police station was chronicled in an 1885 book about the NYPD's history. The captain and sergeants worked at ground level. Entering from the eastern or Amsterdam (Tenth) Avenue end, there were a captain's room, office, and sergeant's desk from south (left) to north (right). Toward the rear was a waiting room and sergeants' offices. A curved stair on the south wall ascends to the upper stories. Plans indicate that there was supposed to be another entrance from 152nd Street, which seems not to have ever been built. The upper floors had dormitories known as "section rooms" where police officers slept while on duty.

The interior preserves several original 19th-century elements. The entry vestibule has multi-paneled double doors. The staircase has wooden balustrades and a ceiling skylight. Large upper-floor spaces mirror the layout of the original police dormitories.

=== Adjoining structures ===
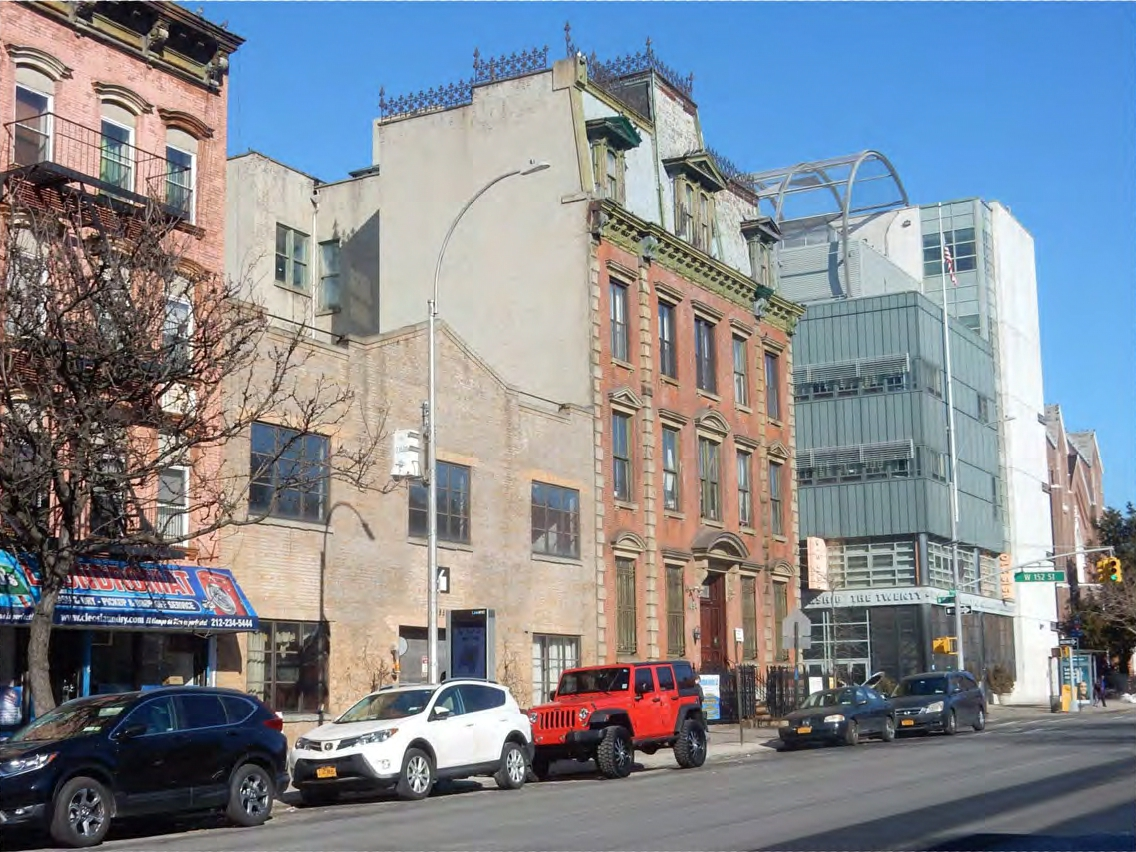
The garage (left) on Amsterdam Avenue, south of the main building (center right)

The two-story jail, west of the station house, was built at the same time as the main building. It is located on 152nd Street. It has a painted brick facade measuring three bays wide; there are stone windowsills and brick lintels above the second-story windows. The jail is connected to the main station house by a one-story passageway, which has a door accessed by a stoop.

When the main building was completed, there was originally a standalone two-story horse stable, separated from the main building by a courtyard. The garage, south of the station house, was converted from the precinct's old stables between 1925 and 1926. Designed by NYPD architect Thomas E. O'Brien, it has two stories plus a basement and has a beige brick facade measuring three bays wide. It has large rectangular window openings, along with a central vehicular entrance and a stepped parapet on the rooftop with a pediment at the center. The interior consists mostly of open spaces with a cast-iron staircase, steel columns encased in concrete, and walls and an elevator shaft made of brick. It was originally connected to the station house at the first story and basement, though these connections have been sealed.

== History ==
The station house was built for the 32nd Precinct, which spanned a large part of Upper Manhattan bounded by the Harlem River to the east, 145th Street to the south, the North River (Hudson River) to the west, and Dyckman Street to the north. This area overlaps with four modern-day NYPD precincts in North Harlem and Washington Heights, but, in the 19th century, was sparsely settled. The site of the precinct's first recorded home was acquired in 1864; the building on this site rose three stories, with a brick facade. This building was on Tenth (now Amsterdam) Avenue and 152nd Street. This precinct house had an adjacent stable but, because of the area's very low crime rates, lacked a jail. By 1869, a "new and more commodious" building was being planned for the precinct.

=== Police station ===
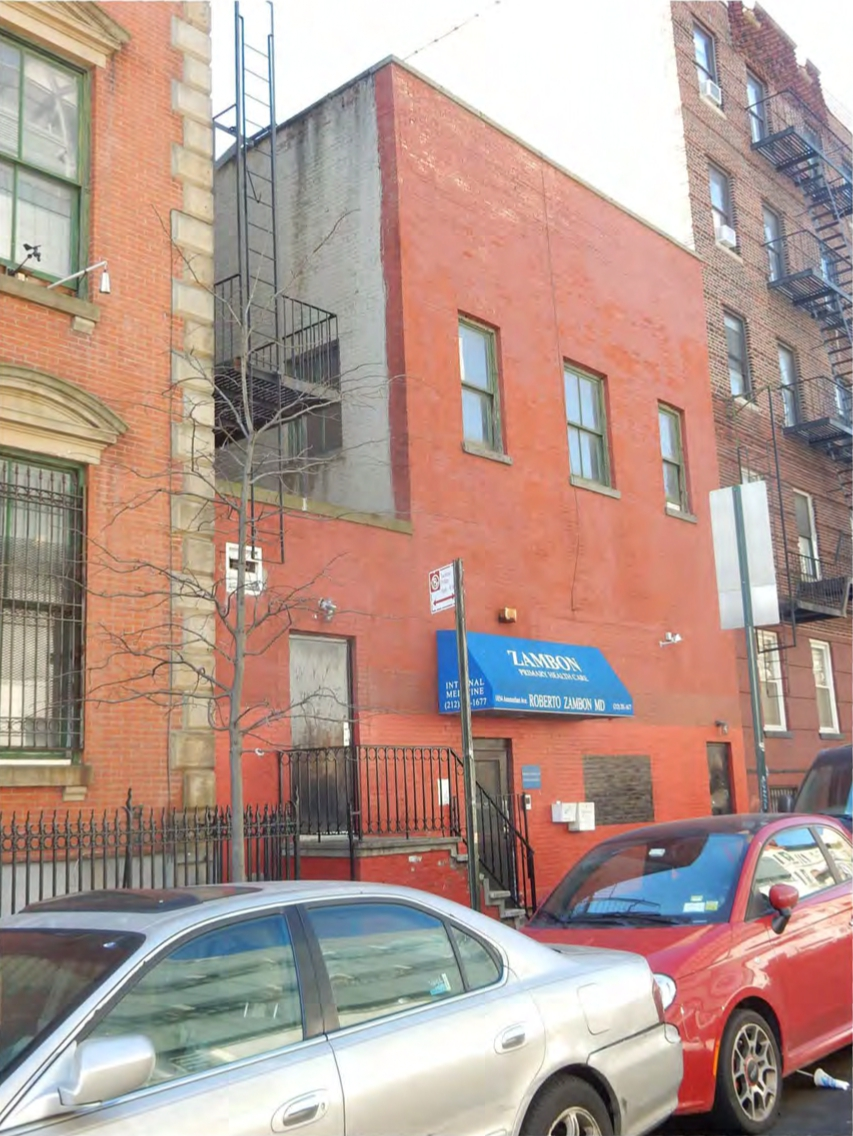
The jail

The building was completed in 1871 or 1872. Designed by architect Nathaniel D. Bush, the new precinct building rose four stories with a brick, sandstone, and granite facade with a mansard roof. Like many other buildings designed by its architect Nathaniel Bush, it had a central pavilion known as a frontispiece. The new station house occupied the village center of what was then the village of Carmansville. The station house had offices for the captain and sergeants, while patrol officers patrolled a beat, keeping in contact with the station house staff. Since officers often went on duty for consecutive days, they sometimes slept in the building between shifts, so the building incorporated a dormitory. The precinct employed mounted police, requiring a horse stable to be built as well. There was also a jail where officers detained those awaiting arraignment. The jail and the main building's basement originally also housed homeless people until 1896, when the responsibility of caring for the homeless was rescinded from the NYPD.

One account from 1885 called the building "snug in winter, and a charming, breezy resort in summer". At the time, the precinct was rural and recorded very little crime, encompassing various institutions, rural country estates, and the area around Highbridge Park. Between 1885 and 1900, staffing grew from 78 to 138 officers. The building was deficient by 1900; surveys in the first two decades of the 20th century recommended installing electric lights, metal ceilings, proper ventilation, and updated restroom facilities. The precinct's original telegraph boxes, which the public could use to communicate with staff in the station house, were replaced in 1903 by Bell Telephone call boxes, then in 1913 with new boxes that activated green lights and bells.

With high-density development in the district beginning in the late 19th century, the area covered by the precinct was also reduced, as new precincts were split off the old 32nd Precinct. The horse stable also became a garage in the early 20th century after the NYPD began replacing its horses with motorized vehicles. NYPD Architect Lieutenant Thomas E. O'Brien designed a new garage in 1925, replacing the original stable. Work began the following February, when the NYPD began constructing a simple, utilitarian brick garage, occupying the site of both the stable and the land lot. The 32nd Precinct became the 30th when the outer boroughs' police precincts were merged into the NYPD in 1929. By World War II, the precinct protected a densely-developed area that was populated primarily by Hispanic and African Americans. Crime in the precinct had increased significantly by the 1960s, prompting protests at the station house by local residents.

=== Later use ===
The station house closed in 1975. A new station house was built nearby on 151st Street, one of several new precinct houses to be built in Upper Manhattan in the 1960s and 1970s. By then, the old building was functionally obsolete, with design features such as dormitories being outdated. The city placed the old station house for auction in 1983. Ownership of the complex was divided in 1984 when St. Luke African Methodist Episcopal Church (St. Luke AME) bought the main building; the city government retained ownership of the garage. The main building was designated as a New York City landmark by the New York City Landmarks Preservation Commission on July 15, 1986.

By the 1990s, St. Luke AME had spent $600,000 repairing the main building, but further work had stalled until the church could raise another $750,000. The renovation was completed by 2000, and the main building was being used by the church's Self-Help Program. The city sold the garage in 2003. The 32nd Precinct Station House was nominated for inclusion on the National Register of Historic Places in 2019. It was added to the NRHP on August 8 of that year and was also added to the New York State Register of Historic Places. At the time, the garage was planned to be used as a community space, while the jail was used as a medical office. By 2025, the garage was a coworking space known as Harlem Collective.

== See also ==
- List of New York City Designated Landmarks in Manhattan above 110th Street
- National Register of Historic Places listings in Manhattan above 110th Street

== Sources ==
- 32nd Police Precinct Station House (PDF) (Report). New York City Landmarks Preservation Commission. July 15, 1986.
- 32nd Police Precinct Station House Complex (Report). National Register of Historic Places, National Park Service. August 8, 2019. Report hosted on cris.parks.ny.gov (On "Search" tab: Criteria → Lookup → National Register number: 19NR00014 → NR Nomination Form).
- Costello, Augustine E. (1885). Our Police Protectors: History of the New York Police from the Earliest Period to the Present Time. Costello.
- Whalen, Bernard; Whalen, Jon (2014). The NYPD's First Fifty Years: Politicians, Police Commissioners, and Patrolmen. Potomac Books. ISBN 978-1-61234-656-4.
