= Hamilton Heights, Manhattan =

Neighborhood in New York City

Hamilton Heights
- Neighborhood of Manhattan
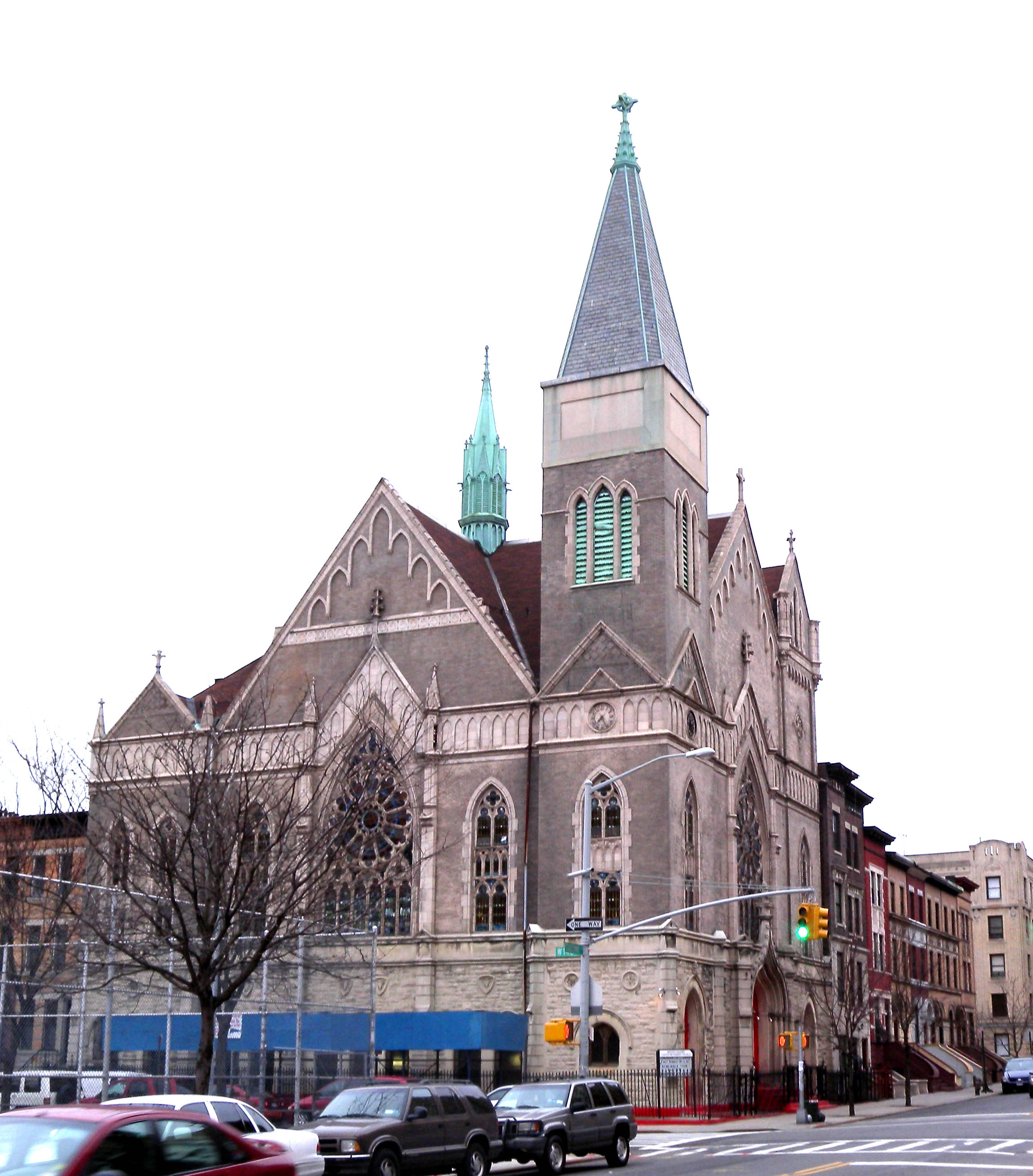
- St. Mark's United Methodist Church
- Interactive map of Hamilton Heights
- Coordinates: 40.825°N 73.949°W
- Country: United States
- State: New York
- City: New York City
- Borough: Manhattan
- Community District: Manhattan 9

Area
  - Total: 0.416 sq mi (1.08 km^{2})

Population (2016)
  - Total: 47,531
  - Density: 114,000/sq mi (44,100/km^{2})

Ethnicity
  - Hispanic: 52.2%
  - Black: 32.2
  - White: 10.9
  - Asian: 2.2
  - Others: 2.6

Economics
  - Median income: $43,673
- Time zone: UTC−5 (Eastern)
  - Summer (DST): UTC−4 (EDT)
- ZIP Codes: 10031, 10032, 10039
- Area code: 212, 332, 646, and 917
- West Harlem Historic District
- U.S. National Register of Historic Places
- U.S. Historic district
- Location within New York City Location within New York
- Location: 135th to 153rd Streets between Amsterdam Avenue and Riverside Drive, Manhattan, New York
- Area: 154.08 acres (62.35 ha)
- NRHP reference No.: 100008341
- Added to NRHP: November 10, 2022

Hamilton Heights is a neighborhood in the northern part of Manhattan in New York City. It is the northernmost part of the West Harlem area, along with Manhattanville and Morningside Heights to its south, and it contains the sub-neighborhood and historic district of Sugar Hill. Washington Heights lies to Hamilton Heights' north, and to its east is Central Harlem.

Hamilton Heights is bounded by 135th Street to the south, Riverside Drive to the west, 155th Street to the north, and Edgecombe Avenue and Saint Nicholas Avenue to the east. The community derives its name from Founding Father Alexander Hamilton, who lived the last two years of his life in what is now the Hamilton Grange National Memorial, back when Upper Manhattan was mostly farmland.

Hamilton Heights is part of Manhattan Community District 9, and its primary ZIP Codes are 10031, 10032, and 10039. It is patrolled by the 30th Precinct of the New York City Police Department.

== Demographics ==
Based on data from the 2010 United States census, the population of Hamilton Heights was 48,520, a decrease of 2,035 (4.0%) from the 50,555 counted in 2000. Covering an area of 367.41 acres (148.69 ha), the neighborhood had a population density of 132.1 inhabitants per acre (84,500/sq mi; 32,600/km^{2}). The racial makeup of the neighborhood was 10.9% (5,287) White, 32.2% (15,646) African American, 0.2% (119) Native American, 2.2% (1,067) Asian, 0.0% (15) Pacific Islander, 0.4% (178) from other races, and 1.8% (884) from two or more races. Hispanic or Latino of any race were 52.2% (25,324) of the population.

The most significant changes in the racial composition of Hamilton Heights from 2000 to 2010 were the increase in the White population by 231% (3,691) and the decrease in the Black population by 26% (5,366). The Hispanic / Latino population also decreased by 2% (648) but remained the majority. Meanwhile, the Asian population increased by 90% (506) but remained a small minority, and the small population of all other races decreased by 15% (218).

The entirety of Community District 9, which consists of Hamilton Heights, Manhattanville, and Morningside Heights, had 111,287 inhabitants as of NYC Health's 2018 Community Health Profile, with an average life expectancy of 81.4 years. This is about the same as the median life expectancy of 81.2 for all New York City neighborhoods. Most residents are children and middle-aged adults: 34% are between the ages of 25–44, while 21% are between 45 and 64, and 17% are between 0–17. The ratio of college-aged and elderly residents was lower, at 16% and 12% respectively.

As of 2017, the median household income in Community District 9 was $50,048, though the median income in Hamilton Heights individually was $43,673. In 2018, an estimated 24% of Community District 9 residents lived in poverty, compared to 14% in all of Manhattan and 20% in all of New York City. One in twelve residents (8%) were unemployed, compared to 7% in Manhattan and 9% in New York City. Rent burden, or the percentage of residents who had difficulty paying their rent, was 51% in Community District 9, compared to the boroughwide and citywide rates of 45% and 51% respectively. Based on this calculation, as of 2018, Community District 9 was considered to be gentrifying: according to the Community Health Profile, the district was low-income in 1990 and saw above-median rent growth up to 2010.

== Housing and diversity ==
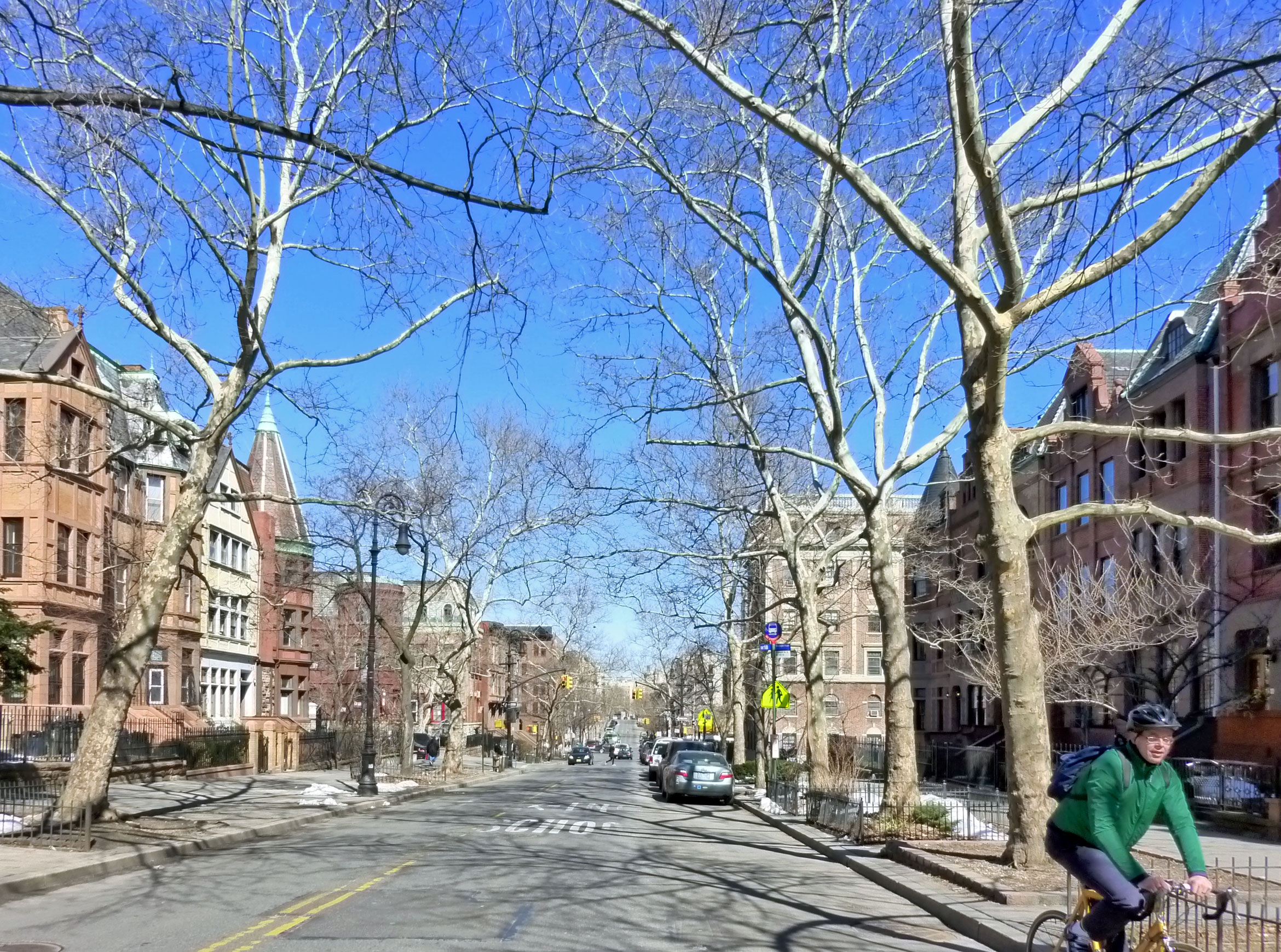
Convent Avenue in Hamilton Heights

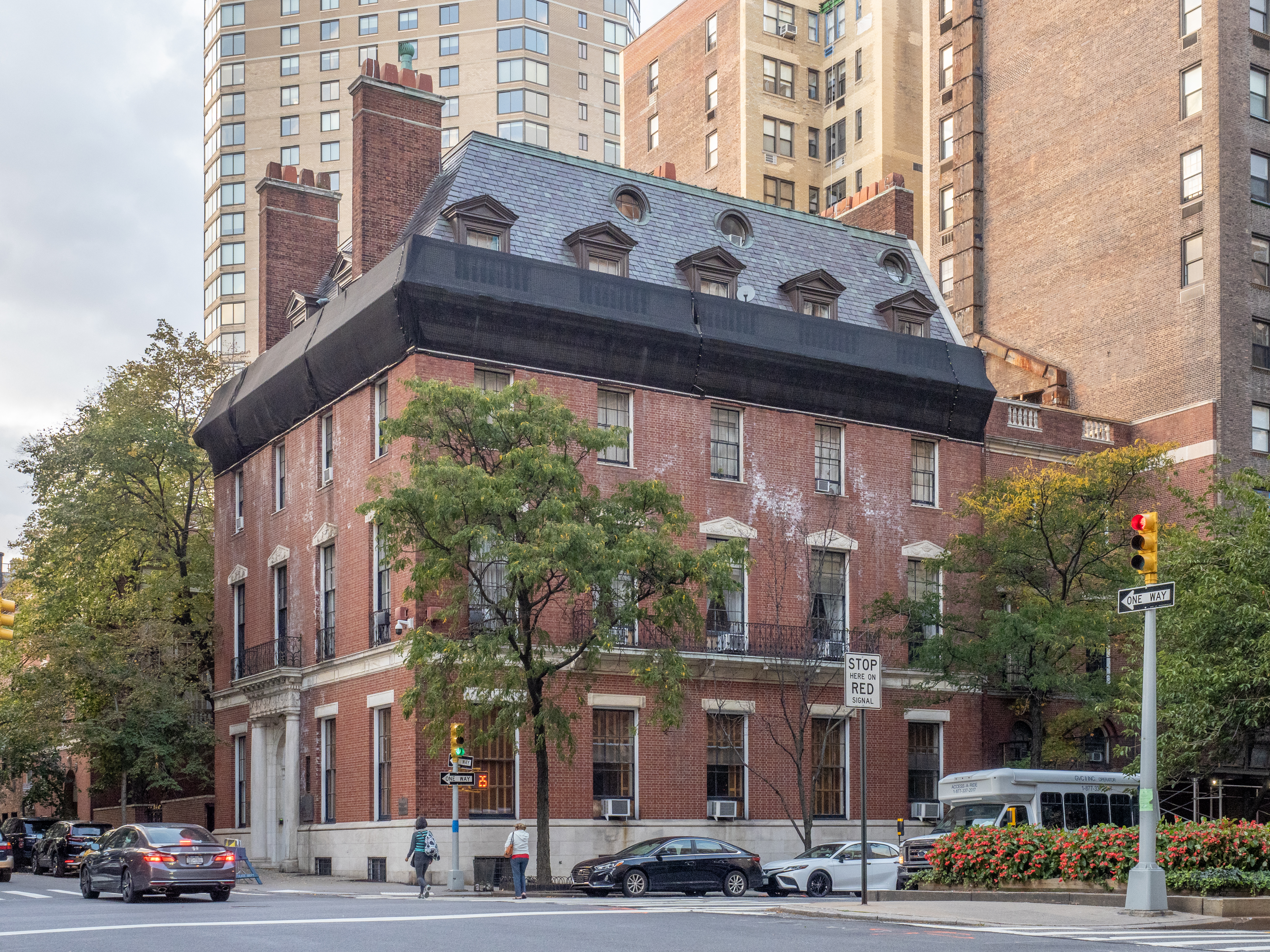
The Holy Fathers Russian Orthodox Church Russian Orthodox Church Outside Russia

Most of the housing dates from the extension of the elevated and subway lines at the end of the 19th and the start of the 20th century. This fairly elegant housing became less desirable to white residents in the 1930s and 1940s as the population changed from white to black, even though the black residents were just as affluent as the white residents. There are spacious apartment buildings, brownstones, and other row houses prominently lining the leafy eastern streets of Hamilton Heights, an area traditionally home to a substantial black professional class. The brownstone revival of the 1960s and 1970s led to a new movement of middle-class blacks in the area. Hispanics arrived in large numbers in the 1980s, with Dominicans making up the majority. Today the local population is changing again, with Hispanics constituting a majority of the population followed by African Americans, West Indians, and Whites. Gentrification since 2005 has dramatically increased the proportion of non-Hispanic whites. Many actors, artists, teachers, and other professionals now reside in Hamilton Heights.

After the Russian Revolution, especially after the 1940s, many Ukrainians, Russian White émigré, and Polish found their way to New York City. Hamilton Heights had a very heavy population of Eastern European heritage, with a predominantly large number of Russians living in this immediate area. There were a couple of Russian Orthodox Churches erected, Russian book stores, bakeries, grocery and delicatessen stores, and theatres all along Broadway. The house on the corner of Broadway and W. 141st Street was known as the "Russian House" (Русский Дом), and a Russian library was on the other corner. During the late 1950s and throughout the 1960s, a lot of these Russians began to move out to suburban areas of New York and New Jersey. The only remaining landmark of this era is the Holy Fathers Russian Orthodox Church Russian Orthodox Church Outside Russia, located on 524 W. 153rd Street, with some notable Russian Americans buried at the bordering Trinity Cemetery.

== Notable sites ==
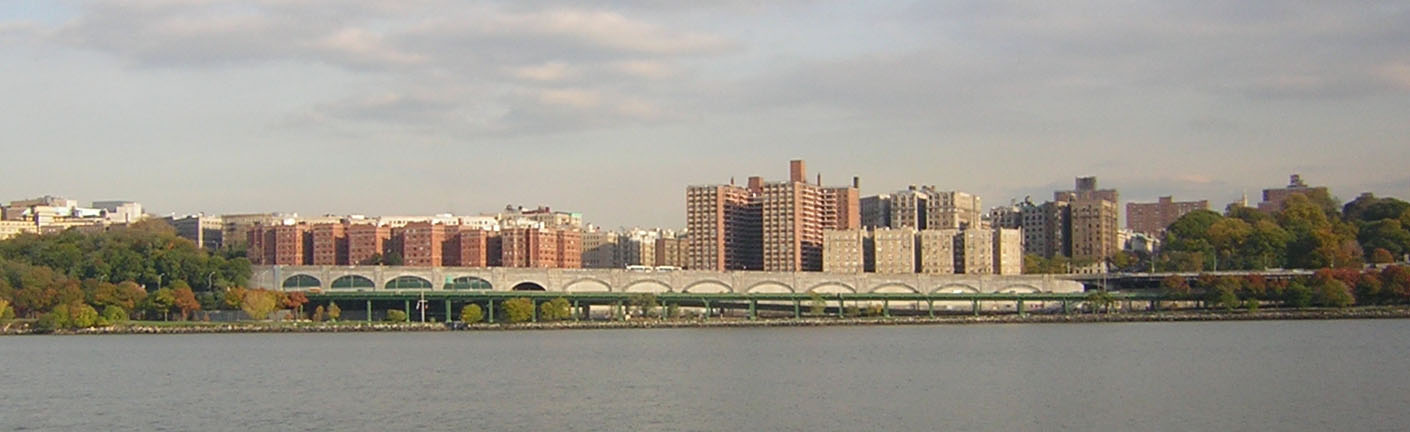
Hamilton Heights, as seen from the Hudson River

Hamilton Heights is the home of City College of New York (CCNY), Dance Theatre of Harlem, The Harlem School of the Arts, and Aaron Davis Hall.

Image of the Benziger House at night, Spring 2026

Nearly all of Hamilton Heights is on a district listed on the National Register of Historic Places. Historic Hamilton Heights comprises the Hamilton Heights Historic District and the Hamilton Heights/Sugar Hill Historic District Extension, both designated by the New York City Landmarks Preservation Commission and listed on the NRHP. The West Harlem Historic District, comprising the area west of Broadway from 135th to 153rd Streets, is also on the NRHP. Prominent historic buildings in the neighborhood include the Nicholas C. And Agnes Benziger House at the corner of Edgecomb Avenue and 150th St.

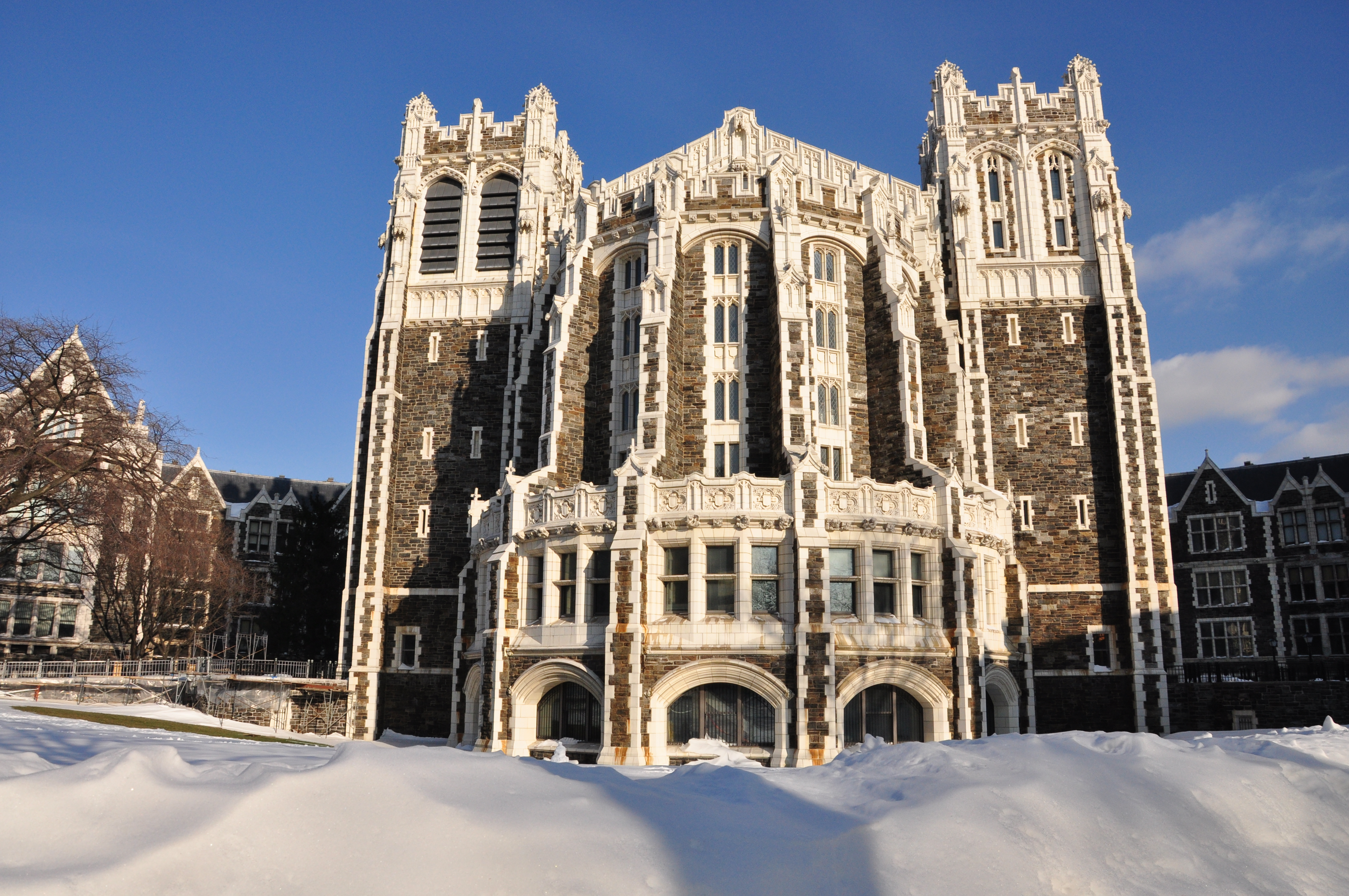
Shepard Hall, on the City College of New York's North Campus

One of the highest hills in Hamilton Heights slopes up from the Hudson River at 155th Street, and contains the Trinity Cemetery. Many individual buildings in the district are also landmarked, including the North Campus of CCNY, the building that once housed the High School of Music & Art, and the former 32nd Police Precinct Station.

The Audubon Mural Project paints the neighborhood with images of the birds depicted by John James Audubon in his early 19th century folio The Birds of America.

=== Parks ===
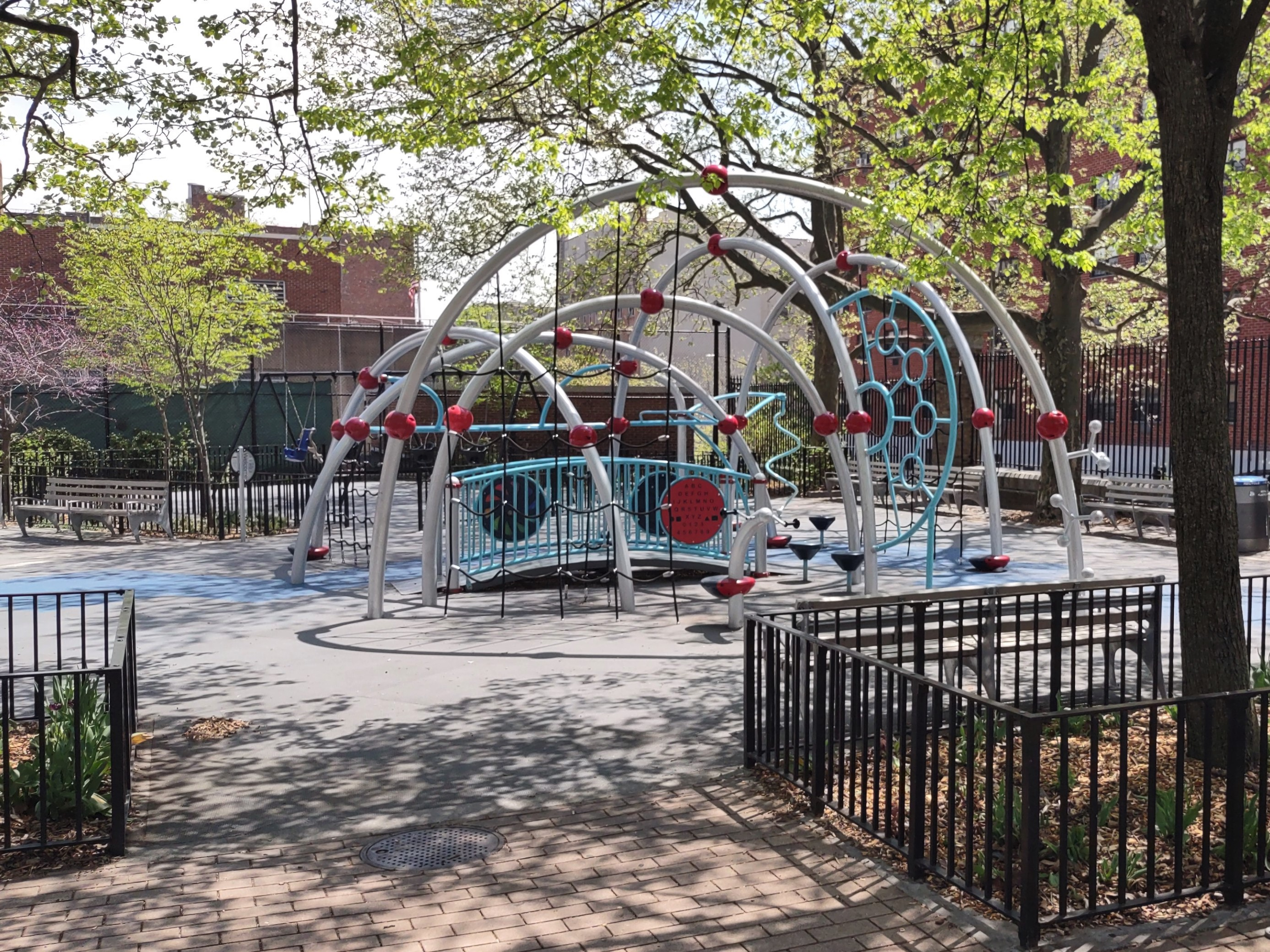
Carmansville Playground

The neighborhood offers several parks, including the Riverbank State Park, embedded in Riverside Park, which runs along the Hudson River west of Hamilton Heights. Other parks in the neighborhood include Jackie Robinson Park, St. Nicholas Park, and smaller sites such as Johnny Hartman Square, Carmansville Playground, and William A. Harris Garden.

== Police and crime ==
Hamilton Heights is served mostly by the 30th Precinct of the NYPD, located at 451 West 151st Street, although the City College area south of 141st Street and east of Amsterdam Avenue is actually served by the 26th Precinct. The 30th Precinct has a lower crime rate than in the 1990s, with crimes across all categories having decreased by 78.0% between 1990 and 2019. The precinct reported 4 murders, 20 rapes, 190 robberies, 178 felony assaults, 69 burglaries, 289 grand larcenies, and 27 grand larcenies auto in 2019. Of the five major violent felonies (murder, rape, felony assault, robbery, and burglary), the 30th Precinct had a rate of 760 crimes per 100,000 residents in 2019, compared to the boroughwide average of 632 crimes per 100,000 and the citywide average of 572 crimes per 100,000.

As of 2018, Manhattan Community District 9 has a non-fatal assault hospitalization rate of 57 per 100,000 people, compared to the boroughwide rate of 49 per 100,000 and the citywide rate of 59 per 100,000. Its incarceration rate is 633 per 100,000 people, compared to the boroughwide rate of 407 per 100,000 and the citywide rate of 425 per 100,000.

In 2019, the highest concentrations of felony assaults in Hamilton Heights were near the intersection of 135th Street and Broadway, where there were 10 felony assaults, and near the intersection of 145th Street and Amsterdam Avenue, where there were 11. The highest concentrations of robberies were nearby, around the intersection of 137th Street and Broadway, where there were 11 robberies, and around the intersection of 145th Street and Broadway, where there were 14.

== Fire safety ==
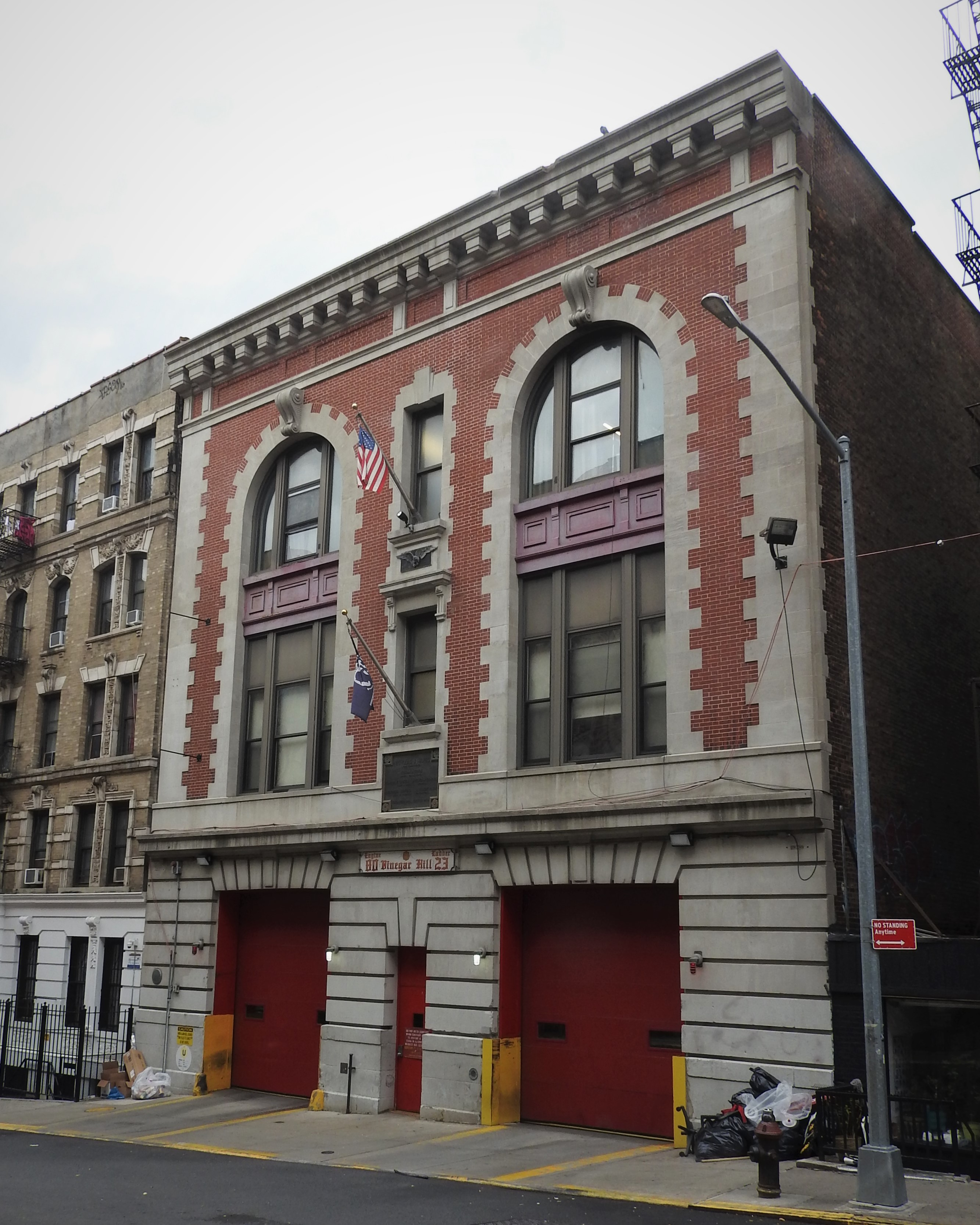
FDNY Engine 80 Ladder 23

Hamilton Heights is served by the New York City Fire Department (FDNY)'s Engine Company 80/Ladder Company 23, located at 503 West 139th Street.

== Health ==
Preterm and teenage births in Community District 9 are lower than the city average. In Community District 9, there were 82 preterm births per 1,000 live births (compared to 87 per 1,000 citywide), and 10.9 births to teenage mothers per 1,000 live births (compared to 19.3 per 1,000 citywide). Community District 9 has a low population of residents who are uninsured. In 2018, this population was estimated to be 11%, slightly less than the citywide rate of 12%.

The concentration of fine particulate matter, the deadliest type of air pollutant, in Community District 9 is 0.008 milligrams per cubic metre (8.0×10^{−9} oz/ft^{3}), more than the city average. Seventeen percent of Community District 9 residents are smokers, which is more than the city average of 14% of residents being smokers. In Community District 9, 21% of residents are obese, 10% are diabetic, and 29% have high blood pressure—compared to the citywide averages of 24%, 11%, and 28% respectively. In addition, 25% of children are obese, compared to the citywide average of 20%.

Eighty-eight percent of residents eat some fruits and vegetables every day, which is about the same as the city's average of 87%. In 2018, 83% of residents described their health as "good", "very good", or "excellent", more than the city's average of 78%. For every supermarket in Community District 9, there are 11 bodegas.

The nearest hospital is the Harlem Hospital Center, located in Central Harlem.

== Politics ==
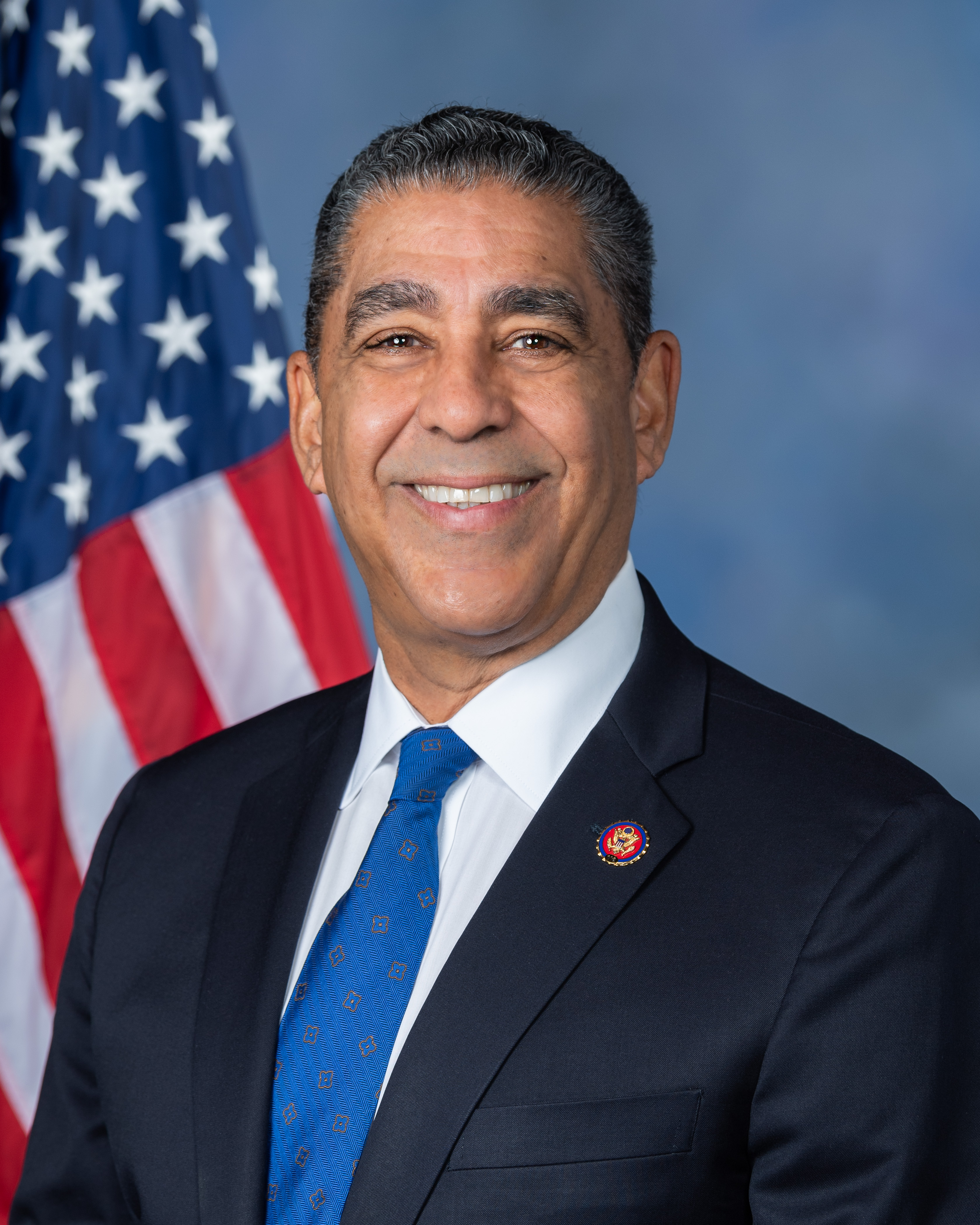
Adriano Espaillat

Politically, Hamilton Heights is in New York's 13th congressional district for the U.S. House of Representatives, represented by Democrat Adriano Espaillat since 2017. On the state level, it is in the New York State Senate's 30th district, represented by Democrat Cordell Cleare, and the New York State Assembly's 71st and 72nd districts represented by Democrats Al Taylor and Manny De Los Santos, respectively. On the city level, it is in the New York City Council's 7th district, represented by Democrat Shaun Abreu.

== Post offices and ZIP Codes ==
Hamilton Heights is located in multiple ZIP Codes. Most of the neighborhood is in 10031; however, the area north of 153rd Street is in 10032, and the Polo Grounds Towers are in 10039. The United States Postal Service operates two post offices in or near Hamilton Heights:

- Hamilton Grange Station Post Office – 521 West 146th Street
- College Station Post Office - 217 West 140th Street
- Fort Washington Post Office – 556 West 158th Street

== Education ==
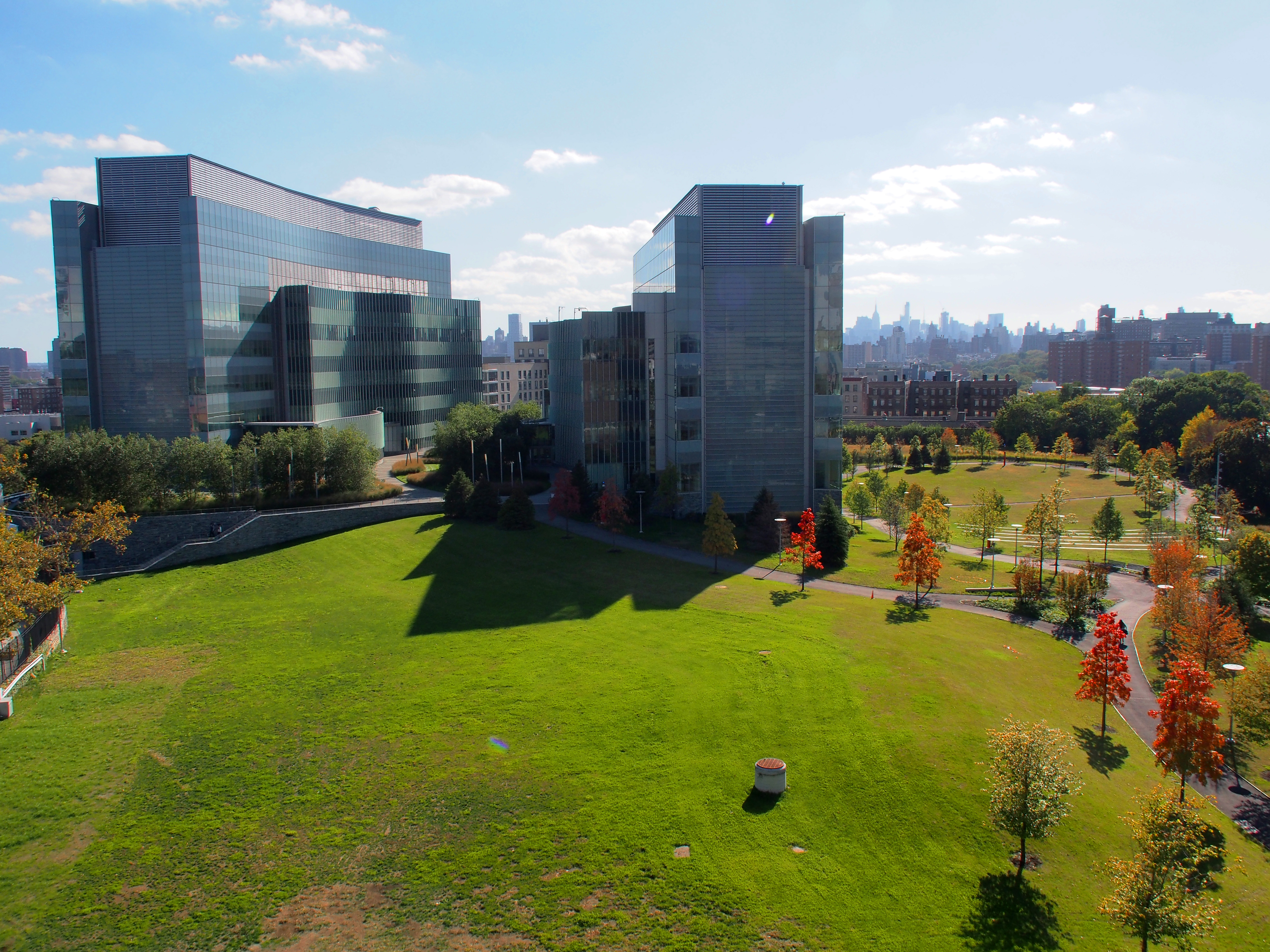
View of the City College campus lawn

Community District 9 had a higher rate of college-educated residents than the rest of the city as of 2018. A plurality of residents age 25 and older (49%) had a college education or higher, while 21% had less than a high school education and 30% were high school graduates or had some college education. By contrast, 64% of Manhattan residents and 43% of city residents have a college education or higher. The percentage of students in Community District 9 excelling in math rose from 25% in 2000 to 49% in 2011, and reading achievement increased from 32% to 35% during the same time period.

Community District 9's rate of elementary school student absenteeism is higher than the rest of New York City. In the 2016–17 school year, 27% of elementary school students missed 20 or more days per school year, more than the citywide average of 20%. Additionally, 65% of high school students in Community District 9 graduate on time, less than the citywide average of 75%.

=== Schools ===
The New York City Department of Education operates the following public elementary and middle schools in Hamilton Heights as part of Community School District 5:

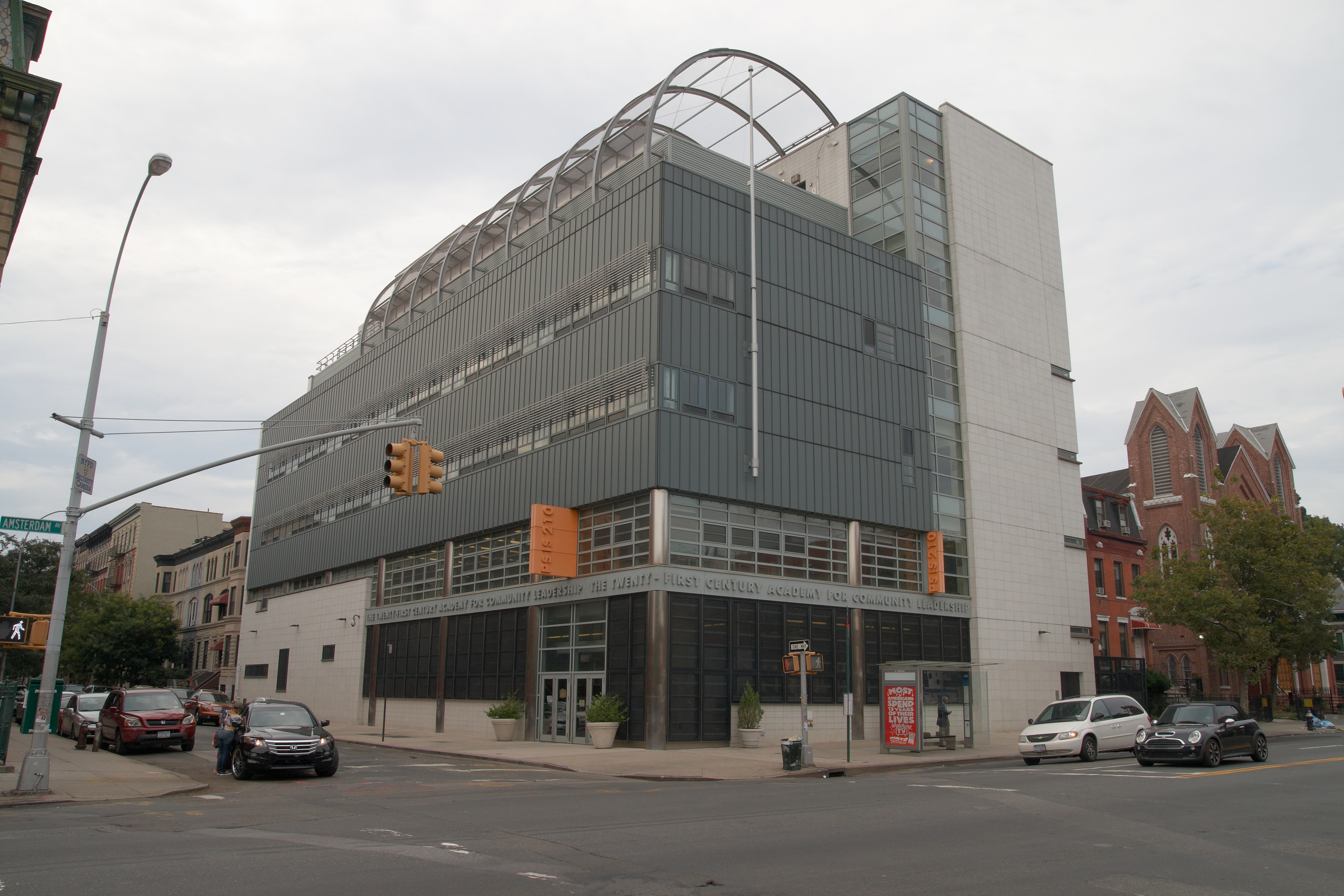
PS/IS 210

- Hamilton Heights School (grades K–5)
- New Design Middle School (grades 6–8)
- PS 153 Adam Clayton Powell (grades PK–5)
- PS 192 Jacob H Schiff (grades PK–5)
- PS/IS 210 21st Century Academy For Community Leaders (grades PK–8)

The following public high schools are also located in Hamilton Heights, serving grades 9–12:

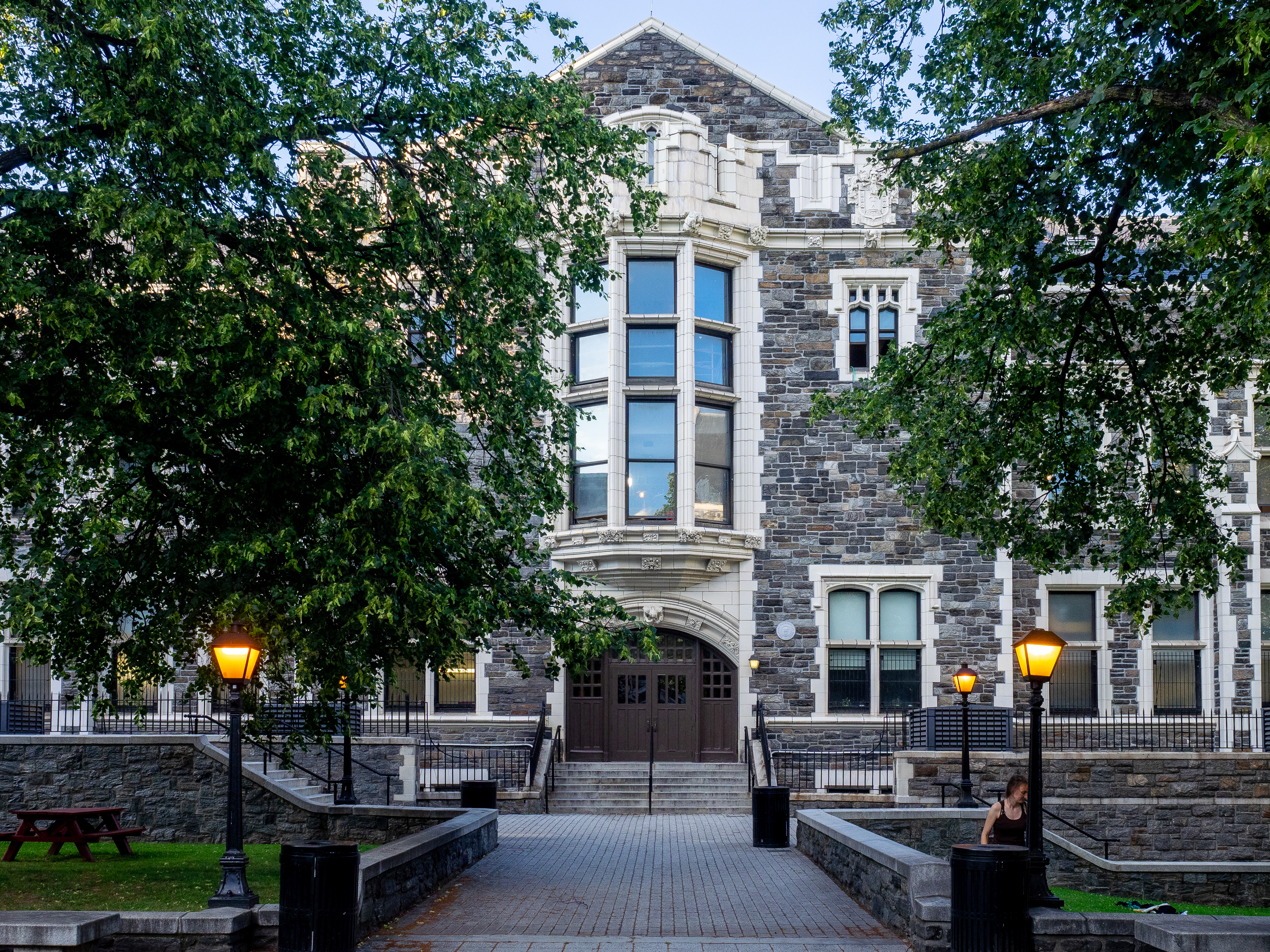
High School for Math, Science and Engineering at City College

- A. Philip Randolph Campus High School
- High School for Math, Science and Engineering at City College – a specialized high school

=== Higher education ===
The City College of New York, of the City University of New York system, is located in Hamilton Heights.

=== Library ===
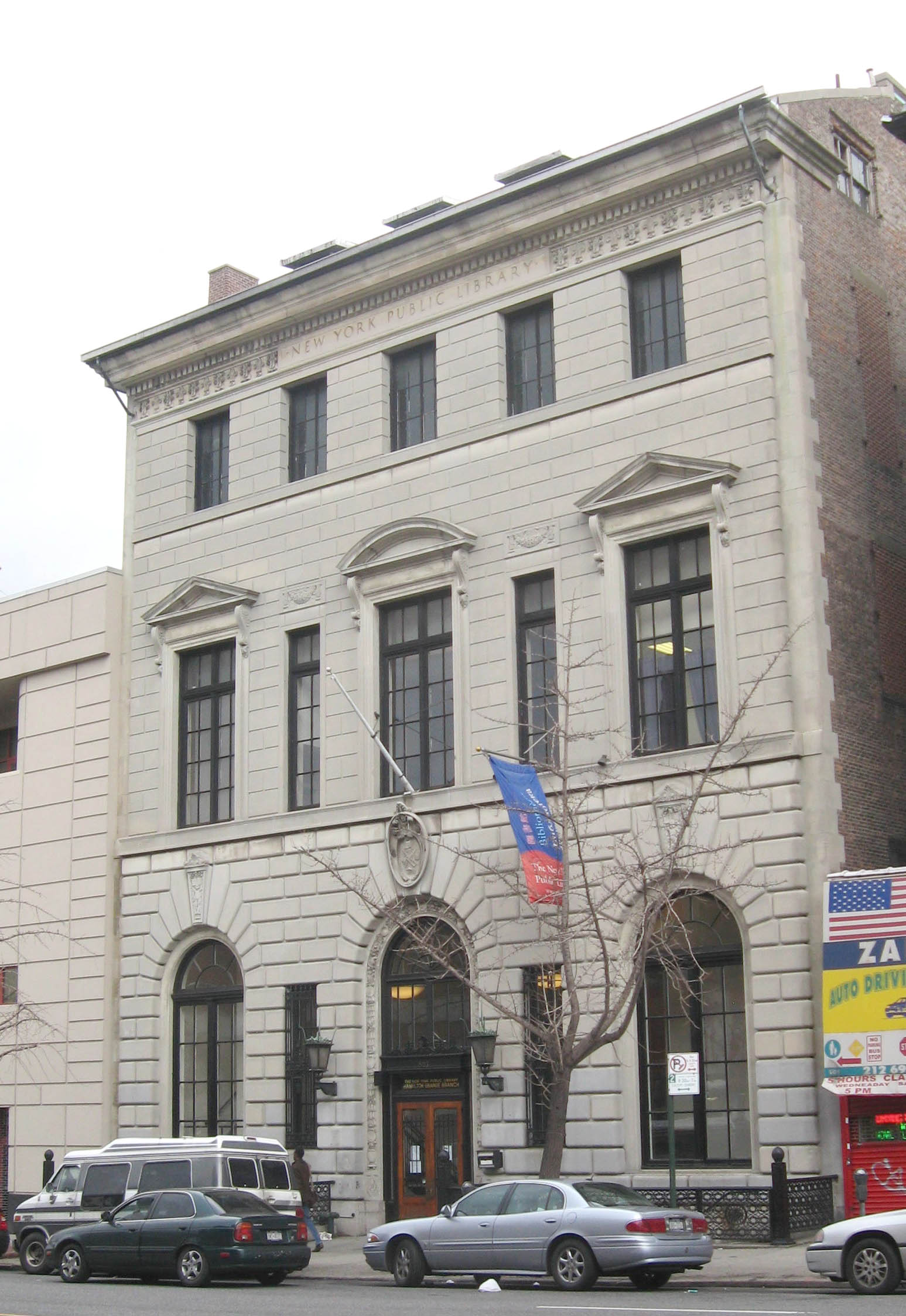
NYPL Hamilton Grange Branch

The New York Public Library (NYPL) operates the Hamilton Grange branch at 503 West 145th Street. It is named after "founding father" Alexander Hamilton, who lived at Hamilton Grange. The branch, a Carnegie library, opened in 1907 and was renovated in 1975; it is listed on the National Register of Historic Places.

== Transportation ==
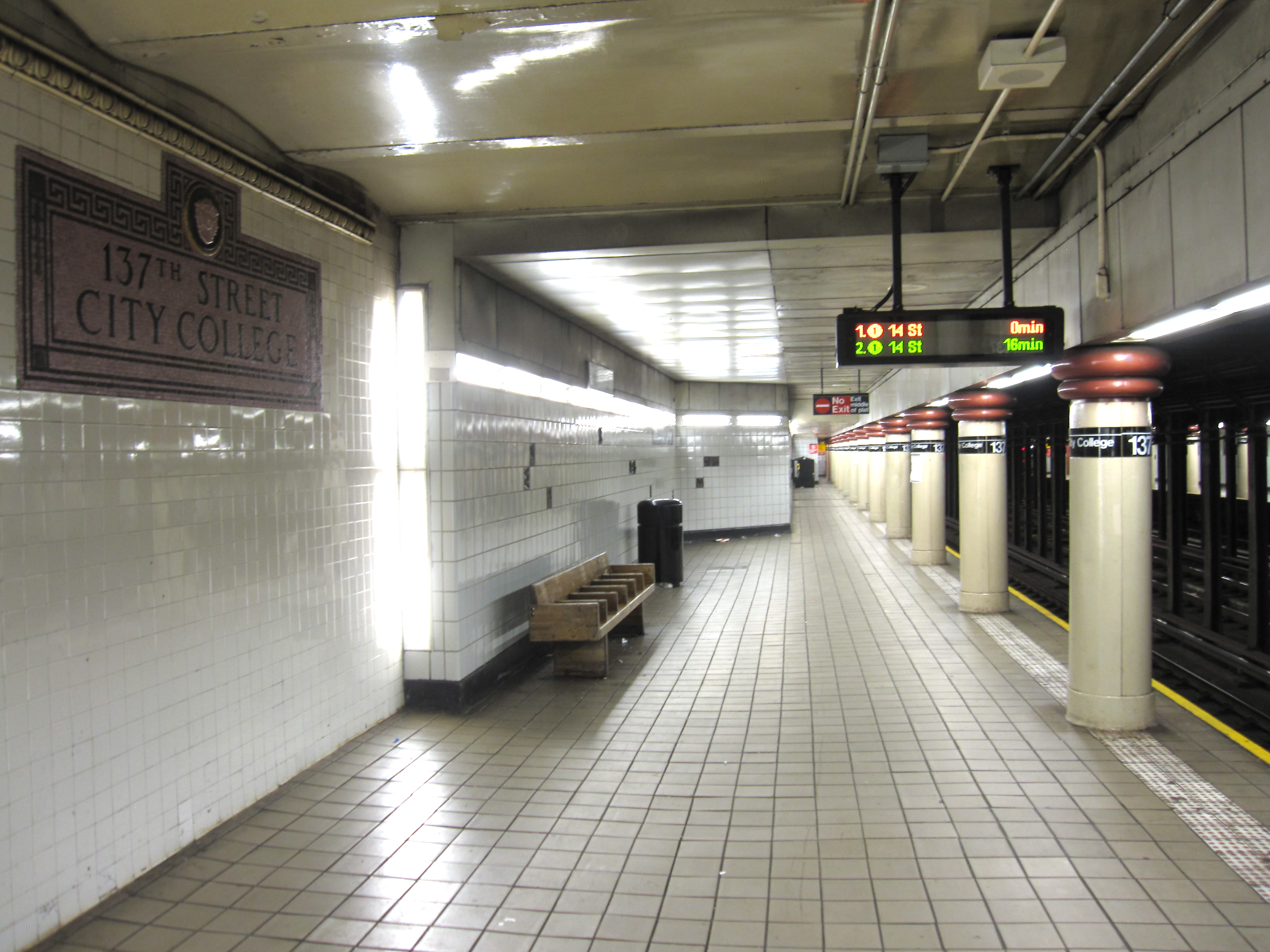
The 137th Street–City College station

The New York City Subway's IRT Broadway–Seventh Avenue Line stops in Hamilton Heights at the 137th Street–City College and 145th Street stations (1 train). The IND Eighth Avenue Line runs under St. Nicholas Avenue, providing service at 135th Street (A, B, and C trains), 145th Street (A, B, C, and D trains) and 155th Street (A and C trains). The IND Concourse Line branches off north of the 145th Street station, and runs under Saint Nicholas Place to serve 155th Street (B and D trains).

The MTA Regional Bus Operations' M3, M4, M5, M10, M11, M100, M101, Bx6, Bx6 SBS, Bx19 and Bx33 buses serve the area.

== Notable people ==
- Count Basie (1904–1984), jazz pianist, organist, bandleader, and composer
- Harry Belafonte (1927–2023), singer
- Diahann Carroll (1935–2019), singer, actress
- Duke Ellington (1899–1974), jazz pianist, composer, and jazz orchestra leader
- Ralph Ellison (1913–1994), author
- Álvaro Enrigue (born 1969), writer
- ASAP Ferg (born 1988), rapper
- George Gershwin (born Jacob Gershwine;1898–1937), composer; awarded the Congressional Gold Medal, and a special Pulitzer Prize.
- Alexander Hamilton (1755–1804), military officer, statesman, and Founding Father who served as the first U.S. Secretary of the Treasury
- Oscar Hammerstein I (1846–1919), composer, inventor, and theatrical entrepreneur
- Lena Horne (1917–2010), singer, actress, dancer, and civil rights activist
- Valeria Luiselli (born 1983), author
- Thurgood Marshall (1908–1993), civil rights lawyer and associate justice of the U.S. Supreme Court, the Supreme Court's first African-American justice.
- Yoselyn Ortega, Dominican-born American nanny convicted of stabbing to death children Lucia and Leo Krim in 2012.
- Beverly Peer (1912–1997), jazz double-bassist.
- Norman Rockwell (1894–1978), painter and illustrator
- Juelz Santana (born 1982), musician
- Nicholas Teliatnikow (1909–1970), photojournalist, photographer
- Malcolm X (1925–1965), civil rights activist

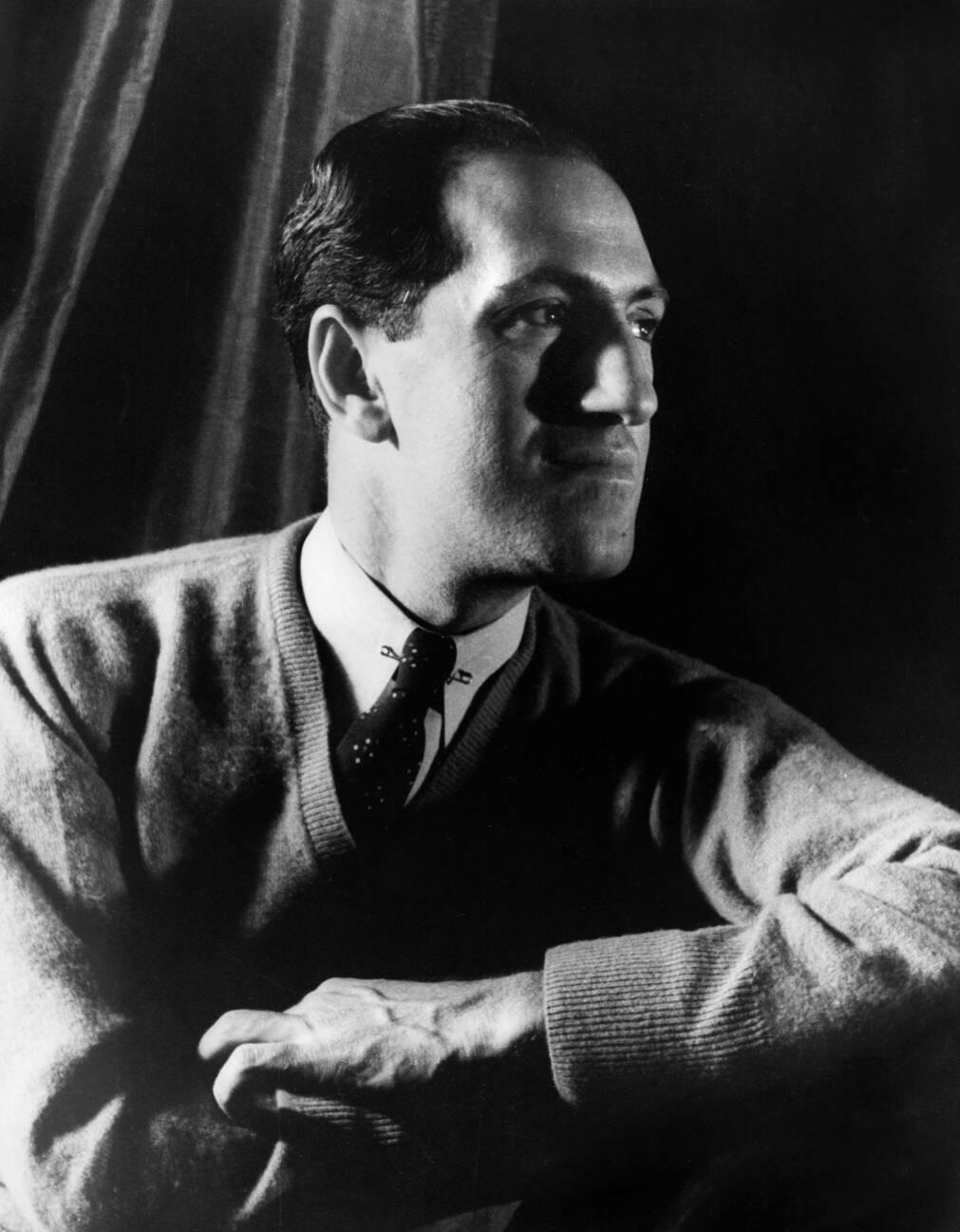
George Gershwin

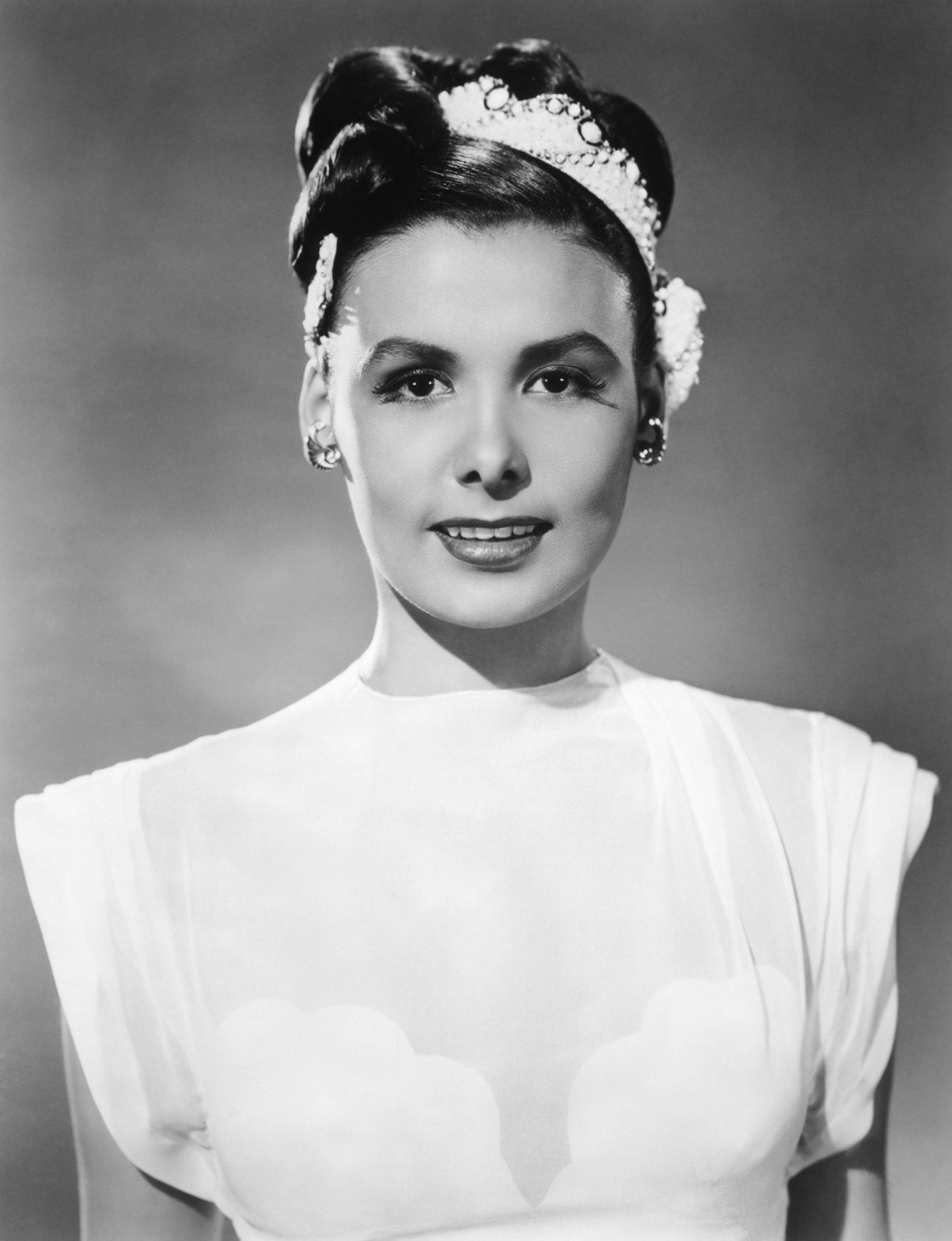
Lena Horne

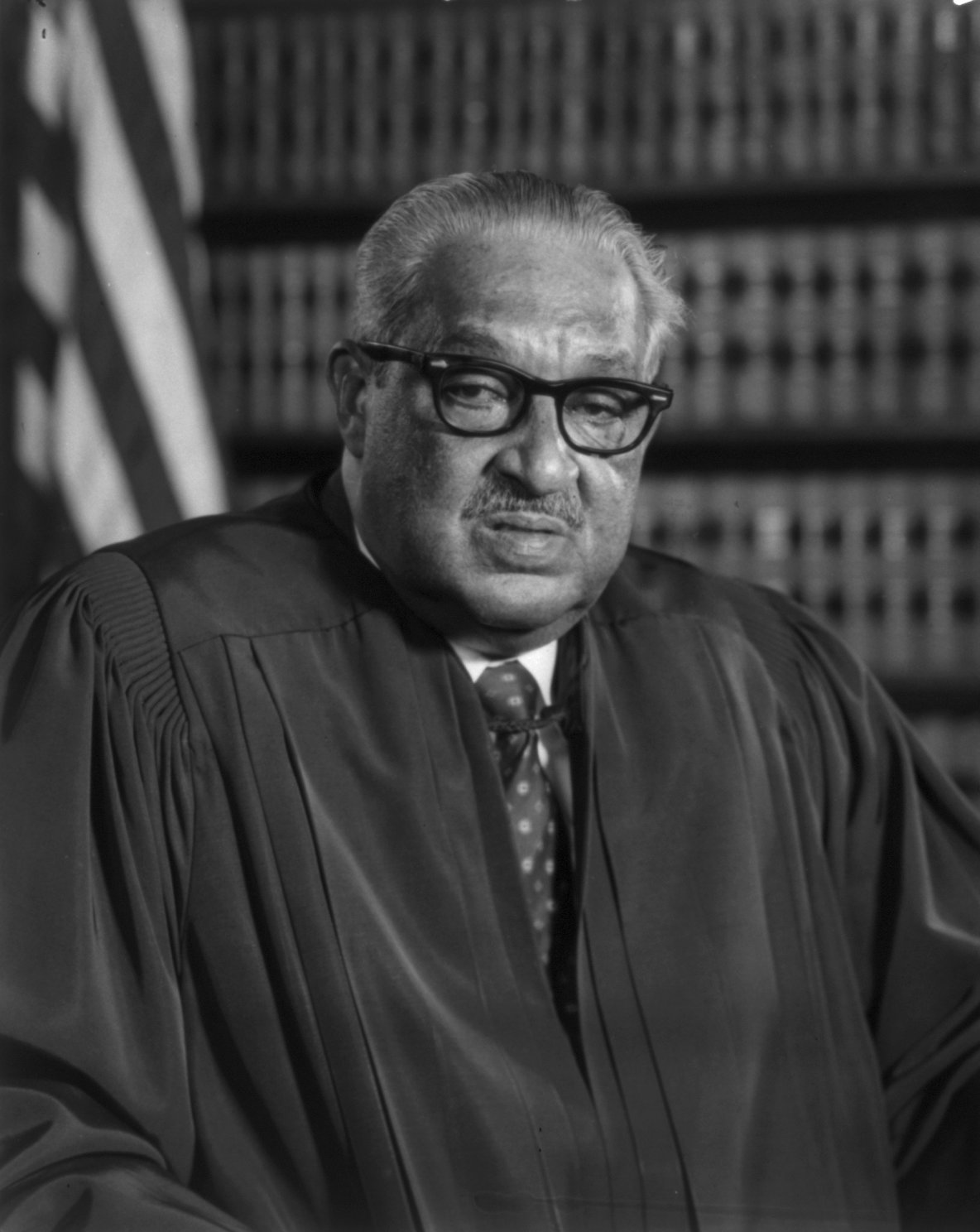
Thurgood Marshall

== See also ==
- Irish Americans in New York City
- Russian Americans in New York City
