= Our Lady of Lourdes Church (Manhattan) =

Church in Manhattan, New York

Church of Our Lady of Lourdes
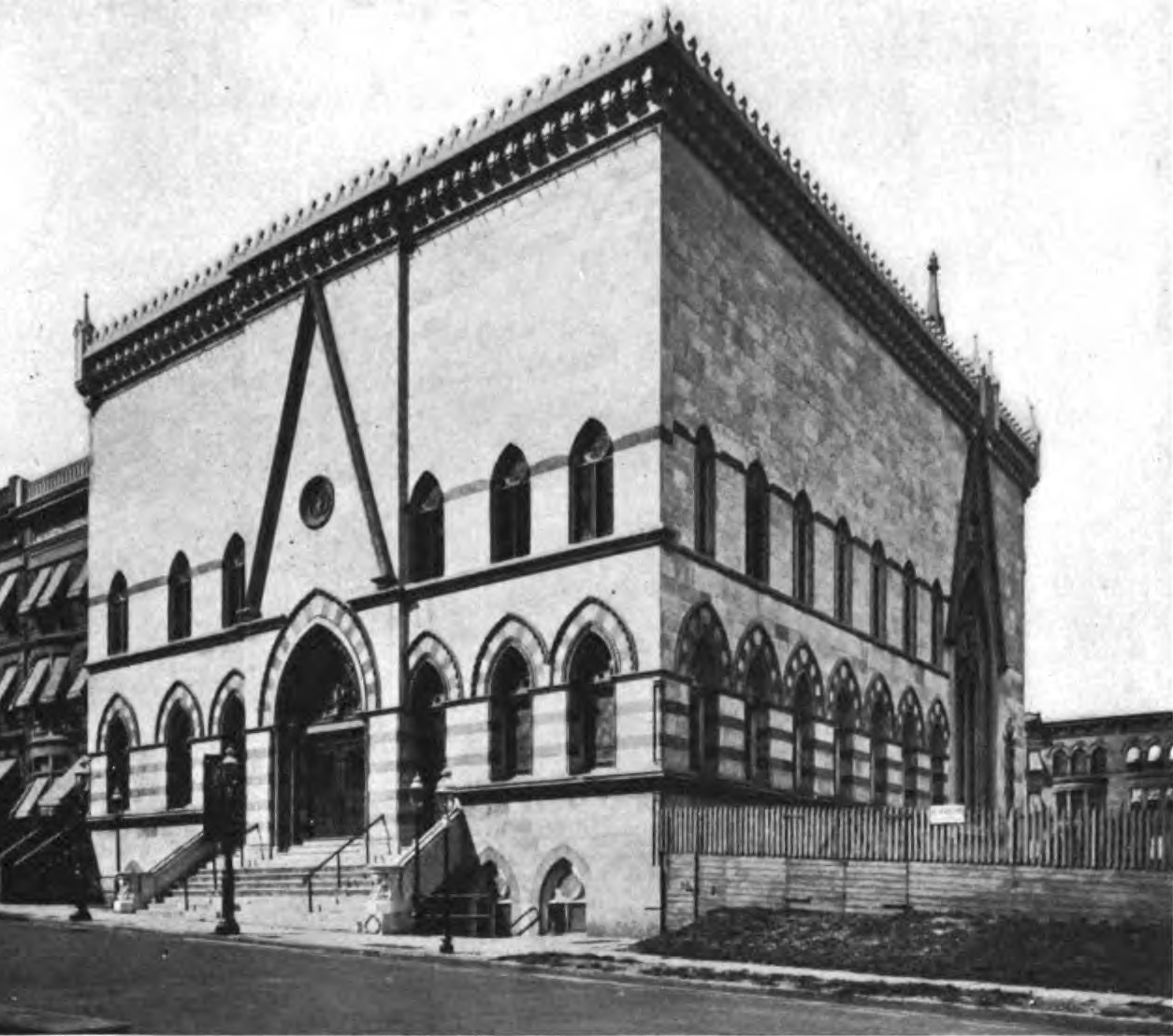
- An image of the church in 1914
- Church of Our Lady of Lourdes
- 40°49′24″N 73°56′54″W
- Location: 463 West 142nd Street; New York, New York 10031
- Country: United States
- Denomination: Roman Catholic Church
- Website: lourdesnyc.org

History
- Founded: 1901
- Founder: The Rev. Joseph H. McMahon
- Dedication: Our Lady of Lourdes

Architecture
- Architect(s): Peter B. Wight (facade), Cornelius O'Reilly
- Architectural type: church
- Style: Venetian Gothic & Gothic Revival
- Groundbreaking: 1902
- Completed: 1904
- Construction cost: $80,000

Administration
- Division: Vicariate of North Manhattan
- Archdiocese: New York

Clergy
- Pastor: Rev. Gilberto Angel-Neri

The Church of Our Lady of Lourdes is a parish church in Harlem, New York City, under the jurisdiction of the Archdiocese of New York, located at 463 West 142nd Street between Convent and Amsterdam Avenues.

== History ==
The parish was established in 1901 under the authority of Michael Corrigan, the Archbishop of New York, to serve the growing Catholic population of the Hamilton Heights neighborhood. Corrigan assigned the task to Fr Joseph H. McMahon, who had served as a curate at St. Patrick's Cathedral for the previous 15 years.

The parish established a school in 1903 which was staffed by the Ursulines. 10 years later, a larger school was constructed, which was also served by the Society of the Holy Child Jesus.

The church, which has been called "one of the oddest buildings in New York", was designated a New York City Landmark on July 22, 1975.

== Architecture ==
The church was built from 1902 to 1904 at 463 West 142nd Street between Convent and Amsterdam Avenues for $80,000 to the design of Cornelius O'Reilly of the O'Reilly Brothers firm. The building combined discarded elements of three recently demolished structures, which McMahon was able to obtain at a bargain:

- the facade on 142nd Street uses elements of the National Academy of Design building which stood at East 23rd Street and Fourth Avenue (now Park Avenue South), and was designed by Peter B. Wight in a style influenced by Venetian Gothic architecture; it was used in a way to reflect that of the original shrine for that devotion located in Lourdes, France.
- the church's apse and part of its eastern wall, including stained-glass windows, were elements removed from James Renwick Jr.'s St. Patrick's Cathedral to allow for the building of the Lady Chapel there; and
- the pedestals on either side of the entrance steps came from the mansion of department store magnate A. T. Stewart, called the "Marble Palace", which was designed by John Kellum, and which stood at 34th Street and Fifth Avenue until 1901.
- Bricks from the cathedral were used to construct the church

== Current status ==
Today the parish serves a congregation of African Americans, Dominicans, Ecuadorians, Eritreans and Mexicans, among others.

== See also ==
- List of New York City Landmarks
