= Hamilton Grange Library =

Library in Manhattan, New York

- New York Public Library, Hamilton Grange Branch
- U.S. National Register of Historic Places
- U.S. Historic district – Contributing property
- New York State Register of Historic Places
- New York City Landmark
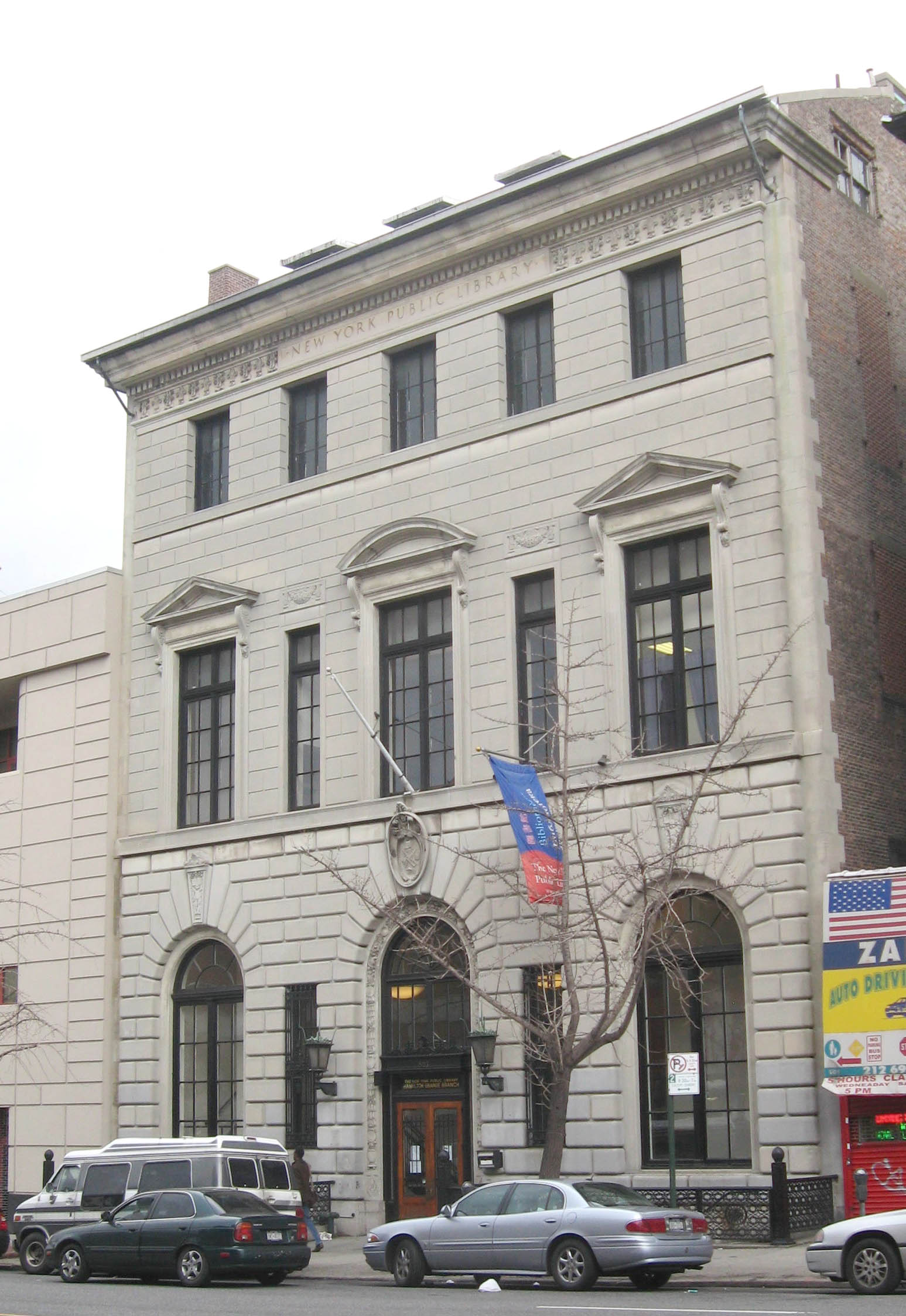
- New York Public Library, Hamilton Grange Branch, December 2008
- Location: 503 and 505 W. 145th St., New York, New York
- Coordinates: 40°49′32″N 73°56′54″W
- Area: less than one acre
- Built: 1905
- Architect: McKim, Mead & White
- Architectural style: Renaissance, Italian Renaissance
- Part of: West Harlem Historic District (ID100008341)
- NRHP reference No.: 81000410
- NYSRHP No.: 06101.001803
- NYCL No.: 0599

Significant dates
- Added to NRHP: July 23, 1981
- Designated NYSRHP: June 16, 1981
- Designated NYCL: March 31, 1970

The Hamilton Grange Branch of the New York Public Library is a historic library building located in Hamilton Heights, Manhattan, New York City. It was designed by McKim, Mead & White and built in 1905–1906. The branch was one of 65 built by the New York Public Library with funds provided by the philanthropist Andrew Carnegie, 11 of them designed by McKim, Mead & White. It is a three-story-high, five-bay-wide building faced in deeply rusticated gray limestone in an Italian Renaissance style. The building features round arched openings on the first floor and bronze lamps and grilles.

It was designated a New York City Landmark in 1970 and was listed on the National Register of Historic Places in 1981.

== See also ==
- List of New York City Designated Landmarks in Manhattan above 110th Street
- National Register of Historic Places listings in Manhattan above 110th Street
