= William A. Harris Garden =

Community garden in Manhattan, New York

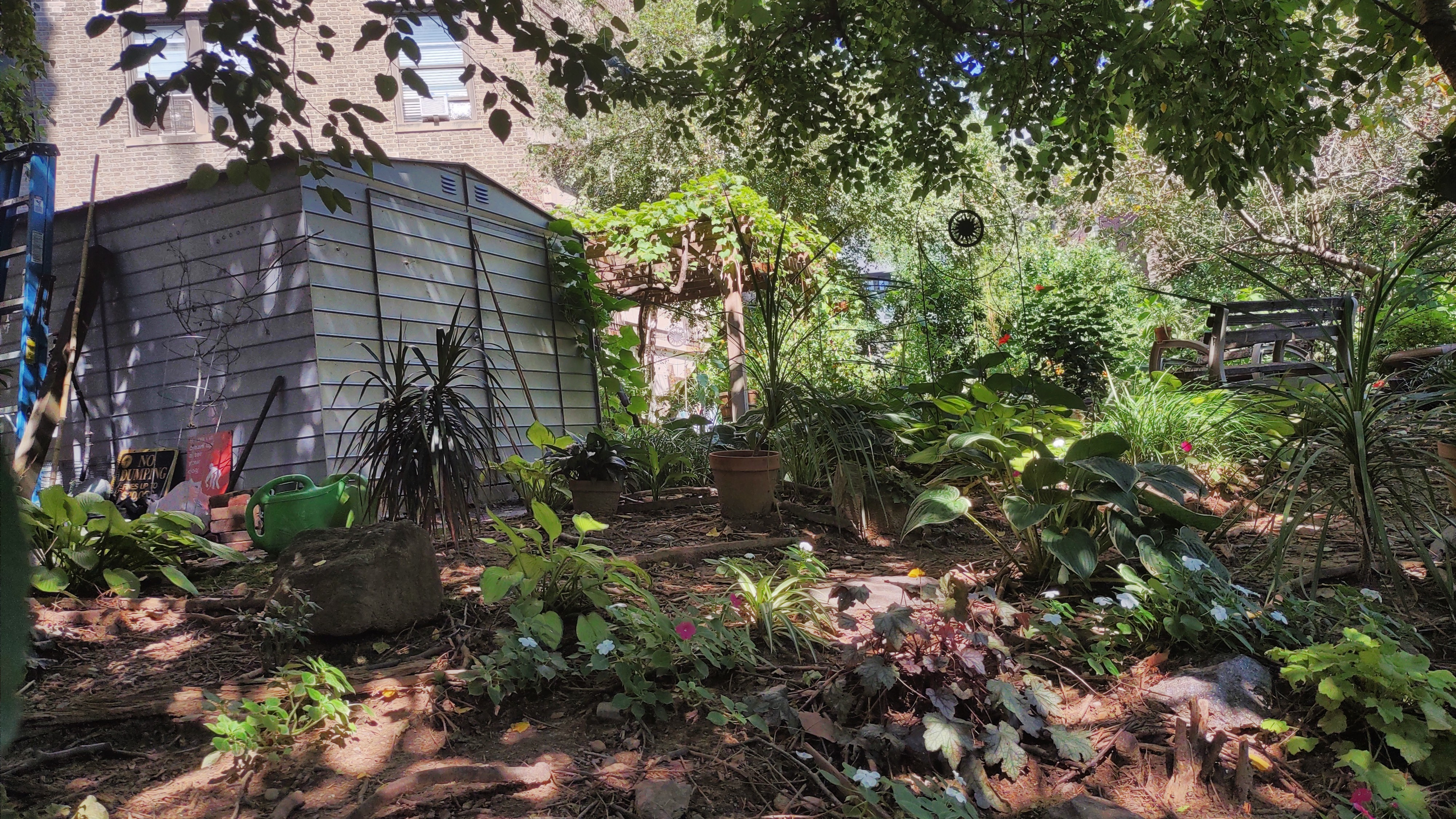
- William A. Harris Garden in 2021
- Interactive map of William A. Harris Garden
- Type: Community garden
- Location: Manhattan, New York city, United States
- Coordinates: 40°49′47″N 73°56′32″W

William A. Harris Garden is a 0.11-acre city-owned community garden in the Sugar Hill section of the Harlem neighborhood in New York City. It is located on the northwest corner of West 153rd Street and St. Nicholas Avenue.

For nearly a century after surrounding lots were developed, this property remained untouched because it sat atop the route of the Croton Aqueduct that has provided water to the city since 1838. The aqueduct brought water to Manhattan via the High Bridge, from there flowing through underground channels beneath St. Nicholas Avenue and Amsterdam Avenue on its way to the reservoirs of Central Park and Bryant Park.

In 1979, Sugar Hill resident William A. Harris (1921–2011) started a community garden in an empty lot at the corner of St. Nicholas Avenue and West 153rd Street.

A native of Bracey, Virginia, Harris relocated to New York after completing his army service during World War II. A 30-year veteran of the New York City Department of Sanitation, where he was a foreman. Harris encouraged local youths to volunteer in cleaning up the undeveloped lot.

The William A. Harris Garden is a focal point for a community. As the years passed, Harris planted more and more, and the small corner soon turned into a green patch, eventually blossoming into a thriving community garden overflowing with vegetables and flowers. Currently managed by his daughters, the garden has become a community treasure. Neighbors and community members of all ages chip in to help plant, water, and care for the plants. Although the garden sits atop the city’s water supply, the water used for maintaining the garden comes through natural means by a tank that stores nearly 1,000 gallons collected from the rooftop of the adjacent Kinghaven apartment building. The tank was installed in 2011 by members and volunteers of Green Apple Corps, under the supervision of GROWNYC.

== See also ==
- Community Gardens in New York City
- Community gardening in the United States
