= A. Philip Randolph Campus High School =

Public school in New York City

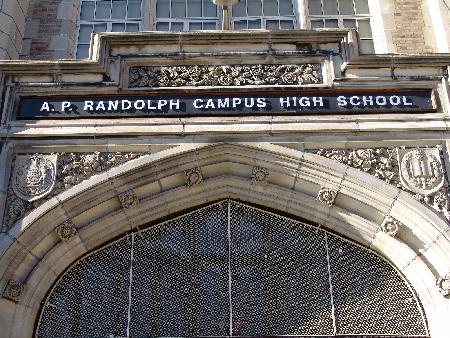

Location
- 443 W. 135th Street; New York, New York; United States; 40°49′06″N 73°57′01″W

Information
- Type: Public high school
- Established: 1979
- School district: 5
- Principal: David Fanning
- Faculty: 65.0 FTEs
- Grades: 9-12
- Enrollment: 1,367 (as of 2014-15)
- Student to teacher ratio: 21.0:1
- Website: aprandolph.enschool.org

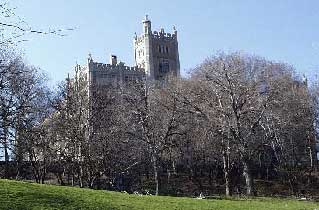
APRCHS Building Skyline

The A. Philip Randolph Campus High School is a four-year public high school in New York City. It is located in Harlem, adjacent to the City College of New York. It occupies a landmark building formerly occupied by The High School of Music & Art. The school was established in 1979 as an educational collaboration between the Board of Education and The City College of New York. The high school is open to all New York City residents, and more than 90% of its graduates attend college. Its daily attendance rate is 90 percent or better throughout the year. The students may take eleven Advanced Placement (AP) courses in five subject areas as well as college courses at Randolph, The City College, and Borough of Manhattan Community College. In doing so, many students earn college credits while attending high school.

As of the 2014–15 school year, the school had an enrollment of 1,367 students and 65.0 classroom teachers (on an FTE basis), for a student–teacher ratio of 21.0:1. There were 1,100 students (80.5% of enrollment) eligible for free lunch and 74 (5.4% of students) eligible for reduced-cost lunch.

== Asa Philip Randolph ==
Asa Philip Randolph founded the Brotherhood of Sleeping Car Porters and Pioneers in advancing racial equality within the labor movement. Randolph was involved in campaigns to improve wages and working conditions for black and white alike.

As a long-time advocate for civil rights, he pressured President Franklin D. Roosevelt to order an end to discrimination in war industries, in federal employment, and in the armed services. As a chairman of the 1963 March on Washington, Randolph fought for the oppressed races with a strict adherence to democratic principles.

Retiring as president of the Brotherhood of Sleeping Car Porters in 1968, Asa Philip Randolph was named the president of the recently formed A. Philip Randolph Institute, established to promote trade unionism in the black community. He continued to serve on the AFL-CIO Executive until 1974. On May 16, 1979, Randolph died in New York.

New York City high school 540, better known as A. Philip Randolph Campus High School, located on the City College of New York campus, is named in honor of Randolph.

== Programs ==
Randolph offers three screened programs: a medical program, humanities program, and an engineering program. Students applying for either of the screened programs are selected on the basis of:

1. Their 7th grade standardized citywide reading and math scores
2. Their grade point average (GPA)
3. Attendance and
4. Priority choice on their application.

The students in these three select programs take regents level and advanced courses in science and mathematics: anatomy, psychology, forensics, and AP Biology. The Engineering courses include Technical and architectural drawings, principles of engineering, engineering programming, and AP calculus. Research classes involve students in internships and national competitions.

=== College and Career Preparatory Institute program ===
The SBI College and Career Preparatory Institute (CCPI) enrolls students in their program which offers a curriculum of College and Career Preparatory workshops and sponsors Performing Arts groups. To be a part of any of CCPI's programs students must maintain a high level of participation and a GPA of 2.5 or better.

Sound Business, Inc. (SBI) is an independent, not-for-profit education services corporation that offers high potential, publicly educated New York City high school students an opportunity to prepare themselves for the pursuit of professional careers. Sound Business, Inc. works with educators, parents/guardians, community groups, and business leaders to develop and implement extra-curricular studies which complement rigorous academic programs. SBI extra-curricular studies address the attitudinal, socio-cultural, and informational needs of students who must be prepared to assume a broad range of societal leadership roles in the future.

== Partnerships ==
Hospital outreach: St. Luke's Hospital, Harlem Hospital, Gateway Medical
Higher education institutions: The City College of New York
Corporate: Sound Business Incorporated, Kaplan Educational Services, Magazine Publishers of America, Dominicans on Wall Street.

== Courses and program highlights ==
Language classes: Spanish
Advanced placement courses: Biology, Calculus AB, English Language and Composition, English Literature and YELLOW Composition, Macroeconomics, Physics B, Psychology, Spanish Language, Spanish Literature, AP Computer Science, United States History.

== Alumni ==
- David Branch (fighter), current professional Mixed Martial Artist for the UFC, former WSOF 2-division Champion
- Natasha Hastings (Track and Field), two-time Olympic Gold Medalist
