= Cervin Robinson =

American photographer and author (1928–2022)

- Born: May 18, 1928; Boston, Massachusetts, U.S.
- Died: December 27, 2022 (aged 94)
- Occupation: Photographer
- Years active: 1958–2022

Cervin Robinson (May 18, 1928 – December 27, 2022) was an American photographer and author best known for architectural photography and historical writings that span his career, active from 1957 to his death.

== Early life ==
Robinson was born in Boston, Massachusetts, the younger child of Frank Robinson and Mary Burchill Robinson.

Robinson received an A.B. in English Literature from Harvard University in 1950 and soon after was drafted into the U. S. Army where he gained an abiding interest in map projections and perspective. Impressed early in his life with physics and photography, he continued to photograph in earnest while stationed with the Army in Germany. Upon return to the U.S., he became the assistant for Walker Evans (1953–1957), and traveled through much of the American heartland.

Robinson died on December 27, 2022, at the age of 94.

== Career ==
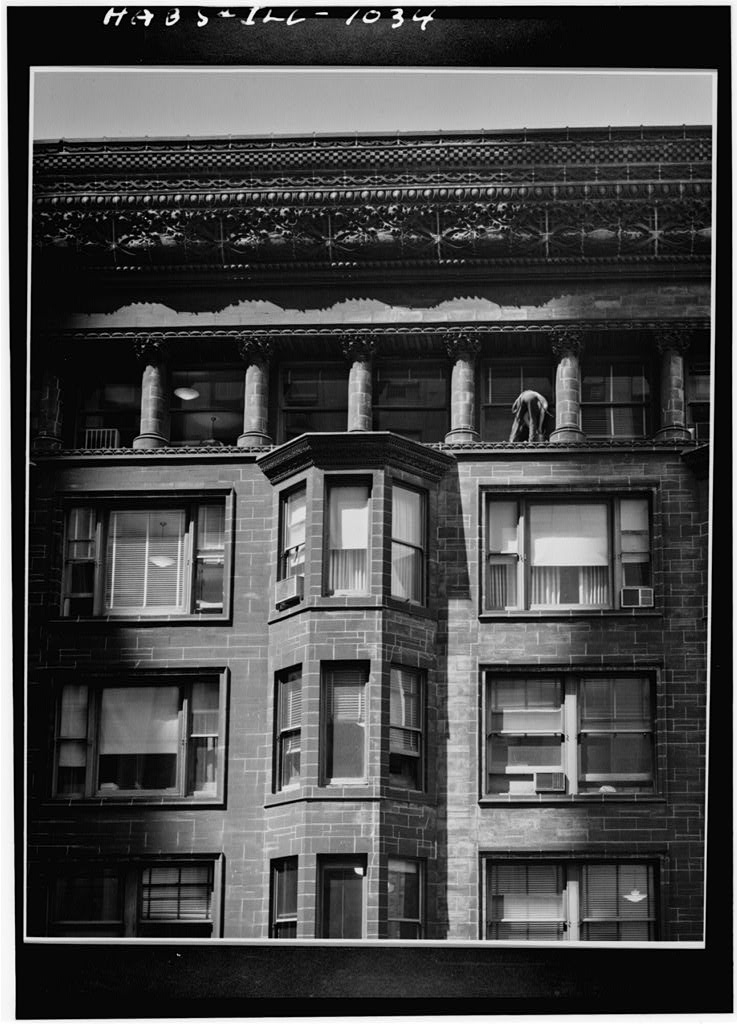
Detail of Chicago Stock Exchange, photo for HABS, 1963

In 1958, Robinson began contract work for the Historic American Buildings Survey (HABS) photographing in the northeast sector from Maine to Pennsylvania and into the Middle West. At the same time, he acted as American representative for the London-based Architectural Review for which he photographed major new American buildings. Thus his career in architectural photography was launched in New York with the 1958 commission to photograph the Seagram Building (Architects: Ludwig Mies van der Rohe, Philip Johnson).

Ever since then, Robinson has worked as a freelance photographer for architects and architectural magazines as well as Adjunct Professor of Architectural Photography in summer programs at Columbia University. More significantly, between the years 1987–2009, Robinson was an editor of photoessays for the journal, Places, and contributed many of his own works. He has also exhibited in galleries and major art museums.

== Approach to photography ==
Robert Campbell of the Boston Globe discussing the 2008 By Way of Broadway exhibit at MIT, wrote: 'Robinson loves to find and record places where something new is collaged over something old ... A huge red Checks Cashed Open 24 Hours billboard splashes across what once, clearly, was an elegant movie theater in the Art Deco style. An auto body shop, with a phony castle-like façade, shoves itself rudely in front of a decayed object that appears once to have been a grand memorial arch. As we perceive such scenes, we visually peel back the present to reveal the past. Robinson is, among other things, a photographer of time itself.'

== Grants and awards ==
Among several honors and acknowledgments, Cervin Robinson received a Guggenheim Fellowship, 1971 and two fellowship residencies at the MacDowell Colony, Peterborough, NH 1996 and 1998.

== Exhibitions ==
- Photographing Places: The Photographers of Places Journal, 1987–2009, MIT Museum, Kurtz Gallery for Photography, Cambridge, MA, January 22 – August 16, 2015
- Cervin Robinson, The Century Association, New York, NY, February 25 – March 22, 2013
- By Way of Broadway, Massachusetts Institute of Technology, Cambridge, MA, 2008, and subsequently shown by the Municipal Society Gallery, New York, NY, 2009.
- Cervin Robinson, Cleveland, Ohio, The Cleveland Museum of Art, Cleveland, OH, 1989
- Cervin Robinson, Photographs, 1958–1983, The Farish Gallery, School of Architecture, Rice University, Houston, TX, March–April 1983 and The Wellesley College Museum, Jewett Arts Center, Wellesley, MA, November 1983 – Jan 1984.
- Landmarks that Aren't, Municipal Art Society Gallery, New York, NY, 1982
- Skyscraper Style: Art Deco New York, Brooklyn Museum, Brooklyn, NY, 1975
- The Architecture of Frank Furness, Philadelphia Museum of Art, Philadelphia, PA,1973

== Works and publications ==
Chronological order by date of publication

- O'Gorman, James F.; Thomas, George E.; Myers, Hyman (1973). The Architecture of Frank Furness. Philadelphia: Philadelphia Museum of Art. OCLC 632577.
- Robinson, Cervin; Bletter, Rosemarie Haag (1975). Skyscraper Style: Art Deco, New York. New York: Oxford University Press. ISBN 978-0-19-501873-8. OCLC 1266717.
- Robinson, Cervin; Sobieszek, Robert A.; O'Gorman, James F. (1983). Cervin Robinson: Photographs, 1958–1983: An Exhibition Held at the Farish Gallery, School of Architecture, Rice University, March-April 1983, the Wellesley College Museum, Jewett Arts Center, November 1983-January 1984, and Other Locations. Wellesley, MA: Wellesley College, Wellesley College Museum. pp. 5–7. OCLC 10121064.
- Robinson, Cervin; Herschman, Joel (1987). Architecture Transformed: A History of the Photography of Buildings from 1839 to the Present (2nd ed.). New York, N.Y.: Architectural League of New York. ISBN 978-0-262-18121-1. OCLC 14167892.
- Robinson, Cervin; Cleveland Museum of Art; Turner, Evan H. (1989). Cervin Robinson/Cleveland, Ohio: An Exhibition of 100 Photographs Commissioned by the Cleveland Museum of Art. Cleveland: Cleveland Museum of Art in cooperation with Indiana University Press. ISBN 978-0-910386-98-2. OCLC 20131057.
- O'Gorman, James F.; Richardson, H.H.; Robinson, Cervin (1997). Living Architecture: A Biography of H.H. Richardson. New York, NY: Simon & Schuster. ISBN 978-0-684-83618-8. OCLC 36900948.
- Case Western Reserve University; Pytte, Agnar; Lewis, John F.; Robinson, Cervin; Baznik, Richard E. (1999). Renaissance: Twelve Years of Progress, 1987–1999. Cleveland, Ohio: Case Western Reserve University. OCLC 42871890.
- Van Zanten, David; Robinson, Cervin (2000). Sullivan's City: The Meaning of Ornament for Louis Sullivan (1st ed.). New York: W.W. Norton. ISBN 978-0-393-73038-8. OCLC 43115061.
- Dean, Andrea Oppenheimer; Hursley, Timothy (2002). Rural Studio: Samuel Mockbee and an Architecture of Decency (1st ed.). New York: Princeton Architectural Press. ISBN 978-1-56898-292-2. OCLC 47208437.
- O'Gorman, James F.; Robinson, Cervin (2008). Henry Austin: In Every Variety of Architectural Style. Middletown, Conn.: Wesleyan University Press. pp. 5–7. ISBN 978-0-8195-6896-0. OCLC 767498499.
