= Dyckman Houses =

Public housing development in Manhattan, New York

- NYCHA Property
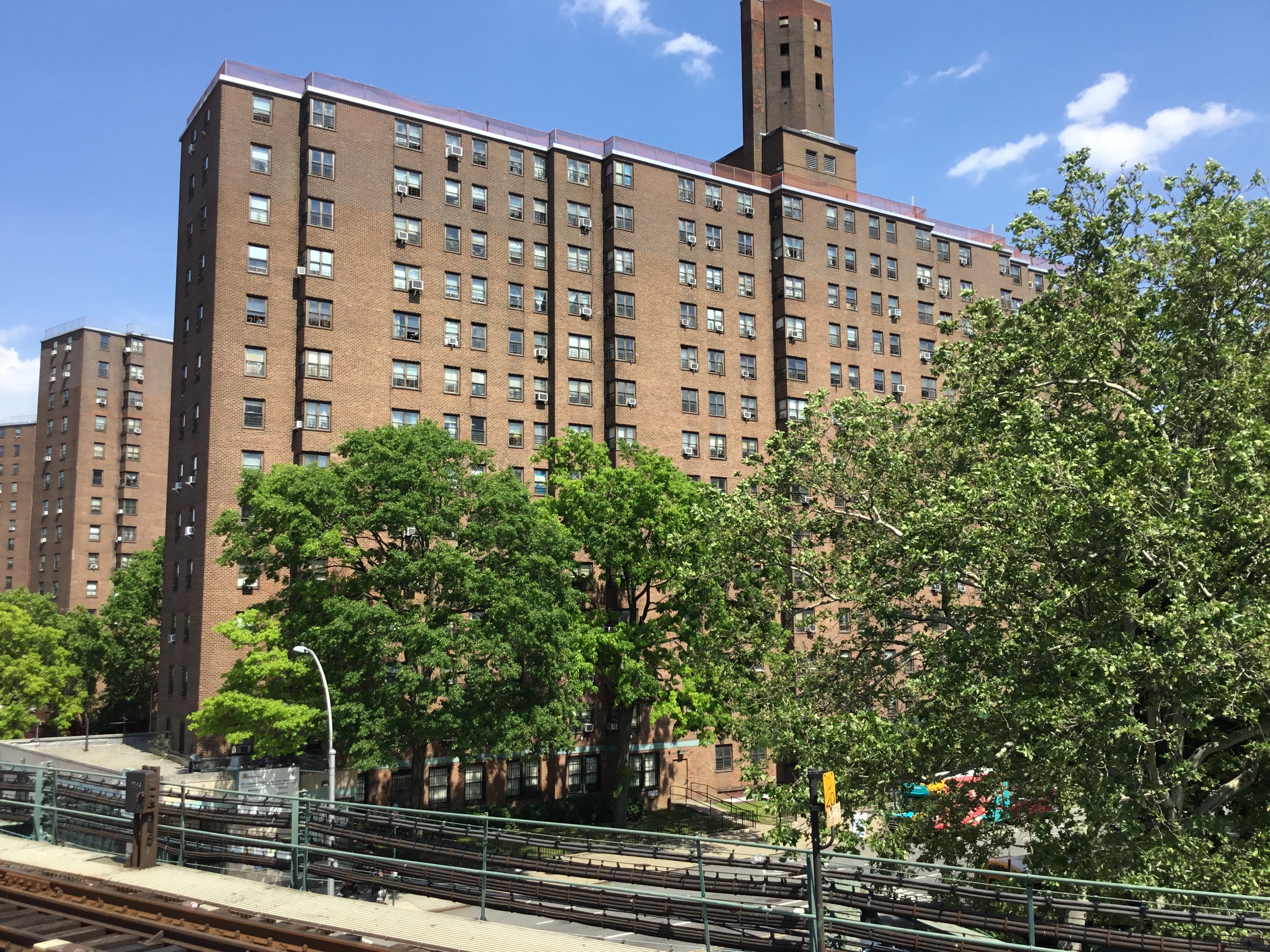
- Seen from the Dyckman Street station on the 1 Line
- Interactive map of Dyckman Houses
- Country: United States
- State: New York
- City: New York City
- Borough: Manhattan

Area
  - Total: 13.01 acres (5.26 ha)

Population
  - Total: 1,966
- Zip Code: 10034

The Dyckman Houses is a NYCHA housing project that has 7 buildings with 14 and 15 stories tall. It is located between 10th and Nagle Avenues and also north of Dyckman Street in Inwood, Manhattan. It is also located next to the IRT Broadway-Seventh Avenue Line elevated subway tracks.

== History ==
The eastern portion of the site was formerly occupied by the Dyckman Oval and the western portion of the site was formerly occupied by Sherman Creek. The project was approved by the Board of Estimate on May 27, 1948. The groundbreaking ceremony was held on March 1, 1949, and construction was completed in April 1951. The first tenants began moving into the complex in September 1950. It was designed by architect William F. Ballard.

=== 21st century ===
In 2001, the Dyckman Houses were the site of two murders involving residents Doris Drakeford and Jerry Pollard. Police went to Pollard's apartment after receiving a report from Fernando Castro, who said he had seen Bernard Perez inside the apartment with a headless body. Officers apprehended Perez in the apartment, where they found Pollard's partially dismembered remains. Contemporary reports said authorities believed Drakeford and Pollard had been targeted so their apartments could be taken over. Perez was subsequently convicted of first-degree murder in Drakeford's death and second-degree murder in Pollard's death, along with related robbery and burglary charges. In 2004, he was sentenced to life imprisonment without the possibility of parole for the first-degree murder conviction, with additional sentences imposed for the Pollard killing.

In March 2023, renovations to the two playgrounds within this complex (one is located between Buildings III and V and another is located between IV and VI) were completed as part of a $438,000 project.

== See also ==
- New York City Housing Authority
