= United States Post Office–Inwood Station =

Historic post office in Manhattan, New York

- United States Post Office; Inwood Station
- U.S. National Register of Historic Places
- New York State Register of Historic Places
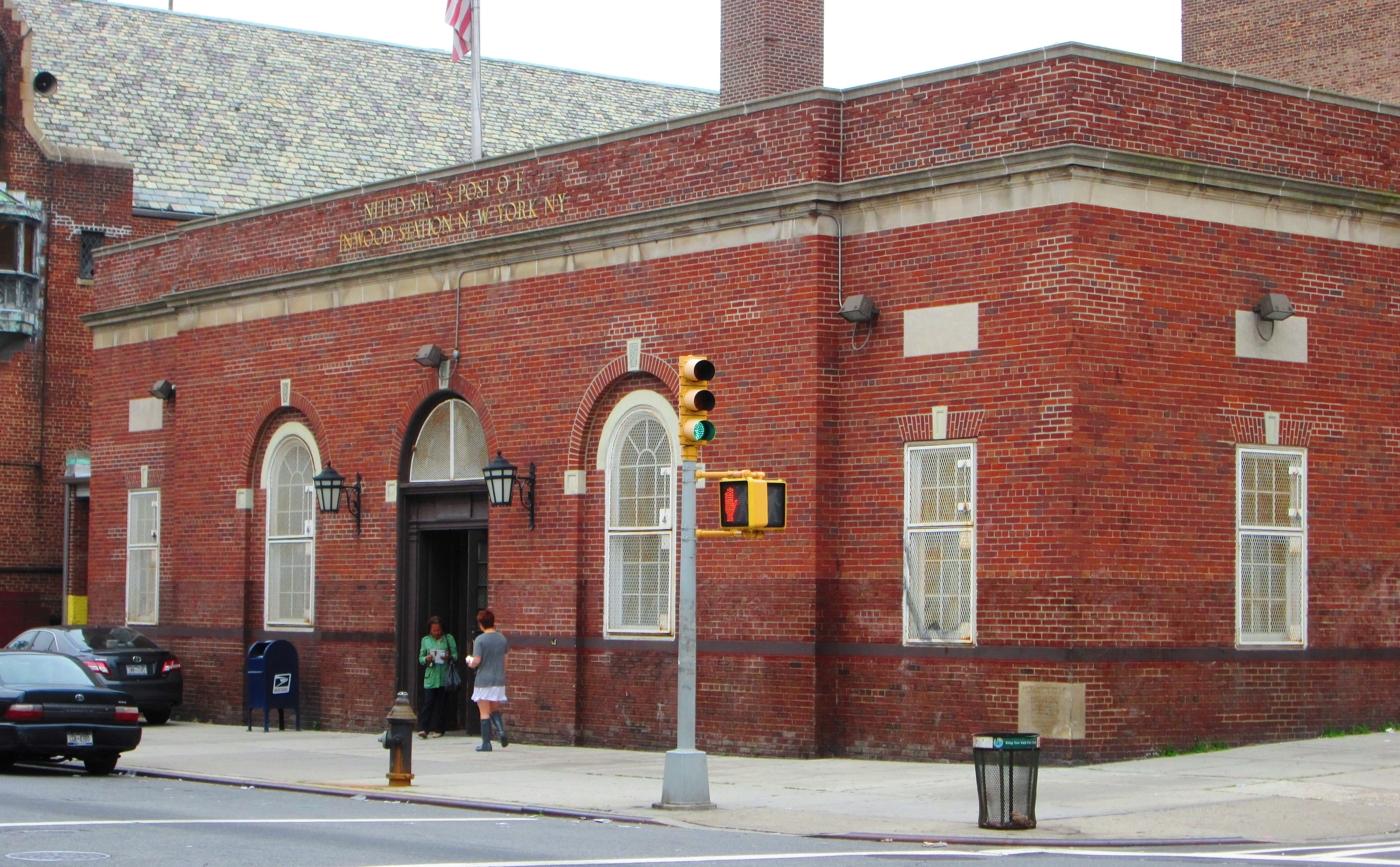
- (2014)

- Location within New York City Location within New York Location within the United States
- Location: 90 Vermilyea Avenue; Inwood, Manhattan, New York City
- Coordinates: 40°51′58″N 73°55′26″W
- Built: 1935-37
- Architect: Carroll H. Pratt
- Architectural style: Colonial Revival
- MPS: US Post Offices in New York State, 1858-1943, TR
- NRHP reference No.: 88002361
- NYSRHP No.: 06101.001782

Significant dates
- Added to NRHP: May 11, 1989
- Designated NYSRHP: June 11, 1989

The United States Post Office Inwood Station is a historic post office building located at 90 Vermilyea Avenue at the corner of West 204th Street in the Inwood neighborhood of Manhattan, New York City. It was built between 1935 and 1937, and designed by consulting architect Carroll H. Pratt (1874-1958) for the Office of the Supervising Architect of the United States Department of the Treasury. It is a one-story brick building in the Colonial Revival style, with a three-bay-wide projecting entrance pavilion. It features a limestone cornice and frieze topped by a brick parapet.

The building was listed on the National Register of Historic Places in 1989.
