= Manhattan Community Board 12 =

Manhattan Community District 12 Manhattan Community Board 12
- Community district
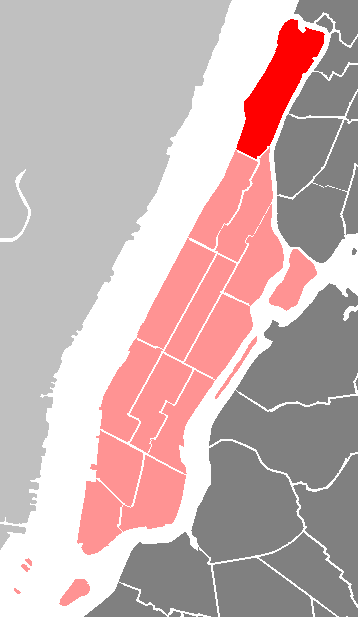
- Location in Upper Manhattan
- Country: United States
- State: New York
- City: New York City
- Borough: Manhattan
- Neighborhoods: list: Inwood; Washington Heights

Government
  - Type: Community board
  - Body: Manhattan Community Board 12
  - Chairperson: Anthony Viola
  - District Manager: Kiana Diaz

Area
  - Total: 2.8 sq mi (7.3 km^{2})

Population (2010)
  - Total: 190,020
  - Density: 68,000/sq mi (26,000/km^{2})

Ethnicity
  - Hispanic and Latino Americans: 68.8%
  - African-American: 7.6%
  - White: 18.9%
  - Asian: 3.0%
  - Others: 1.7%
- Time zone: UTC−5 (Eastern)
  - Summer (DST): UTC−4 (EDT)
- ZIP codes: 10032, 10033, 10034, and 10040
- Area codes: 212, 646, and 332, and 917
- Police Precincts: 33rd (website); 34th (website)
- Website: cbmanhattan.cityofnewyork.us/cb12/

The Manhattan Community Board 12 is a New York City community board for the neighborhoods of Inwood and Washington Heights in the borough of Manhattan. It is delimited by the Harlem River on the east and on the north, the Hudson River on the west and 155th Street on the south.

== Demographics ==
As of 2000, the Community Board had a population of 208,414, up from 198,192 in 1990, and 179,141 in 1980. Of the population (as of 2000), 28,242 (13.6%) are White non Hispanic, 17,480 (8.4%) are African-American, 4,310 (2.1%) Asian or Pacific Islander, 505 (0.2%) American Indian or Native Alaskan, 727 (0.3%) of some other race, 2,736 (1.3%) of two or more race, 154,414 (74.1%) of Hispanic origins. As of 2009, 42.3% of the population benefit from public assistance, which was up from 33.3% in 2000.

The land area is 1,790.6 acres, or 2.8 square miles (7.3 km^{2}).

== Notable members ==
- Adriano Espaillat
