= Park Terrace West-West 217th Street Historic District =

Historic district in Manhattan, New York

Coordinates: 40.871485°N 73.917161°W

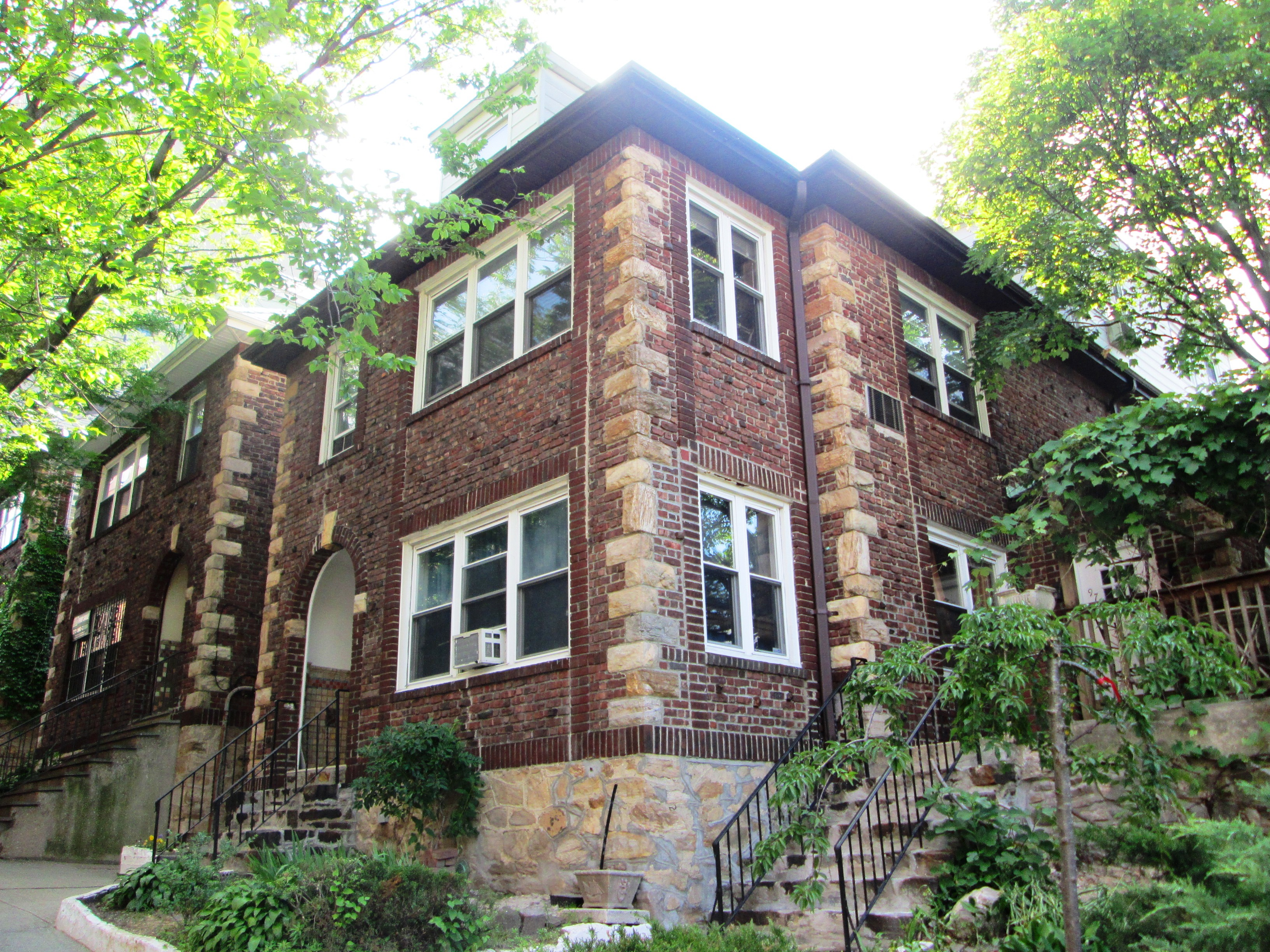
Two houses on Park Terrace West, part of the Park Terrace West-West 217th Street Historic District

The Park Terrace West-West 217th Street Historic District is a small historic district located in the Inwood neighborhood of Upper Manhattan, New York City. It was designated by the New York City Landmarks Preservation Commission on December 11, 2018. The district contains the only detached suburban housing on Manhattan Island.

== Description and history ==
The district consists of 15 free-standing or semi-detached two-story houses built between 1920 and 1935. They typically have garages and yards with gardens configured for the topography of the area, and have a suburban feel, the result of being built later than the remainder of Manhattan, on properties which had previously been farms or large estates. Even after the building of the IND Eighth Avenue Line spurred the building of large apartment buildings along Broadway in the Inwood area, the land in the historic district remained part of the large Drake-Seaman estate, which delayed its development.

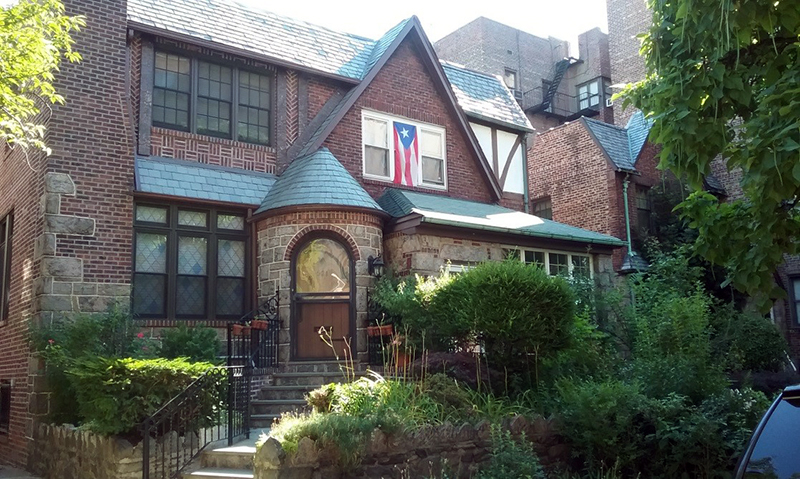
531 w 217th Street Park Terrace West – West 217th Street Historic District

The houses were designed by six architects or architecture firms – Moore & Landsiedel, Benjamin Driesler, Louis Kurtz, C. G. de Neergaard, and A. H. Zacharius – in the Tudor Revival or Colonial Revival styles, as influenced by the Arts & Crafts style of architecture. They were built during a period when features of revival styles were often combined with more modern styles of architecture which accommodated the automobile. The houses feature multi-colored bricks which are textured and patterned, stone accents arrange randomly, and entries decorated with tile, while some have Medieval-style half-timbering and plank doors, along with pebble dash stucco.

The creation of the historic district had been supported by Community Board 12 for at least 10 years, and was applauded by the local homeowner's association.
