= Inwood, Manhattan =

Neighborhood in New York City

Inwood
- Neighborhood of Manhattan
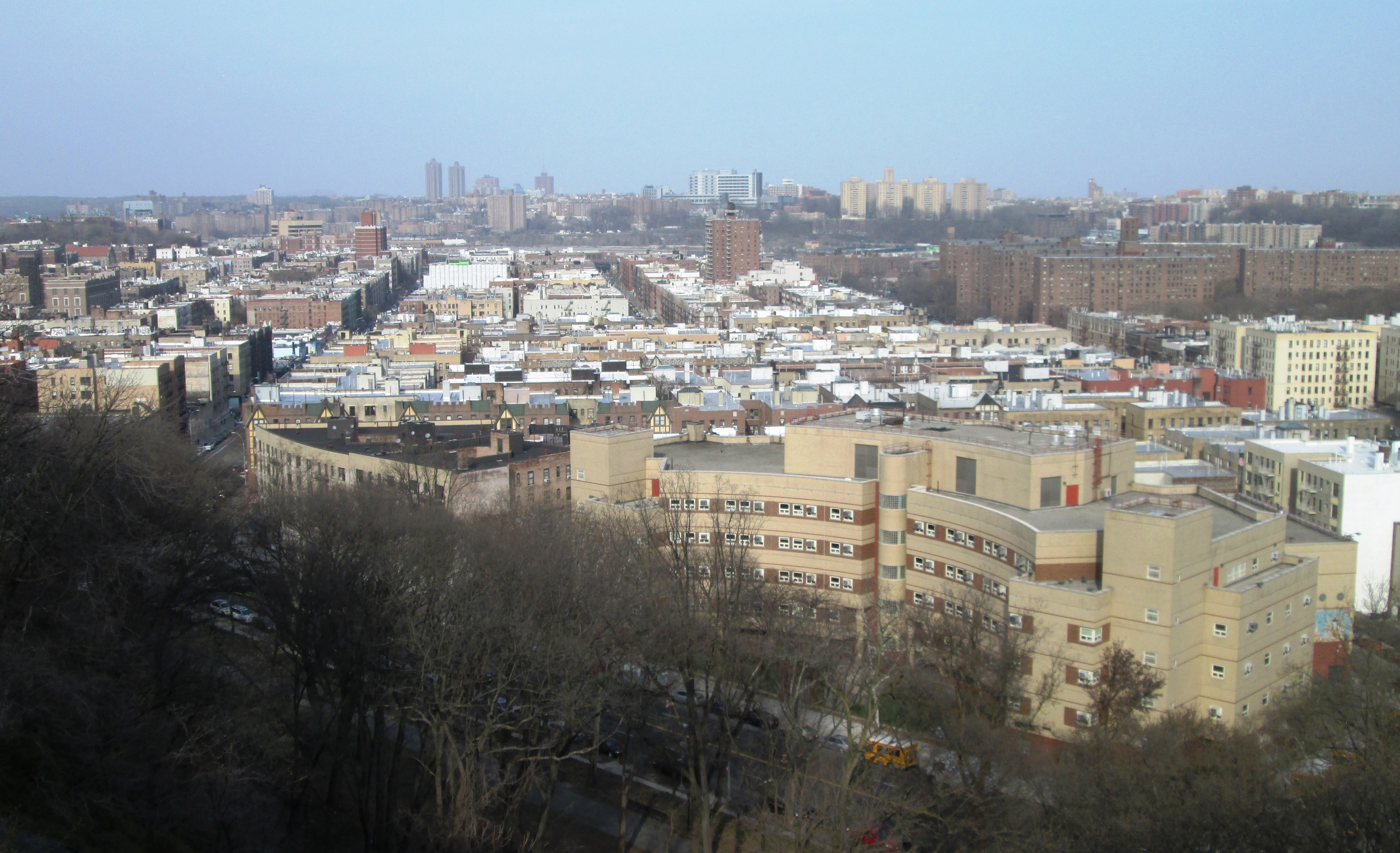
- Overview of Inwood from Fort Tryon Park in 2018; in the right foreground is the Salome Urena de Henriquez Campus of the NYC Public Schools system; The Bronx is in the background
- Interactive map of Inwood
- Coordinates: 40.867°N 73.922°W
- Country: United States
- State: New York
- City: New York City
- Borough: Manhattan
- Community District: Manhattan 12

Area
  - Total: 0.909 sq mi (2.35 km^{2})

Population (2010)
  - Total: 38,444
  - Density: 42,300/sq mi (16,300/km^{2})

Ethnicity
  - Hispanic: 72.9%
  - White: 17.3%
  - Black: 6.2%
  - Asian: 2.1%
  - Others: 1.5%

Economics
  - Median household income: $56,015
- Time zone: UTC−5 (Eastern)
  - Summer (DST): UTC−4 (EDT)
- ZIP Codes: 10034, 10040
- Area code: 212, 332, 646, and 917

Inwood is a neighborhood in the New York City borough of Manhattan, at the northern tip of Manhattan Island. It is bounded by the Hudson River to the west, Spuyten Duyvil Creek and Marble Hill to the north, the Harlem River to the east, and Washington Heights to the south.

Inwood is part of Manhattan Community District 12, and its primary ZIP Code is 10034. It is served by the 34th Precinct of the New York City Police Department and Engine Company 95/Ladder Company 36 of the New York City Fire Department. Politically, it is part of the New York City Council's 10th district.

== History ==
=== Lenape history ===
The north end of Manhattan, with its clam beds, cornfields, and annual fish runs, was described by the National Museum of the American Indian as the "best place to live" on the island before the Dutch and British colonists arrived in the 17th century. There was a large Lenape town straddling the Manhattan and Bronx sides of what is now called the Harlem River. Shorakapkok means 'sitting-down place' in the Munsee language.

=== Colonial history ===
On May 24, 1626, according to legend, Peter Minuit, the director general of the Dutch colony of New Netherland, bought the island from the indigenous Lenape people for 60 Dutch guilders and, the story goes, some trinkets. On the southern tip of the island Minuit founded New Amsterdam. A plaque (on a rock) marking what is believed to be the spot of the sale is in Inwood Hill Park, the only natural forest left in Manhattan.

During the British occupation of Manhattan in the American Revolutionary War, there was an encampment containing more than 60 huts occupied by Hessian troops between 201st and 204th Streets along Payson Avenue. The camp was discovered in 1914 by local archeologist and historian Reginald Bolton after a series of digs around the neighborhood.

=== 19th century to present ===
The area between 190th and 192nd Streets was occupied by the Fort George Amusement Park, a trolley park/amusement park, from 1895 to 1914. Its site is now a seating area in Highbridge Park, which itself was laid out in the late 19th and early 20th centuries.

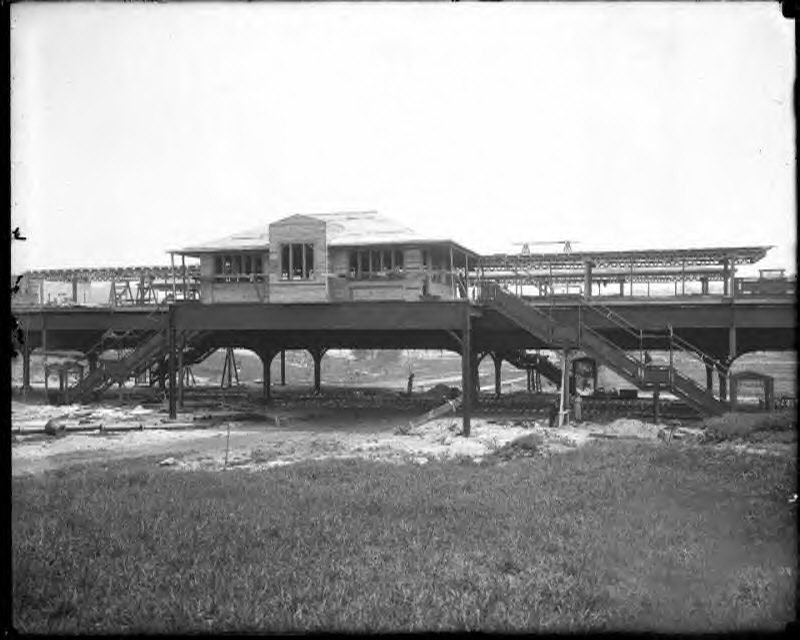
207th Street station (now serving the 1 train) under construction in 1906 in undeveloped fields

Inwood was a very rural section of Manhattan well into the early 20th century. Once the New York City Subway's IRT Broadway–Seventh Avenue Line, the modern 1 train, reached Inwood in 1906, speculative developers constructed numerous apartment buildings on the east side of Broadway. Construction continued into the 1930s, when the IND Eighth Avenue Line, the modern A train, reached Dyckman and 207th Streets along Broadway and the large estates west of Broadway (Seaman, Dyckman, Isham, etc.) were sold off and developed. Many of Inwood's impressive Art Deco apartment buildings were constructed during this period. The area around Dyckman Street and 10th Avenue formerly contained a stadium called the Dyckman Oval, with a capacity of 4,500 spectators, which hosted football games, boxing matches, and Negro league baseball games until it was demolished in 1938 and replaced by the Dyckman Houses public housing development in 1951.

The last family-owned farm in Manhattan is believed to have been in Inwood, close to the intersection of Broadway and 214th Street. It was operated by the Benedetto family and occupied an entire city block. The farm site was developed after being sold in 1954.

== Demographics ==
For census purposes, the New York City government classifies Inwood as part of a larger neighborhood tabulation area called Inwood and Marble Hill. Based on data from the 2010 United States census, the population of Inwood and Marble Hill was 46,746, a change of −2,341 (−5%) from the 49,087 counted in 2000. Covering an area of 405.79 acres (164.22 ha), the neighborhood had a population density of 115.2 inhabitants per acre (73,700/sq mi; 28,500/km^{2}). The racial makeup of the neighborhood was 15.1% (7,060) White, 9.1% (4,239) African American, 0.1% (64) Native American, 1.9% (884) Asian, 0% (5) Pacific Islander, 0.4% (179) from other races, and 1% (458) from two or more races. Hispanic or Latino of any race were 72.4% (33,857) of the population.

The racial composition of Inwood and Marble Hill changed moderately from 2000 to 2010, with the most significant changes being the Black population's decrease by 13% (661) and the Hispanic/Latino population's decrease by 5% (1,880). Meanwhile, the White population grew by 5% (335) and remained a minority, as with the Asian population which grew by 11% (86); the small population of all other races decreased by 24% (221).

The entirety of Community District 12, which comprises Inwood and Washington Heights, had 195,830 inhabitants as of NYC Health's 2018 Community Health Profile, with an average life expectancy of 81.4 years. This is about the same as the median life expectancy of 81.2 for all New York City neighborhoods. Most inhabitants are children and middle-aged adults: 33% are between the ages of 25 and 44, while 25% are between 45 and 64, and 19% are between 0 and 17. The ratio of college-aged and elderly residents was lower, at 10% and 13% respectively.

As of 2019, the median household income in Community District 12 was $42,000, compared to $73,000 in Manhattan and $53,000 in the entire city. In 2019, an estimated 25% of Community District 12 residents lived in poverty, compared to 18% in all of Manhattan and 21% in all of New York City. One in eight residents (12%) were unemployed, compared to 7% in Manhattan and 9% in New York City. Rent burden, or the percentage of residents who have difficulty paying their rent, is 53% in Community District 12, compared to the boroughwide and citywide rates of 45% and 51% respectively. Based on this calculation, as of 2018, Community District 12 is considered to be gentrifying: according to the Community Health Profile, the district was low-income in 1990 and has seen above-median rent growth up to 2010.

=== Trends ===
The residents of Inwood were substantially of Irish descent for much of the 20th century. The neighborhood exhibited a strong Irish identity with many Irish shops, pubs, and even a Gaelic football field in Inwood Hill Park. The second-largest group during this time was Jewish, an extension of the large Jewish population of Washington Heights. However, in the 1960s through the 1980s, many Irish and Jewish residents moved out to adjoining areas in other boroughs of New York City (such as the Riverdale and Spuyten Duyvil sections of the Bronx) and the suburbs (including communities in nearby Bergen County, New Jersey; Westchester County, New York; and Rockland County, New York) in a pattern consistent with overall trends in the city at that time. During the same period, there was a rise in the number of Dominican immigrants to the area.

Today, Inwood has a predominantly Dominican population, especially in the areas east of Broadway; it has the highest concentration of residents of Dominican descent in New York City. Hispanic residents made up 74% of Inwood's population as a whole, according to census data reported in 2009. Nearly half of the residents were born outside the US.

== Land use and terrain ==
=== Geography ===
Inwood is physically bounded by the Harlem River to the north and east, and the Hudson River to the west. It extends southward to Fort Tryon Park and alternatively Dyckman Street or Fairview Avenue farther south, depending on the source.

While Inwood is the northernmost neighborhood on the island of Manhattan, it is not the northernmost neighborhood of the entire borough of Manhattan. That distinction is held by Marble Hill, a neighborhood situated just north of Inwood, on what is properly the North American mainland bordering the Bronx. Marble Hill was isolated from Inwood and the rest of Manhattan in 1895 when the route of the Harlem River was altered by the construction of the Harlem River Ship Canal.

=== Geology ===
Inwood marble, a soft, white, metamorphic rock found in northern Manhattan, takes its name after the neighborhood. From the mid-17th to the late 18th century, commercial quarries dotted the area as the material was used for building construction. However, due to its susceptibility to erosion, builders eventually used alternate construction materials. Inwood marble was quarried for government buildings in lower Manhattan and Washington, D.C. Small pieces of marble can still be seen in the stone retaining walls around Isham Park.

The development of Inwood in the early 20th century resulted in the demolition of many rock outcroppings. However, several outcroppings still exist, including on Cooper Street between 204th and 207th Streets; at Broadway and West 216th Street; and in the garden of Holy Trinity Episcopal Church at Seaman Avenue and Cumming Street. The rock on Cooper Street contains a garden maintained by a nearby housing cooperative at 60 Cooper Street, which owns half of the rock.

The seismologically active Dyckman Street Fault runs east–west beneath the Dyckman Valley. As recently as 1989, activity of this fault caused a magnitude 2 earthquake.

=== Land use ===
Commercial retail uses are mainly located along Broadway, Dyckman Street, and West 207th Street. In recent years Dyckman Street west of Broadway has become a popular entertainment district with many restaurants and lounges. Offices are typically located on second floors over retail, or in the neighborhood's sole office building (a converted telephone building) at Broadway and West 215th Street. Inwood also contains one of Manhattan's few remaining C-8 zoning districts, which concentrates automotive uses on the northern stretches of Broadway.

Industrial uses, including depots for subway (207th Street Yard), bus (Kingsbridge Bus Depot), and sanitation (Manhattan North), exist primarily along Sherman Creek, an inlet of the Harlem River. The creek and surrounding industrial area is bounded by Dyckman Street to the south, Tenth Avenue to the west, and 207th Street to the north. There has been an initiative among politicians over the last few years to re-zone this area for residential and commercial use, and to create public access to the waterfront. Utility company Consolidated Edison and the City of New York own some of the property in this area.

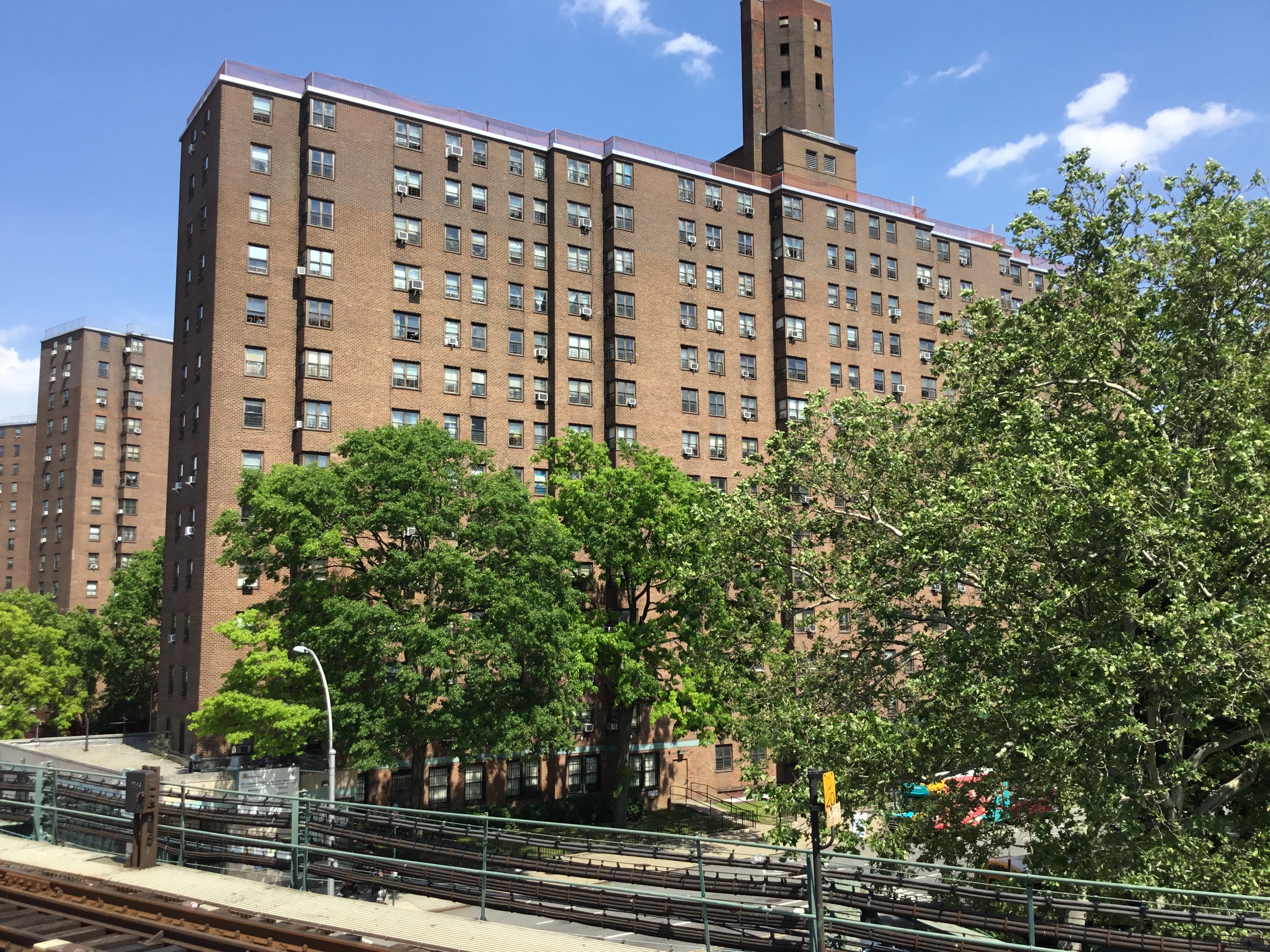
The Dyckman Houses

The major residential land use in Inwood is multifamily five- to eight-story prewar apartment buildings. Most of the remaining detached and semi-detached houses on Manhattan Island are located in Inwood, nestled between apartment buildings. Adjacent to Sherman Creek is Inwood's public housing development, known as the Dyckman Houses and constructed in 1951.

=== Real estate ===
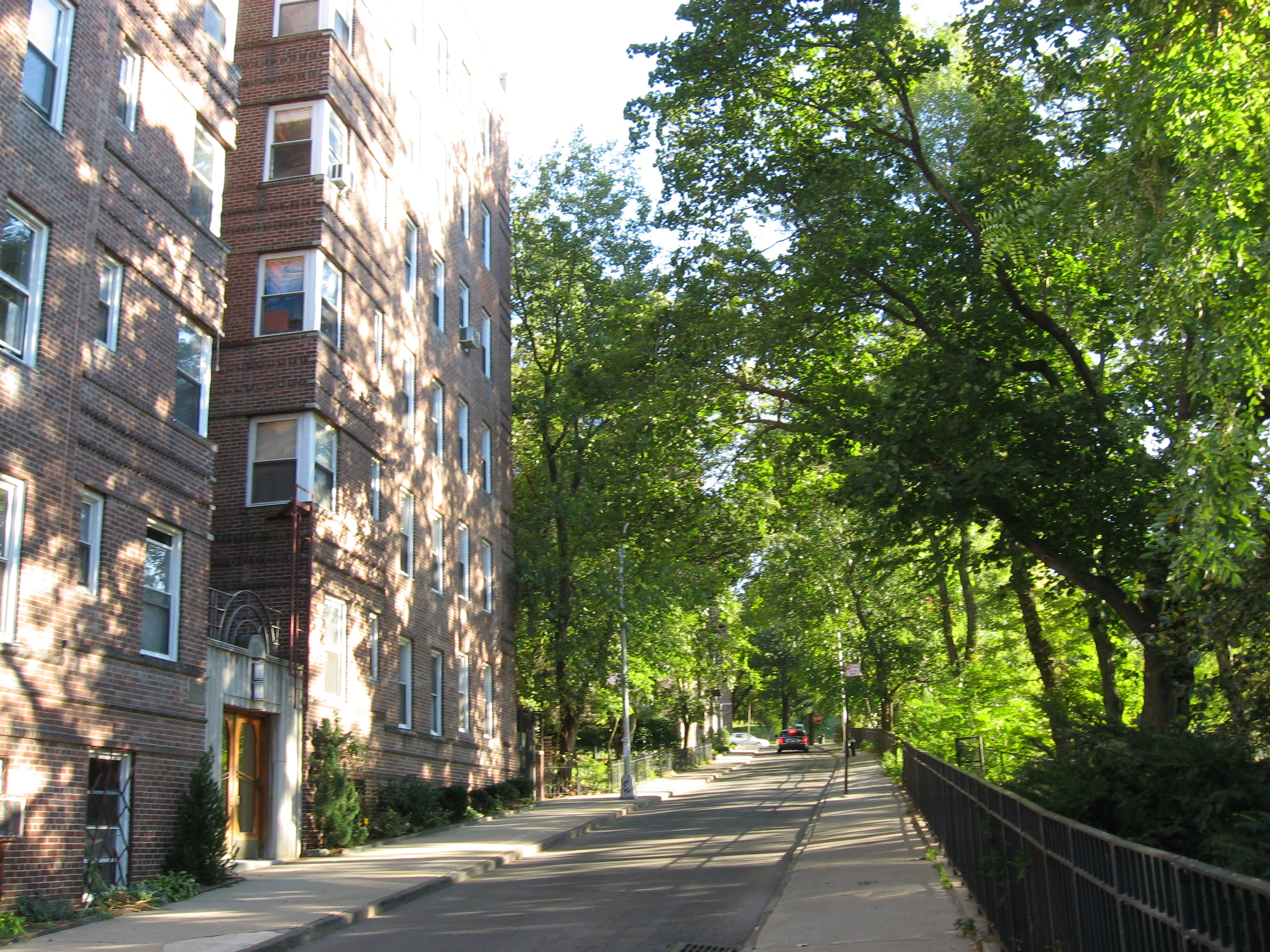
A residential street in Inwood

Inwood's real estate rents and values are sharply bifurcated between east and west. According to Manhattan Community Board 12, the districts east of Broadway are predominantly lower-income. This area is also more industrial and commercial and has fewer parks and street trees. Real estate values and rents are correspondingly lower than the area west of Broadway. Almost all of Inwood's co-ops and all of the private houses are located on the west side of Broadway. According to one study in 2019, Inwood had the lowest average rents in Manhattan.

In 2015, New York City began soliciting community comments on a major rezoning proposal for Inwood. The New York City Economic Development Corporation proposed to alter the area's 50-year-old then-current zoning plan by dividing Inwood into five sub-districts called "the tip of Manhattan", "Upland Wedge", "Upland Core", "Commercial U" and "Sherman Creek". Some of these sub-districts would be rezoned to encourage the construction of new commercial space and housing. A resident recalls being told by a city planner, "Don't think you can keep this nice neighborhood all to yourselves." The rezoning proposal triggered much feedback from the community, including a sleep-in at Councilman Ydanis Rodriguez's office. In August 2018, the New York City Council approved a measure to rezone the neighborhood. The rezoning of Inwood allows for the construction of buildings of up to 30 stories in some areas targeted for redevelopment while introducing an 8-story height limit to many existing residential areas. Following the rezoning, over $610 million in real estate was purchased.

The rezoning includes 2,600 units of affordable housing. It was met with pushback from locals, who formed a group called "Northern Manhattan is Not for Sale". Expressing concerns about gentrification and rezoning, the group sued to halt the rezoning in December 2018. The plaintiffs cited concerns over the city's environmental review process, saying the review should have included a racial impact study. The city stated that the review complied with the city's legal standards and that a racial impact study was unnecessary. The New York Supreme Court initially ruled in favor of the plaintiffs in December 2019, but it was overturned on appeal in July 2020. In part as a result of the lawsuit, the City Council passed a bill in June 2021, requiring developers to conduct a study of up to two years of potential displacement and gentrification trends and effects before starting a new project.

== Institutions and landmarks ==
=== Museums and cultural centers ===
The oldest building in Inwood is the Dyckman House, the oldest farmhouse in Manhattan, on Broadway at 204th Street. It is a New York City designated landmark and operates as a historic house museum.

In 2024, the state allocated $10 million for the Dominican Center for the Arts and Culture. The cultural center and museum is planned to be located at 375 West 207th Street.

Another cultural center, People's Theatre: Centro Cultural Inmigrante, began construction in 2023 as part of a mixed-use residential development on 206th Street. It opened in 2026.

=== Other points of interest ===
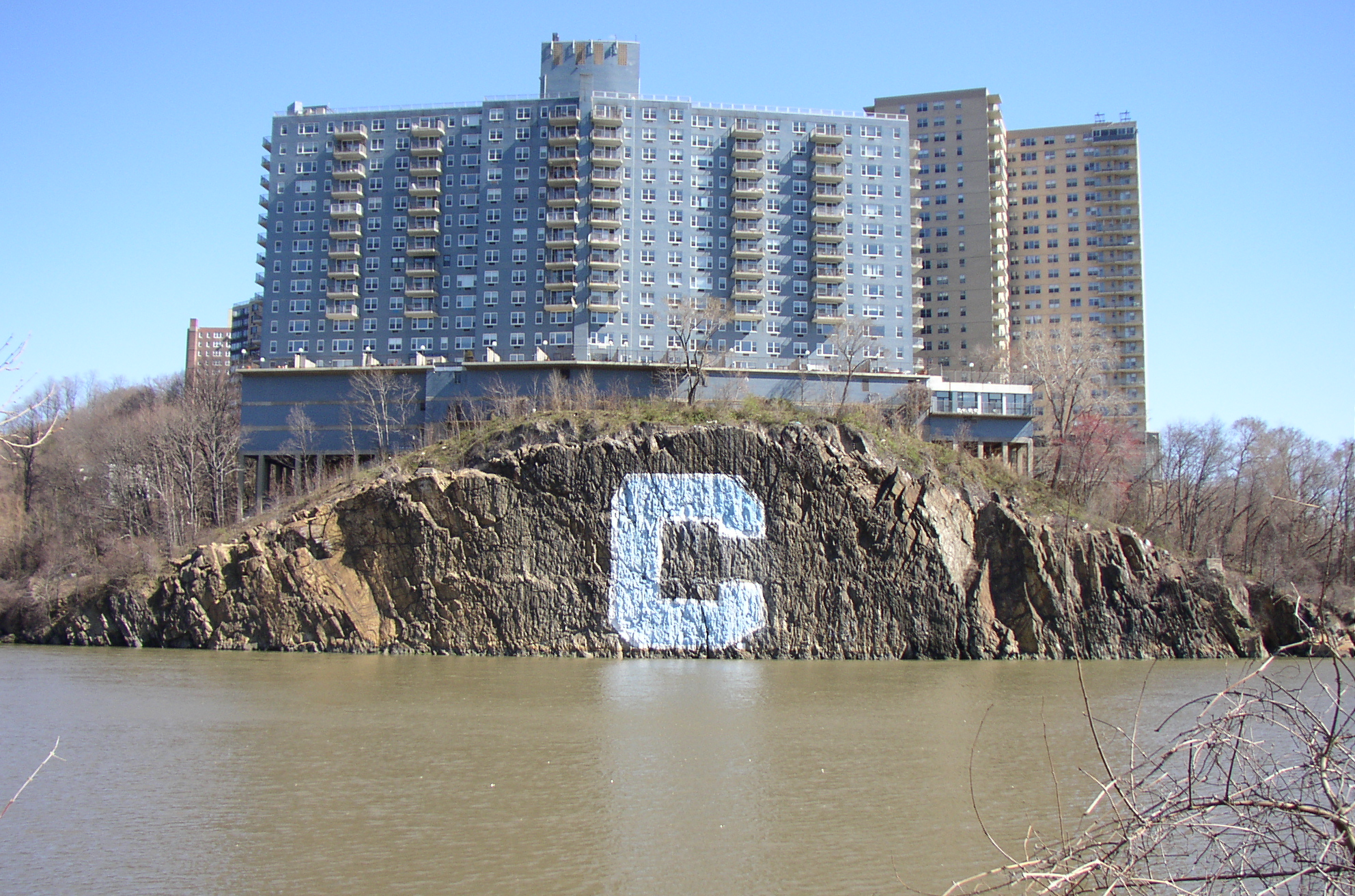
The Columbia "C" from the Spuyten Duyvil Creek

From Inwood Hill Park, one can view a 100-foot (30 m)-tall Columbia "C" painted on the face of a rock cut across the Harlem River on the Bronx shore. This collegiate logo has been in place for approximately a half-century, though it is not clear who exactly maintains the painted letter in the present day. Looking west from Inwood Hill Park across the Hudson River, one can view the New Jersey Palisades. Looking east from Inwood, the former NYU campus in University Heights, Bronx, now Bronx Community College, towers above the east end of the University Heights Bridge.

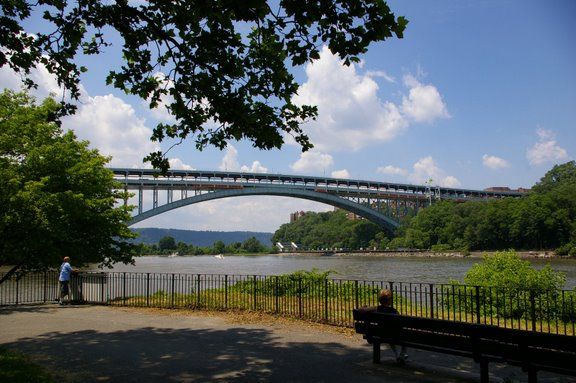
Henry Hudson Bridge seen from Inwood Hill Park

Bridges spanning Spuyten Duyvil Creek include the Henry Hudson Bridge, the longest fixed arch bridge in the world when built in 1936, and the Spuyten Duyvil Bridge, a railroad swing bridge reconstructed numerous times since originally opening in 1849. Road bridges are the Broadway Bridge and the University Heights Bridge, both important local structures.

Inwood has one small historic district, the Park Terrace West-West 217th Street district, designated in 2018.

The Inwood Greenmarket takes place on Isham Street on Saturdays, year round.

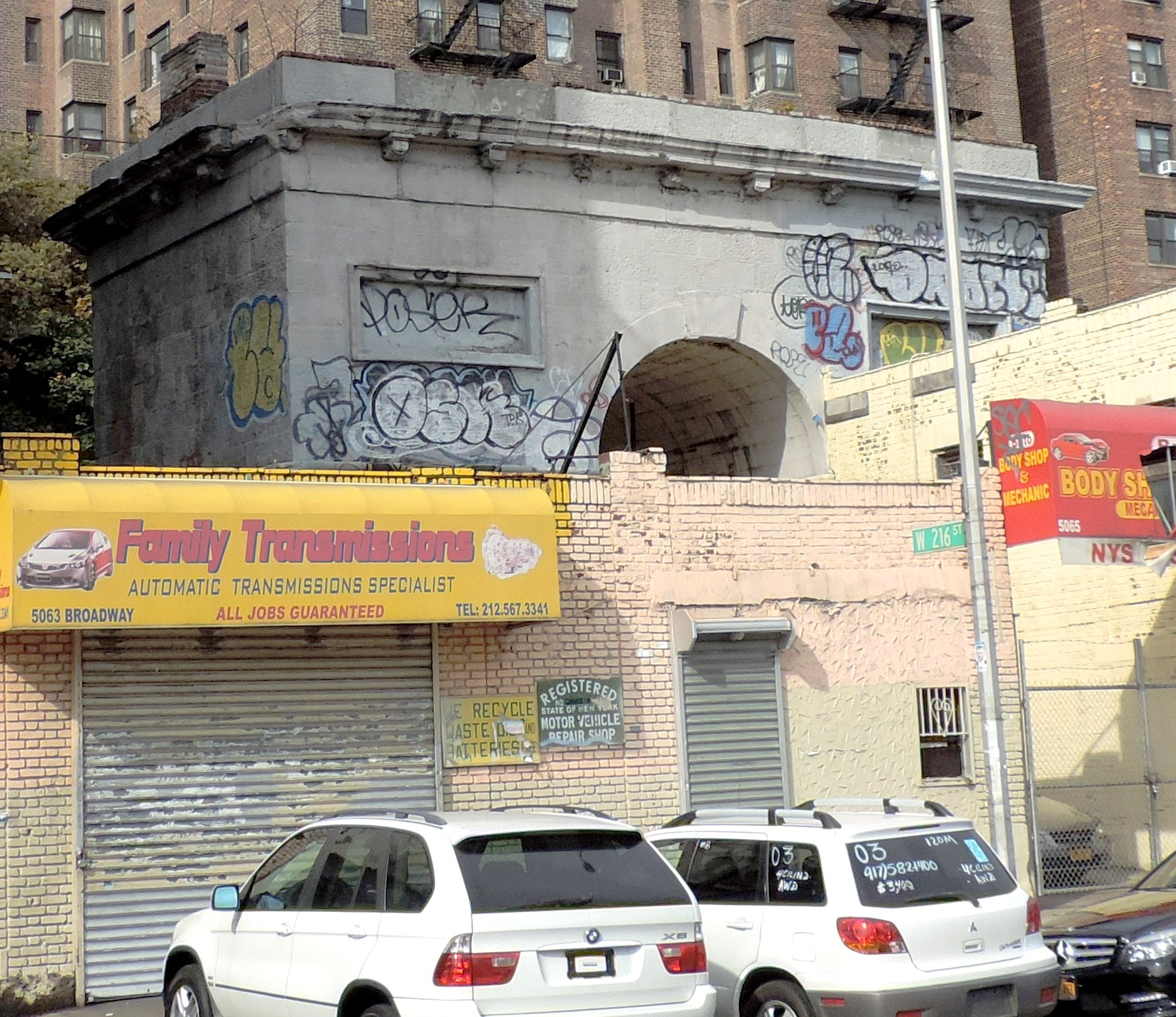
The Seaman-Drake Arch was the entrance to a 19th-century country estate; now it is almost hidden by later commercial buildings.

The Seaman-Drake Arch, located on Broadway at 216th Street, is one of only two free-standing arches in Manhattan, the other being the Washington Square Arch. The Seaman-Drake Arch was built in 1855 of local Inwood marble. It is the last remaining structure of the mansion that formerly stood there.

At the North Cove at 207th Street and the Harlem River, located just south of the 207th Street Yard, both the shoreline and the water just off it are a wetland refuge for several dozen species of birds. The area was rehabilitated by James Cataldi, sometimes called the "Birdman of Inwood".

== Parks ==
=== NYC Parks facilities ===
Inwood Hill Park

Inwood Hill Park, on the Hudson River, is a very large and old-growth forested city park. It is known for its caves that were used by the Lenape before Europeans arrived, and the last salt marsh in Manhattan. Birders come to the park to see waterfowl, raptors, and a wide variety of migratory birds. The wooded section, consisting mostly of abandoned former summer estates, features the last natural forest standing on Manhattan Island. Athletic fields and courts, three playgrounds, a waterfront promenade, and ten miles of hiking trails are also prominent components of the park.

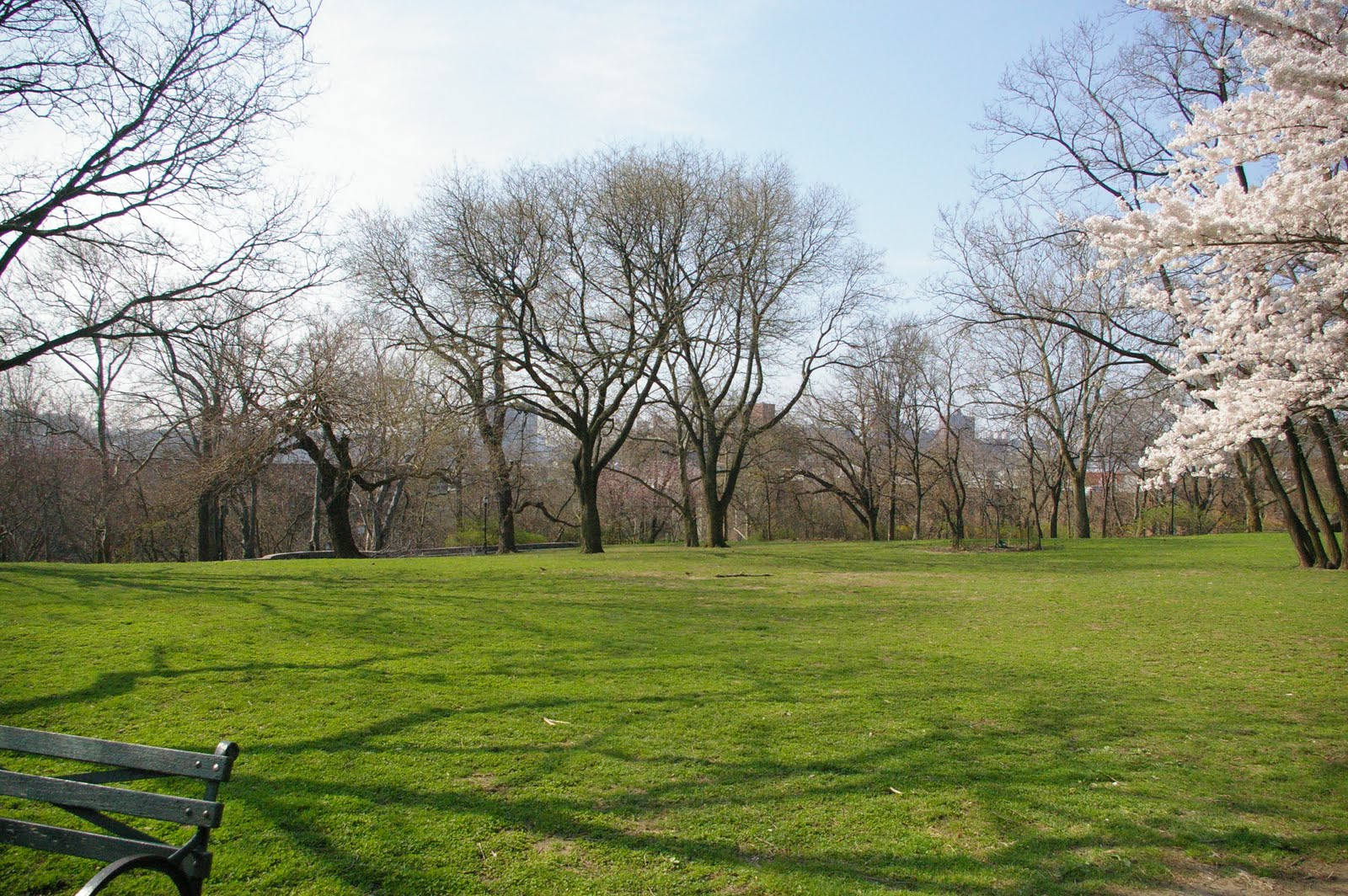
Isham Park

Isham Park sits roughly between Broadway, Isham Street, Seaman Avenue, and West 214th and 215th Streets. The park once extended to the Harlem River, but after the creation of Inwood Hill Park and the reconfiguration of area streets, Seaman Avenue became the northwest boundary in practice. (An irregular parcel of land on the eastern edge of Inwood Hill Park remains legally zoned as Isham Park.) The extent of the current park now equals that of the original Isham estate. The Isham mansion, which originally came with the park gift, was torn down in the 1940s due to its deteriorating condition.

Other parks in or adjoining Inwood include Sherman Creek Park (Swindler Cove), Fort Washington Park, Fort Tryon Park, and Highbridge Park.

=== Columbia facilities ===
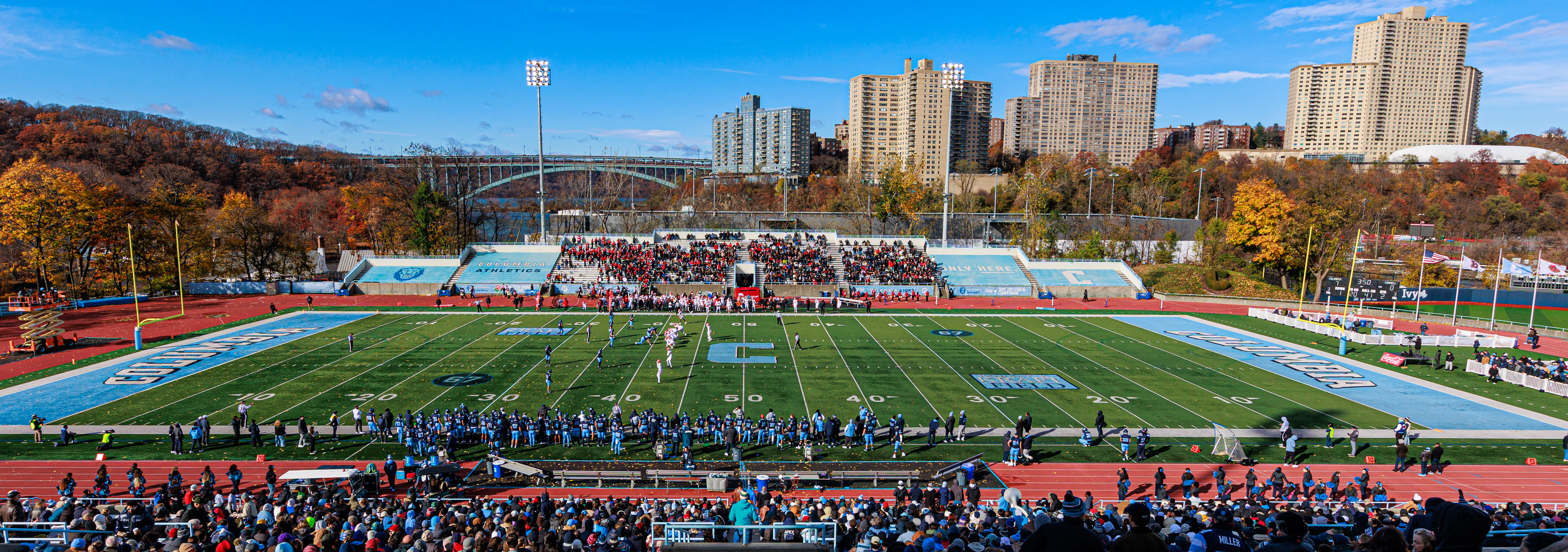
Wien Stadium

Columbia University's 23-acre (93,000 m^{2}) athletic fields have been located in Inwood since the 1920s. They are known today as the Baker Athletics Complex, though locals still use the historical name of "Baker Field". The football stadium within the complex, officially Robert K. Kraft Field at Lawrence A. Wien Stadium, can accommodate 17,000 fans and was noted by Sports Illustrated as "one of the most beautiful places in the country to watch a football game" due to the scenic views of the Henry Hudson Bridge and the New Jersey Palisades from the home stands. In addition, the baseball field at the complex hosted the first televised sporting event in the United States when NBC broadcast the game between Columbia and Princeton in 1939.

In January 2014, a 1-acre (0.40 ha) park called Muscota Marsh opened to the public between Inwood Hill Park and Baker Field as part of an agreement with the city for the development of the Campbell Athletic Center at West 218th Street and Broadway. This waterfront park was built by Columbia and is jointly administered by the city parks department and the university.

The Inwood waterfront is also home to Columbia University's Boathouse, the "1929 Boathouse". It stands next to the "Gould-Remmer Boathouse" which was originally constructed in 1895 as the Gould Boathouse at 116th Street on the Hudson River and was relocated here in 1989. This new structure now houses the Ivy League school's crew team and hosts inter-collegiate rowing competitions. In July 2018, a harbor seal nicknamed "Sealy" started showing up by the structure, garnering media attention.

=== Community gardens ===
The Lt. William Tighe Triangle, aka the Riverside-Inwood Neighborhood Garden (RING), is the northernmost piece of Ft. Tryon Park and lies at the confluence of Riverside Drive, Dyckman Street, Broadway, and Seaman Avenue. It is Inwood's oldest community garden, having been founded in 1984. Bruce's Garden is another community garden, located in the northeast corner of Isham Park.

== Local newspaper ==
Manhattan Times is a free English/Spanish bilingual community newspaper serving Spanish-speaking areas of Upper Manhattan. It was founded in 1999 or 2000 by Luís A. Miranda Jr., Roberto Ramírez Sr., and David Keisman. The newspaper features stories about news and events of interest to residents on the city and neighborhood level, and is funded in part by private advertisements in addition to public service announcements.

== Police and crime ==
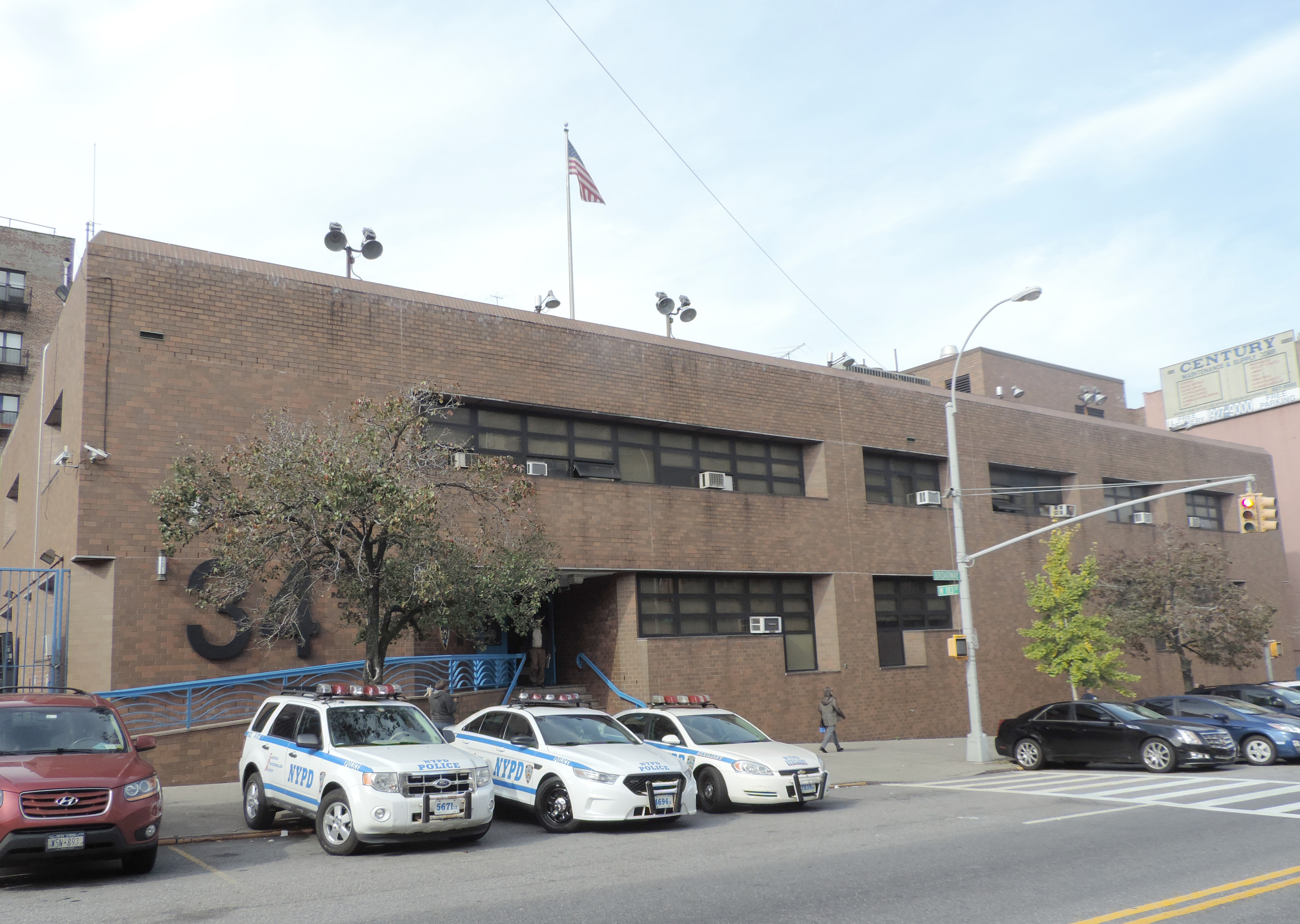
The 34th Precinct on 183rd Street and Broadway

Inwood is served by the 34th Precinct of the NYPD, located at 4295 Broadway, along with Washington Heights north of 179th Street. The 34th Precinct ranked 23rd- safest out of 69 patrol areas for per-capita crime in 2010. As of 2018, the neighborhood had a non-fatal assault hospitalization rate of 43 per 100,000 people, lower than the citywide rate of 59 per 100,000; however, its incarceration rate of 482 per 100,000 adults was slightly higher than the citywide rate of 425 per 100,000.

In 2020, the 34th Precinct reported 7 murders, 16 rapes, 205 robberies, 213 felony assaults, 226 burglaries, 444 grand larcenies, and 166 grand larcenies auto. Crime in these categories fell by 42.1% between 1998 and 2020.

== Fire safety ==
Inwood is served by the New York City Fire Department (FDNY)'s Engine Company 95/Ladder Company 36/Foam Unit 95, located at 29 Vermilyea Avenue.

== Health ==
As of 2018, preterm births in Manhattan Community District 12 were lower than the city average, though births to teenage mothers were higher. In Community District 12, there were 73 preterm births per 1,000 live births (compared to 87 per 1,000 citywide), and 23.3 births to teenage mothers per 1,000 live births (compared to 19.3 per 1,000 citywide). Community District 12 has a population of residents who are uninsured. In 2018, this population of uninsured residents was estimated to be 14%, compared to the 12% of residents citywide.

The concentration of fine particulate matter, the deadliest type of air pollutant, in Community District 12 is 0.0078 milligrams per cubic metre (7.8×10^{−9} oz/ft^{3}), slightly greater than the city average of 0.0075. Thirteen percent of Community District 12 residents are smokers, similar to the city average of 14%. In Community District 12, 26% of residents are obese, 13% are diabetic, and 28% have high blood pressure—compared to the citywide averages of 24%, 11%, and 28% respectively. Additionally, 24% of children are obese, more than the citywide average of 20%.

Eighty-one percent of residents eat some fruits and vegetables every day, less than the citywide average of 87%. In 2018, 68% of residents described their health as "good", "very good", or "excellent", also less than the citywide average of 78%. For every supermarket in Community District 12, there are 13 bodegas.

The overall life expectancy of Community District 12 is 84, 2.8 years greater than the citywide average. Its rates of premature death from cancer (39.1 per 100,000) and heart disease (26.1 per 100,000) are significantly lower than the citywide rates, although its drug-related death rate (9.6 per 100,000) is similar and its suicide death rate (7.2 per 100,000) is higher.

NewYork-Presbyterian's Allen Hospital is located on Broadway and 220th Street, directly across from Marble Hill. The Jewish Memorial Hospital, built on Broadway and 196th Street in 1937 with help from Public Works Administration loans, was named in commemoration of Jewish World War I veterans. However, the hospital closed in 1983 after federal inspections found its medical service inadequate, cutting its Medicare and Medicaid funds and leaving Inwood "medically underserved".

== Politics ==
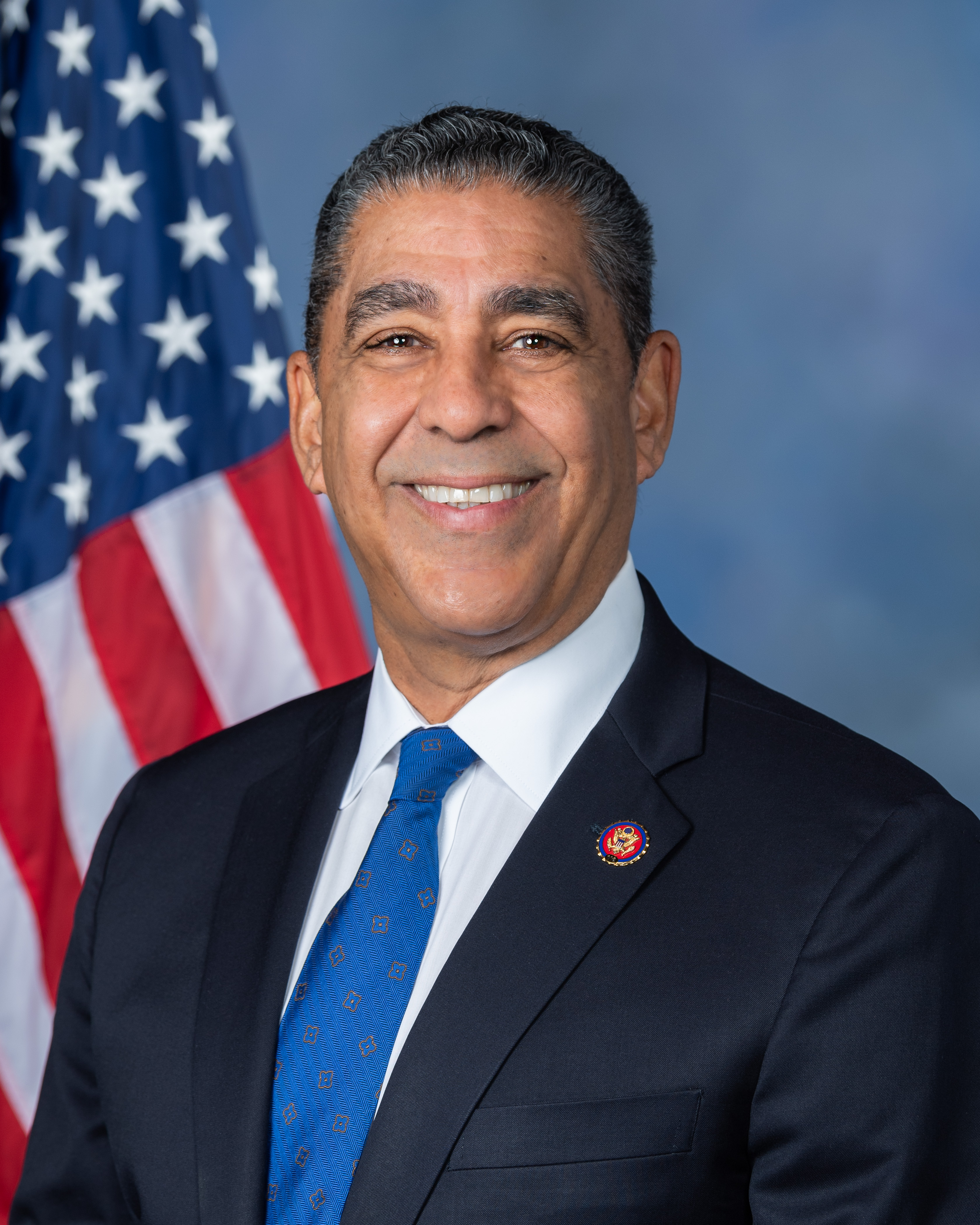
Adriano Espaillat

Politically, Inwood is in New York's 13th congressional district for the U.S. House of Representatives, represented by Democrat Adriano Espaillat since 2017. On the state level, it is in the New York State Senate's 31st district, represented by Democrat Robert Jackson, and the New York State Assembly's 71st and 72nd districts, represented respectively by Democrats Al Taylor and Manny De Los Santos. On the city level, it is In the New York City Council's 10th district, represented by Democrat Carmen De La Rosa.

== Post offices and ZIP Codes ==
Depending on how its southern boundary is defined, Inwood occupies one or two ZIP Codes. The area south of Dyckman Street is in 10040 while the area north of Dyckman Street is in 10034. The United States Postal Service operates two post offices near Inwood: the Fort George Station at 4558 Broadway and the Inwood Station at 90 Vermilyea Avenue. The Inwood Station, built in 1937 in Colonial Revival style, was listed on the National Register of Historic Places in 1989.

== Education ==
Community District 12 has fewer college graduates and more high school dropouts compared to the borough and city as a whole. Only 38% of residents age 25 and older have a college education or higher, compared to 64% boroughwide and 43% citywide; meanwhile, 29% of adults in Community District 12 did not finish high school, compared to 13% boroughwide and 19% citywide. Elementary school absenteeism is similar to the rest of the city: as of 2018, 19% of elementary school students missed 20 or more days per school year, compared to 18% boroughwide and 20% citywide.

Inwood is part of District 6, along with Washington Heights and Hamilton Heights. Of the district's 19,939 students as of 2019, 85% were Hispanic/Latino, 7% were Black, 5% were White, and 3% were any other race; in addition, 29% were English Language Learners, and 22% were Students with Disabilities. Of all students in the cohort set to graduate in 2019, 74% in District 6 did so by August 2019, compared to 77% citywide. The district rate was significantly lower for males (69%), English Language Learners (52%), and Students with Disabilities (49%). As of 2019, one-quarter of District 6 students were English Language Learners (defined as students who require support to learn English as a second language), of whom 96% were Hispanic or Latino.

=== Schools ===
==== Public schools ====
The New York City Department of Education operates public schools in Inwood as part of Community School District 6. As with most other school districts in New York City, District 6 has both zoned schools, which take students mainly from a small area in the neighborhood, and unzoned schools, which admit students from anywhere in the district. Zoned public elementary and elementary/middle schools include:

- PS 5 Ellen Lurie (grades PK-5)
- PS/IS 18 Park Terrace (grades K-8)
- PS 98 Shorac Kappock (grades PK-5)
- PS 152 Dyckman Valley (grades PK-5)
- Paula Hedbavny School (grades K-8)

Unzoned elementary or elementary/middle schools include:

- PS 178 Professor Juan Bosch (grades K-5)
- Amistad Dual Language School (grades K-8)
- Muscota New School (grades K-5)
- Oscar De La Renta Educational Campus (grades K-8)
- Washington Heights Academy (grades PK-8)

Middle schools include:

- Harold O. Levy School (grades 6–8)
- MS 322 (grades 6–8)

Inwood also has the High School for Excellence and Innovation located on the corner of Academy Street and Broadway. It is a transfer school, founded in 2009 and serving grades 9 to 12.

==== Charter and private schools ====
In the last decade charter schools have become predominant in Inwood. Many are part of networks with sister campuses in nearby Washington Heights.

- Amber Inwood Elementary (K-4)
- Amber Kingsbridge (5–8) located with Amber Inwood
- Zeta Inwood Elementary (PK-4)
- Zeta Manhattan Middle (5–8) located with Zeta Inwood
- Inwood Academy Elementary (K-4)
- Inwood Academy Middle (5–8)
- Inwood Academy High (9–12)
- The Equity Project Middle (5–8)
- School in Square Early Childhood (PK-K)
- School in the Square Elementary (1–5)
- School in the Square High (9–12)

There are only a few remaining private religious schools in Inwood:

- Good Shepherd School, a PK–8 Roman Catholic school
- Manhattan Christian Academy, a PK–8 nondenominational Christian school

There is one higher-education classroom campus in Inwood:

- CUNY In the Heights, community college classes jointly administered by Hostos and BMCC.

=== Library ===
The New York Public Library (NYPL) operates the Inwood branch at 4790 Broadway. The first library in Inwood opened in 1902 as a partnership between the NYPL and the Dyckman Library, and the NYPL opened several small branches in Inwood in 1923. These branches were consolidated with the opening of the current three-story branch in 1952. The Inwood branch was relocated to a temporary location across the street in 2020 for construction of a mixed-use complex on the site that combines affordable apartments with a new library facility in the base.

== Transportation ==
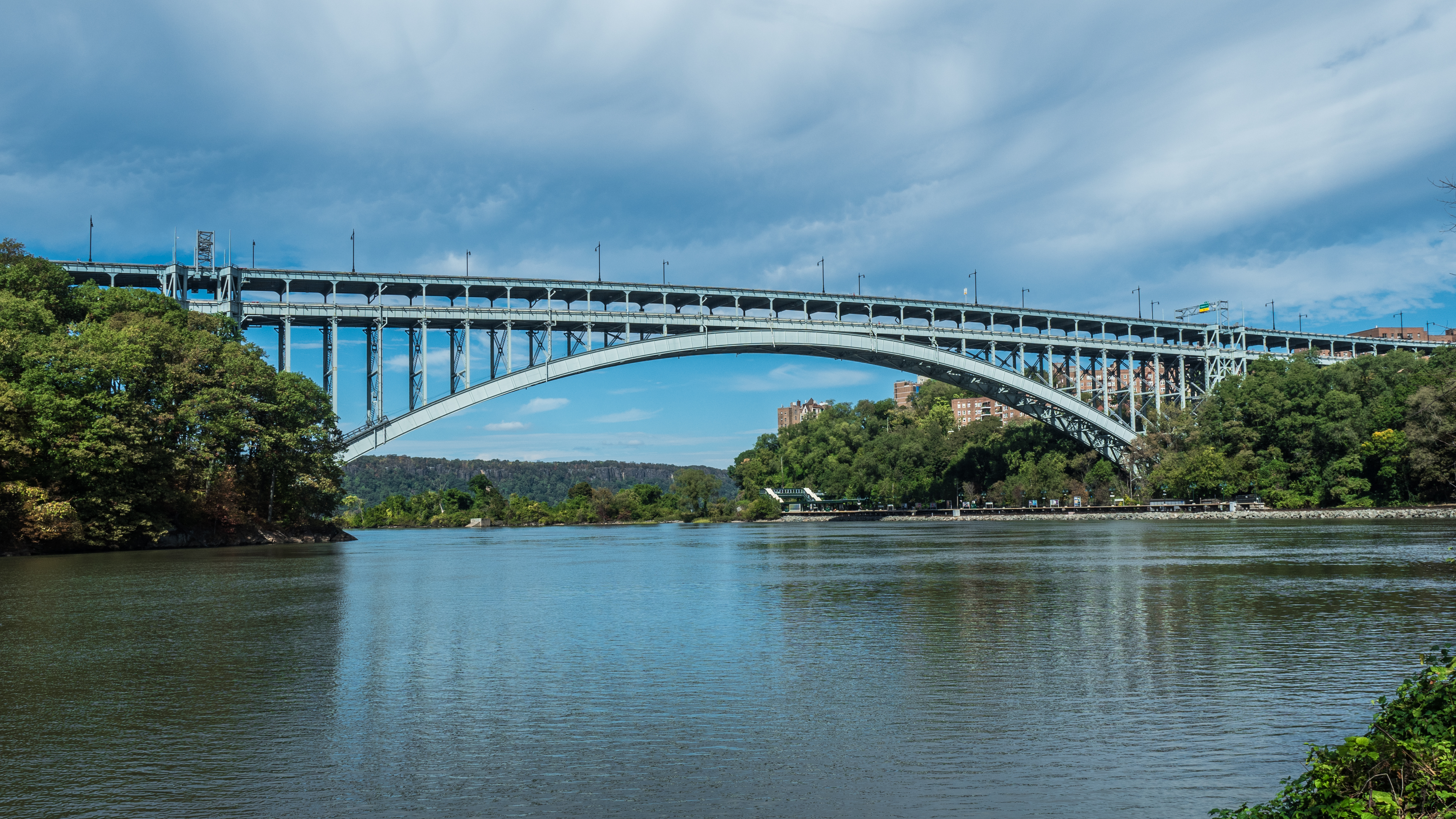
The Henry Hudson Bridge

Inwood's main local thoroughfare is Broadway, which is co-designated US 9 at this point. Highway access to the area is via the Henry Hudson Parkway to the west, the Harlem River Drive to the southeast (ending at Dyckman Street), and the Alexander Hamilton Bridge over the Harlem River from the Trans-Manhattan Expressway to the Cross Bronx Expressway (both of which carry I-95 and U.S. 1). Other bridges to the area include the Washington Bridge at 181st Street, crossing the Harlem River to the Bronx; the University Heights Bridge, from 207th Street in Manhattan across the Harlem River to Fordham Road in the Bronx; the Broadway Bridge, across the Spuyten Duyvil Creek north to Marble Hill; and the Henry Hudson Bridge across Spuyten Duyvil Creek to the Bronx. Inwood's main commercial shopping streets are Broadway, Dyckman Street, and West 207th Street. Manhattan's first Slow Zone was installed on the side streets west of Broadway in 2012; it is similar to other Slow Zones citywide installed as part of Vision Zero, an initiative commenced by mayor Bill de Blasio in 2014 to eliminate traffic deaths.

=== Public transportation ===
Public transportation service is provided by the Metropolitan Transportation Authority, through the New York City Subway and MTA Regional Bus Operations. The Metro-North Railroad's Hudson Line has a station just over the Broadway Bridge at Marble Hill as well as across the University Heights Bridge in University Heights.

==== Subway ====
Inwood's New York City Subway stations are located along two corridors: the IND Eighth Avenue Line on Broadway and the IRT Broadway–Seventh Avenue Line on Nagle and Tenth Avenues. The Broadway corridor's underground stations at Dyckman Street and Inwood–207th Street (a subway terminus) are served by the A train. Along Nagle and Tenth Avenues the elevated Dyckman Street, 207th Street, and 215th Street stations are served by the 1 train. Out of these stations, only the Inwood–207th Street IND and Dyckman Street IRT stations are accessible.

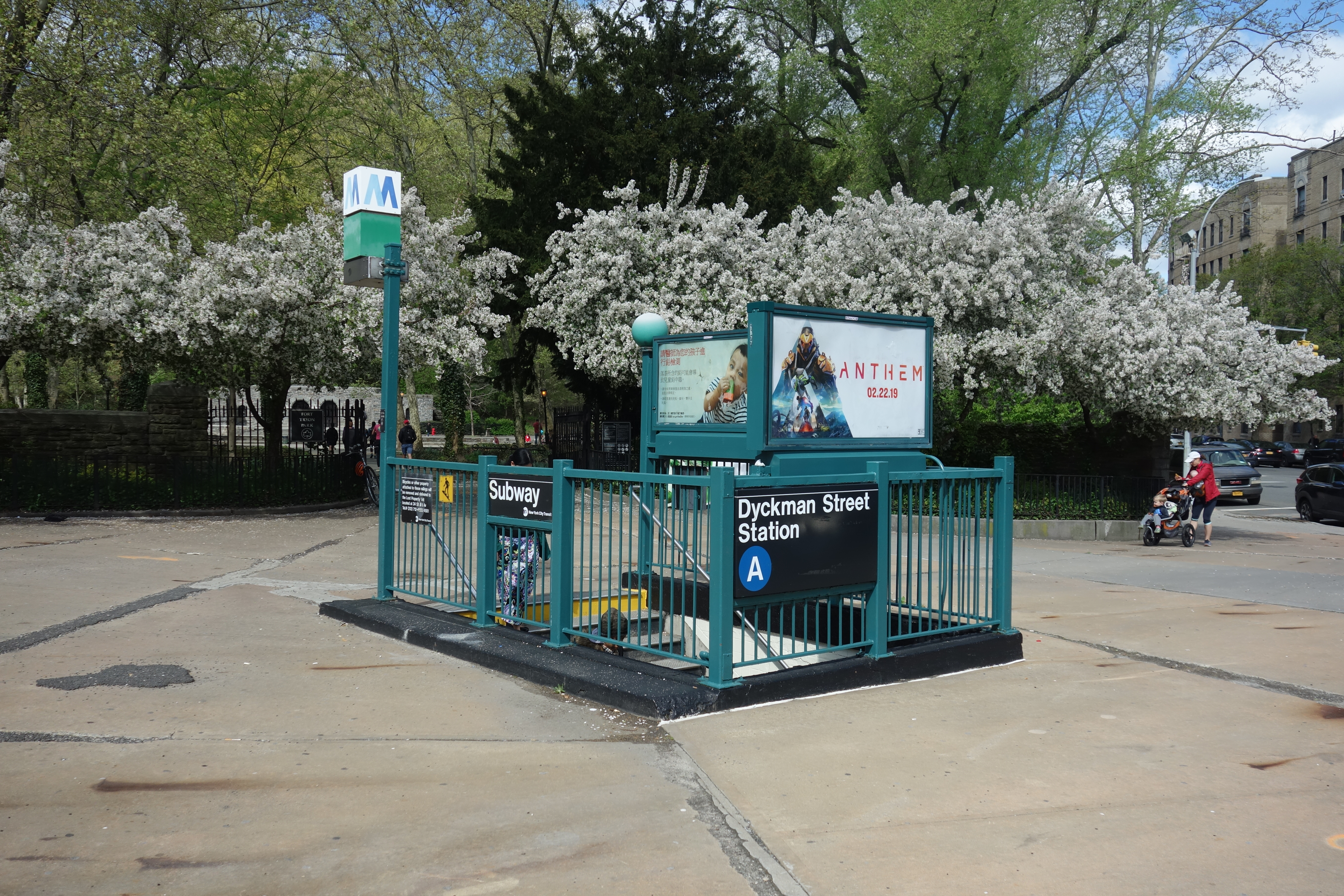
Entrance to the Dyckman Street IND station on Broadway, in front of Anne Loftus Playground

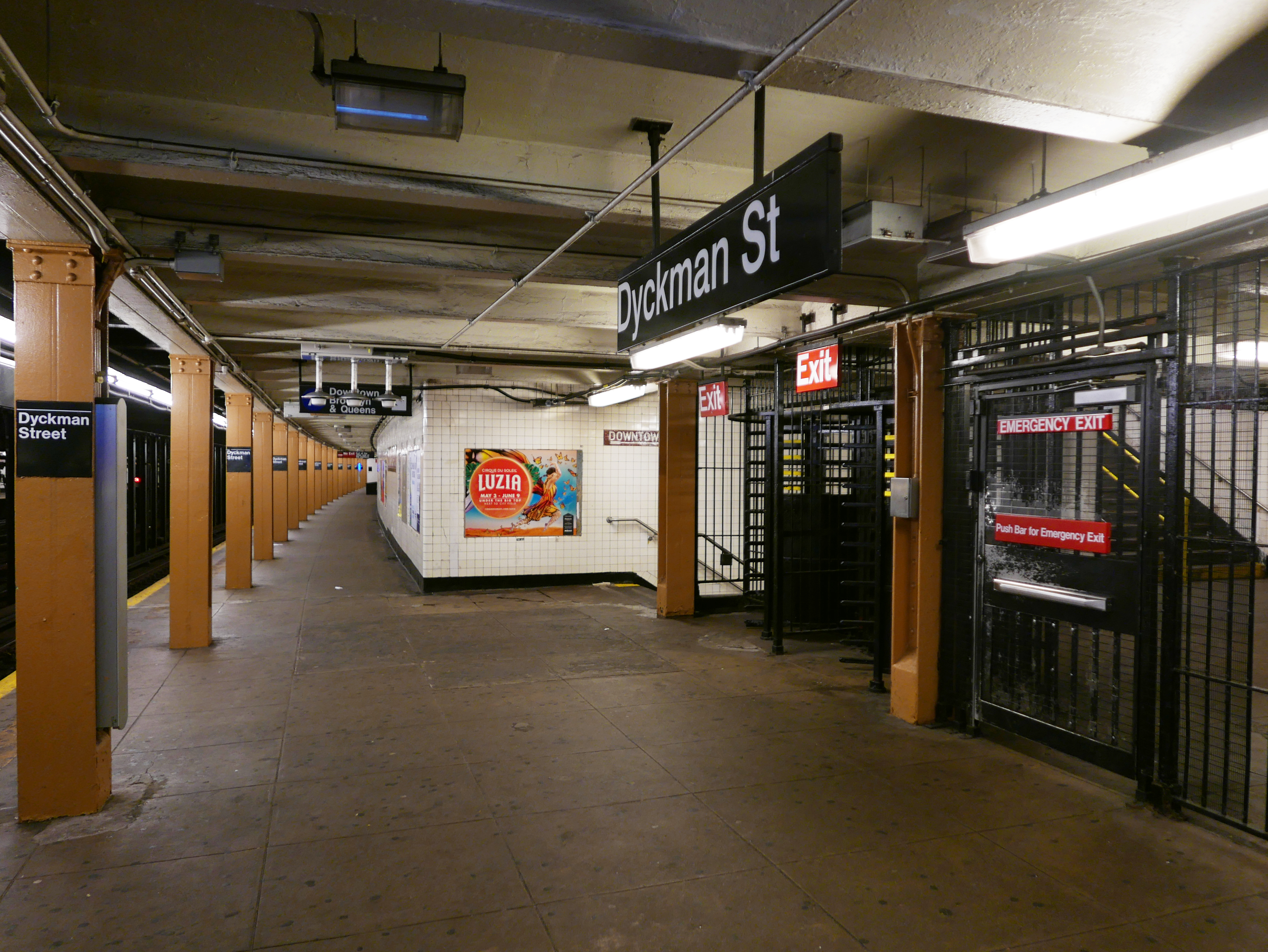
The Dyckman Street IND station's northbound exit

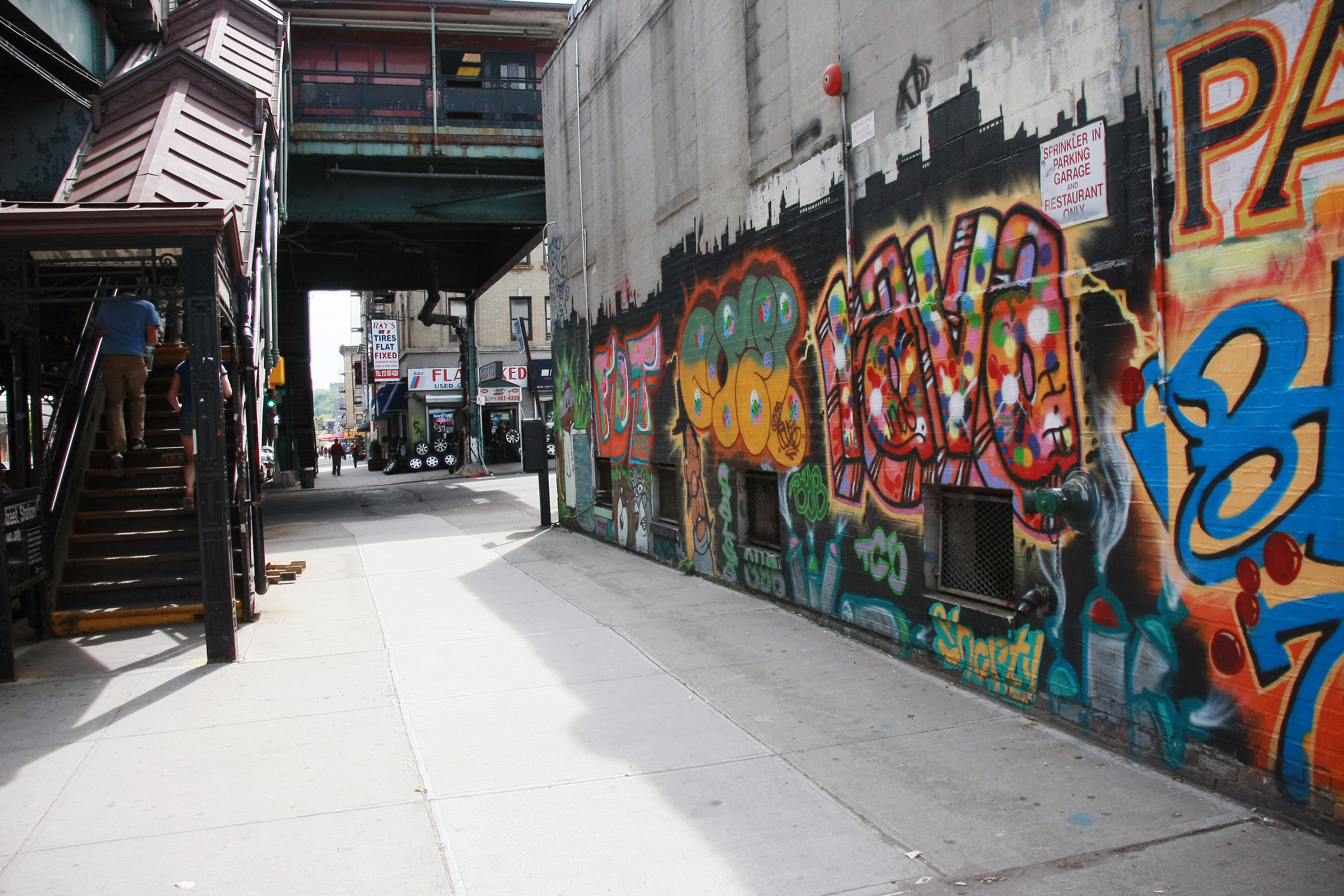
Entrance to the elevated 215th Street station on Tenth Avenue

==== Bus ====
Inwood is also served by the following MTA Regional Bus Operations bus routes:

- M100: to East Harlem via Broadway, Dyckman Street, and Tenth Avenue
- Bx7: to College of Mount Saint Vincent via Broadway
- Bx12: to Bay Plaza Shopping Center / Orchard Beach, Bronx via 207th Street and Fordham Road–Pelham Parkway
- Bx12 SBS: to Bay Plaza Shopping Center via 207th Street and Fordham Road–Pelham Parkway
- Bx20: to Riverdale, Bronx or Washington Heights via Broadway
- BxM1: express to Riverdale, Bronx or Midtown Manhattan via East Side

=== Cycling ===
Bicycle infrastructure in Inwood is slowly expanding, though at a slower pace than the rest of Manhattan. Painted lanes are located on Sherman Avenue, Seaman Avenue (northbound) and the western portion of Dyckman Street. Seaman Avenue (southbound) and West 218th Street are marked with sharrows (shared lane markings). Protected bike lanes run along most of Dyckman Street. The Manhattan Waterfront Greenway can be accessed from Inwood on both the Hudson and Harlem River sides; in addition, a 0.75-mile (1.21 km) dead-end stub along the Hudson waterfront below Dyckman Street was added in 2014. Technically, there is a ban on bicycles in Inwood Hill Park except for its western edge and the Henry Hudson Bridge. The Broadway Bridge is undergoing a multi-year rehabilitation, which will include the addition of protected bike lanes north of 218th St to the Bronx.

== Notable residents ==
Notable current and former residents of Inwood include:

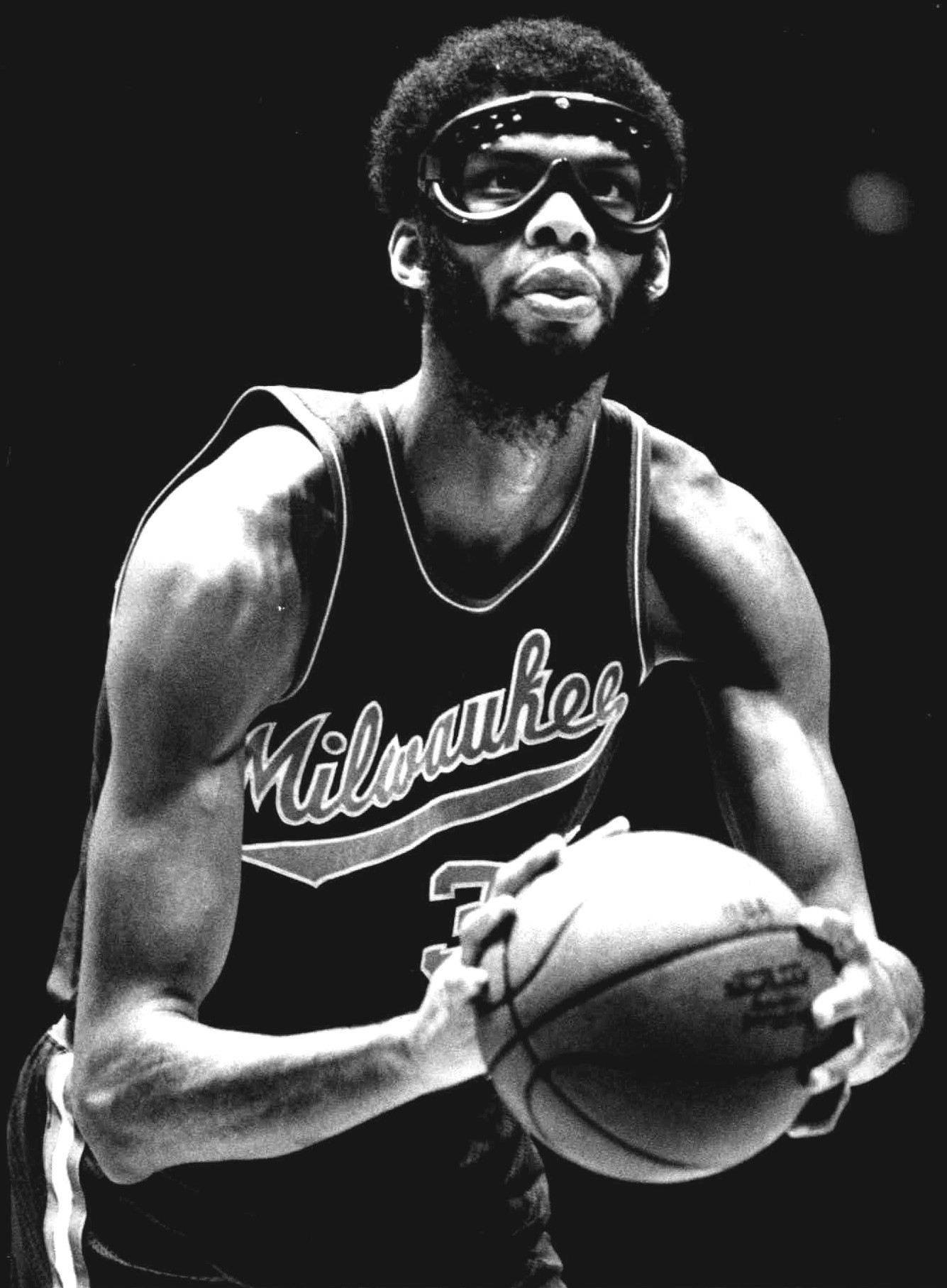
Kareem Abdul-Jabbar

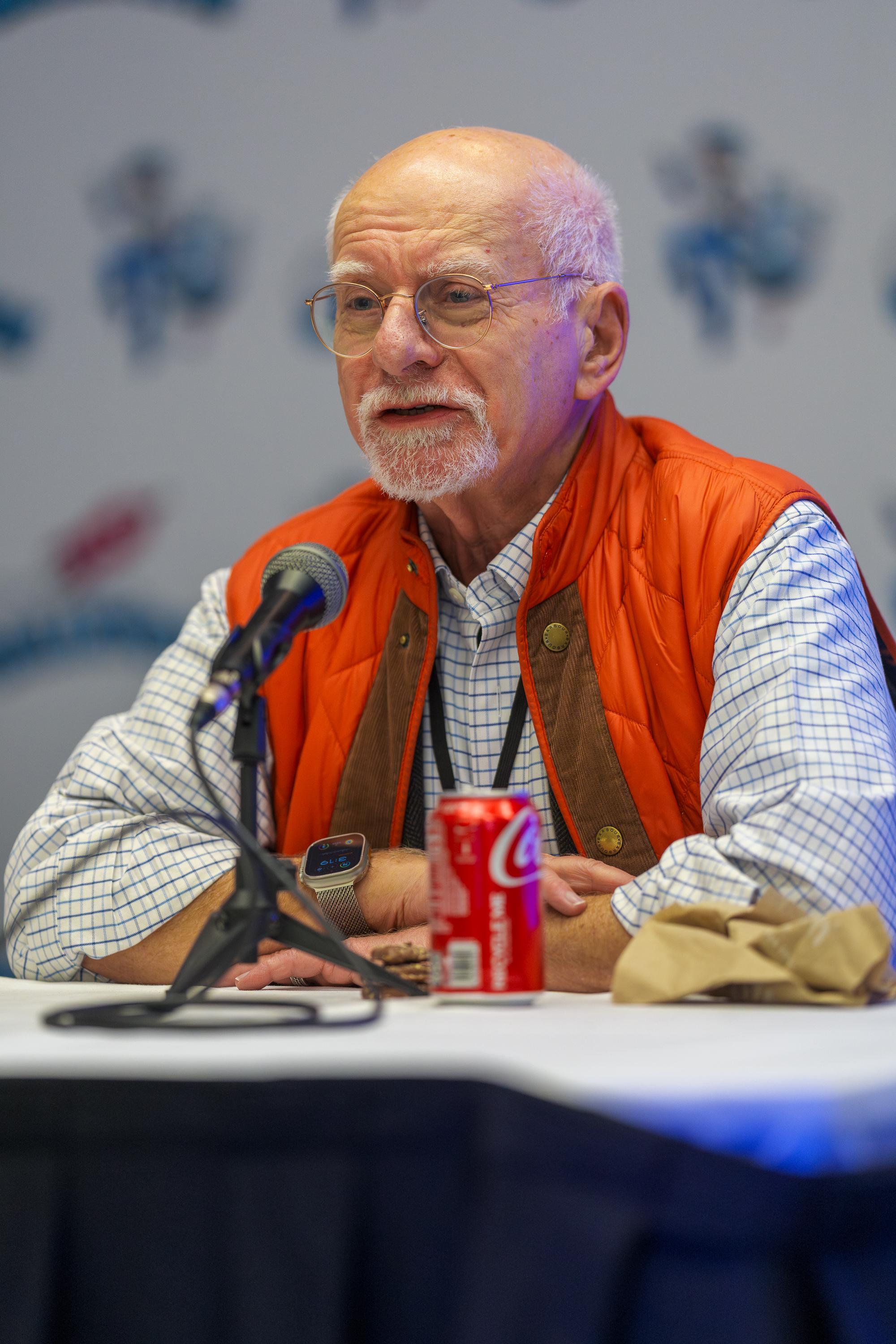
Chris Claremont

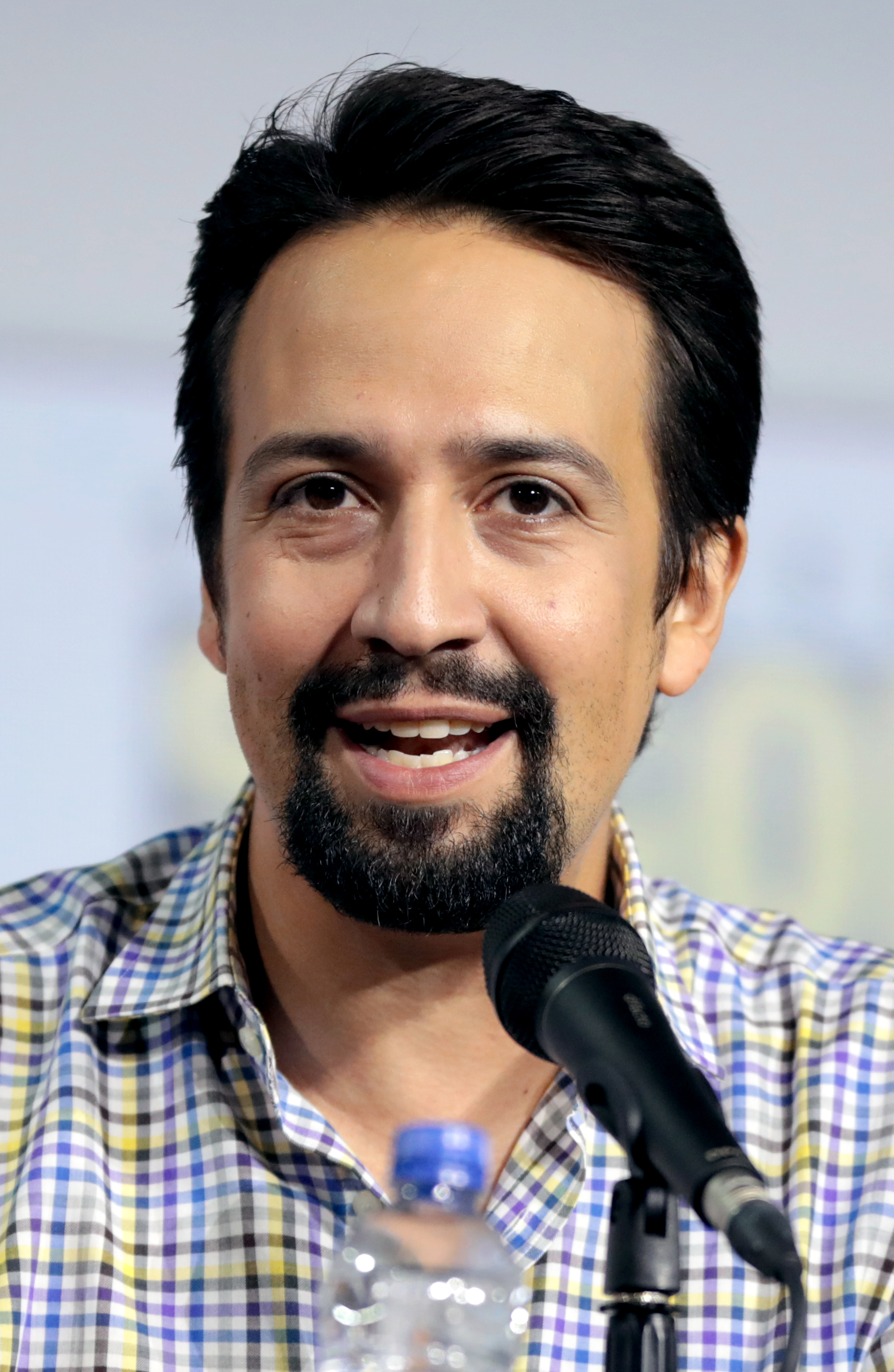
Lin-Manuel Miranda

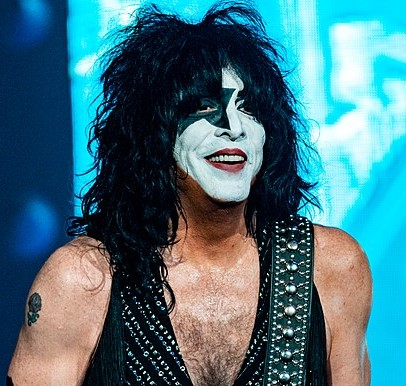
Paul Stanley

- Kareem Abdul-Jabbar (born 1947), former NBA basketball star, grew up in the Dyckman Houses as Lew Alcindor; a member of the Naismith Memorial Basketball Hall of Fame, 6x NBA Most Valuable Player, 19x NBA All-Star, 11x NBA All-Defensive Team.
- Grace Andreacchi (born 1954), novelist, poet, and playwright.
- Jim Carroll (1950–2009), author of The Basketball Diaries, an autobiography set in 1960s Inwood which was adapted into a film in 1995 starring Leonardo DiCaprio; poet and punk musician.
- Chris Claremont, comic book writer and novelist best known for 17-year run on Marvel's Uncanny X-Men
- Viña Delmar (born Alvina Louise Croter;1903–1990), short story writer, novelist, playwright, and screenwriter.
- Adriano Espaillat (born 1954), U.S. Congressman for Inwood since 2017.
- Morton Freedgood (1913–2006), author, wrote The Taking of Pelham One Two Three and other detective and mystery novels under the pen name John Godey
- Carole L. Glickfeld, novelist and short story writer.
- Jack Gore (born 2005), actor who is best known for his protagonist role as Timmy Cleary in ABC's sitcom The Kids Are Alright.
- Wynn Handman (1922–2020), artistic director and co-founder of The American Place Theatre.
- Bess Houdini (1876–1943; born Wilhelmina Beatrice Rahner), wife and stage assistant of magician and stunt performer Harry Houdini, lived at 67 Payson Avenue and conducted seances to contact him after his death.
- Jack Houghteling, novelist.
- JULIO 204, early graffiti writer and resident 204th Street, inspiration for TAKI 183
- Walter Koenig (born 1936), actor who played Pavel Chekov on Star Trek, also a writer, moved to Inwood as a young child and attended public school in the neighborhood.
- Cyril M. Kornbluth (1923–1958), science fiction author
- Brian Lehrer (born 1952), radio host on WNYC; winner of George Foster Peabody Award, New York Emmy Award, and Edward R. Murrow Award.
- Lionel Mapleson (1865–1937), violinist and librarian of the Metropolitan Opera House for nearly 50 years. Creator of the Mapleson Cylinders, one of the earliest recordings of live classical music. Mapleson lived on Park Terrace East at the time of his death.
- Anthony Marx (born 1959), president and CEO of the New York Public Library, 18th President of Amherst College.
- Lin-Manuel Miranda (born 1980), actor and writer of the Broadway musicals In the Heights and Hamilton.
- Paul Stanley (born 1952; born Stanley Bert Eisen), musician and co-founder of the American rock band Kiss, was born in Inwood and lived in the neighborhood until age 8; Inducted into the Rock and Roll Hall of Fame, received Kennedy Center Honors.
- Henry Stern (1935–2019), longtime Commissioner of the New York City Department of Parks and Recreation, member of the New York City Council .
- Isidor Straus (1845–1912), owner of Macy's department store, owned a country estate that was located in present-day Inwood Hill Park, served as member of the United States House of Representatives.
