= Dyckman Oval =

Sports venue in Manhattan, New York (1915–37)

Coordinates: 40.862377°N 73.921112°W

- Interactive map of Dyckman Oval
- Address: New York
- Capacity: 4,500 10,000 (expanded in 1930)
- Surface: Grass

Construction
- Closed: 1938

Tenants
- Cuban Stars East 1923-1929 New York Cubans 1935-1937 New York Black Yankees 1937

Dyckman Oval was a sports venue in the Inwood neighborhood of Upper Manhattan in New York City. It was most commonly known as a home for Negro league baseball, but was frequently used for other events, including boxing, cricket, wrestling, football, soccer, amateur baseball, and even ice skating competitions. It existed from about 1915 to 1937-1938.

The park was on a roughly triangular block bounded by Nagle Avenue and the elevated tracks of the subway's Broadway–Seventh Avenue Line (northwest, third base); 204th Street (northeast, left field); 10th Avenue (southeast, right field); and Academy Street (southwest, first base). The address of the park was sometimes given as Dyckman Street, farther to the southwest. The Dyckman Street station provided easy access to the park. The park was also about a mile south of Baker Field, the athletic fields for Columbia University. Most sources list Dyckman's seating capacity as around 4,500. Some sources say the capacity was later expanded to 10,000.

An early newspaper reference to the park appeared in the Brooklyn Standard Union for June 3, 1915, reporting on an amateur ball game between two local clubs.

As early as 1917, games played by the independent black team called the Cuban Stars were being advertised in local newspapers. The Stars joined the Eastern Colored League in 1923 and operated through 1928. They also played one year, 1929, in the American Negro League. They were then independent during the 1930s.

Games involving various Negro League teams were also staged there. A number of them were night games, as Dyckman Oval had acquired lights in 1930, several years before the major league New York area teams did.

The Cubans' owner, an entrepreneur named Alejandro Pompez, had a side business in the numbers racket. This eventually got him into legal trouble, and he had to abandon the team. The days of Dyckman Oval came to an end. The stands were demolished sometime during the off-season of 1937–1938. A writer for the New York Age in 1938 lamented having gone to the ballfield and finding it gone.

Very few photos of this park exist. One widely-circulated photo shows the outside of the main entrance at Nagle and Academy. The block is now mostly occupied by the Dyckman Cornerstone Community Center and its basketball courts. The Monsignor Kett Playground sits where the left field area once was.
