= 1844 United States presidential election in Tennessee =

- November 5, 1844
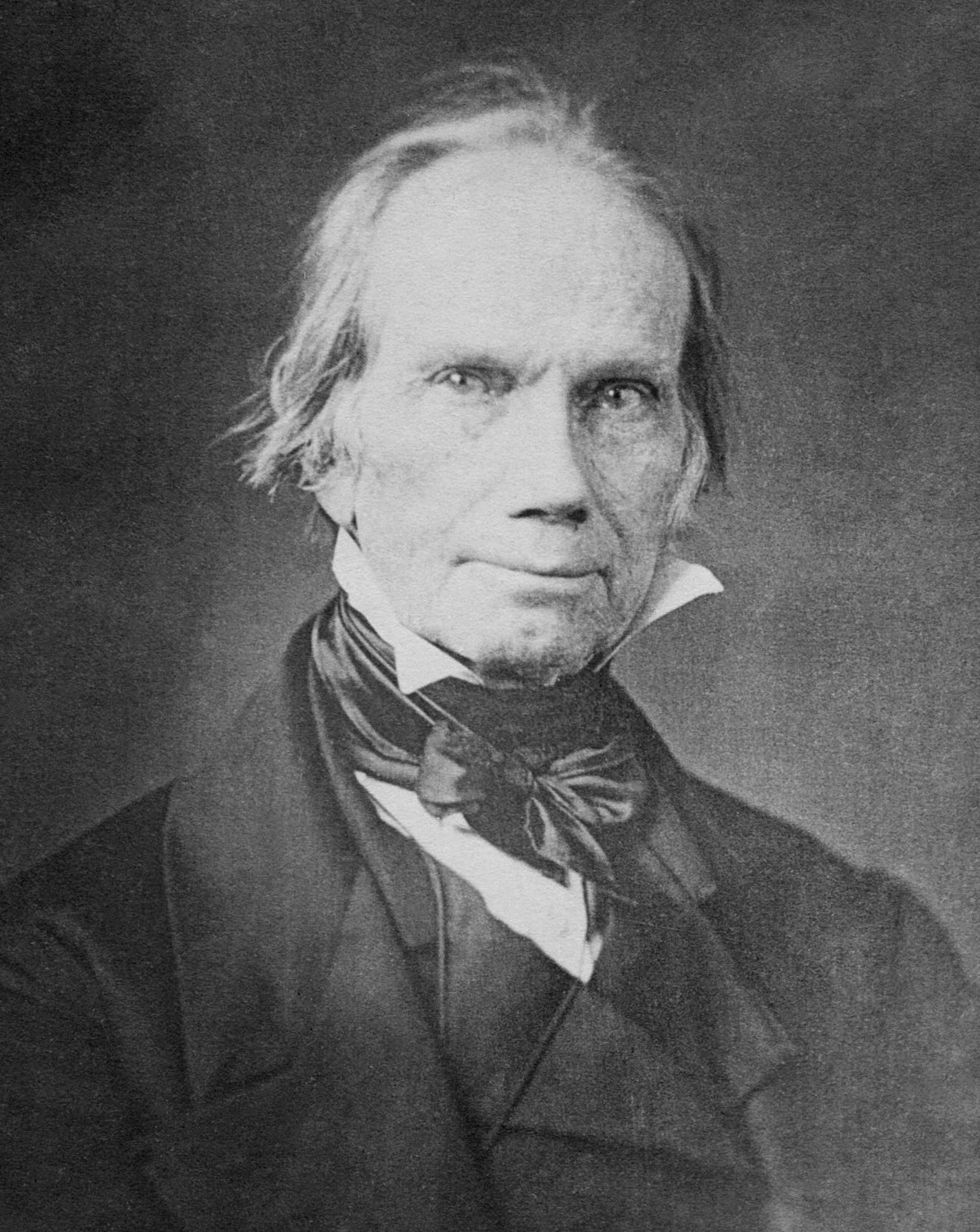

Nominee	Henry Clay	James K. Polk
Party	Whig	Democratic
Home state	Kentucky	Tennessee
Running mate	Theodore Frelinghuysen	George M. Dallas
Electoral vote	13	0
Popular vote	60,040	59,917
Percentage	50.05%	49.95%
County results
Clay
50–60%
60–70%
70–80%
80–90%
90–100%
Polk
50–60%
60–70%
70–80%
80–90%
Unknown/No vote
President before election
John Tyler
Independent
Elected President
James K. Polk
Democratic

The 1844 United States presidential election in Tennessee was held on November 5, 1844, as part of the 1844 United States presidential election. Voters chose 13 representatives, or electors to the Electoral College, who voted for President and Vice President.

Despite being Polk's home state and despite Polk previously serving as the state's governor, Tennessee voted for the Whig candidate, Henry Clay, albeit by a very narrow margin of 123 votes (0.10%), making it the closest state in the election.

James K. Polk is the first of 4 presidents to win the presidency while losing their home state. The others are Woodrow Wilson in 1916, Richard Nixon in 1968, and Donald Trump in 2016, and Polk is the only one of the four to do so without ever winning either their state of birth or residence in any presidential election.

This election marked the third time consecutively that Polk had lost a statewide election in Tennessee. The previous two were in the 1841 and 1843 gubernatorial elections.

== Conventions ==
Both James K. Polk and Henry Clay won their respective party conventions.

== Results ==
1844 United States presidential election in Tennessee
Party	Candidate	Running mate	Popular vote		Electoral vote	
Party	Candidate	Running mate	Count	%	Count	%
Whig	Henry Clay of Kentucky	Theodore Frelinghuysen of New York	60,040	50.05%	13	100.00%
Democratic	James K. Polk of Tennessee	George M. Dallas of Pennsylvania	59,917	49.95%	0	0.00%
Total			119,957	100.00%	13	100.00%

== See also ==
- 1844 United States elections
- United States presidential elections in Tennessee
