= 2016 United States presidential election in New York =

- November 8, 2016
- Turnout: 67.3% (▲8.1 pp)
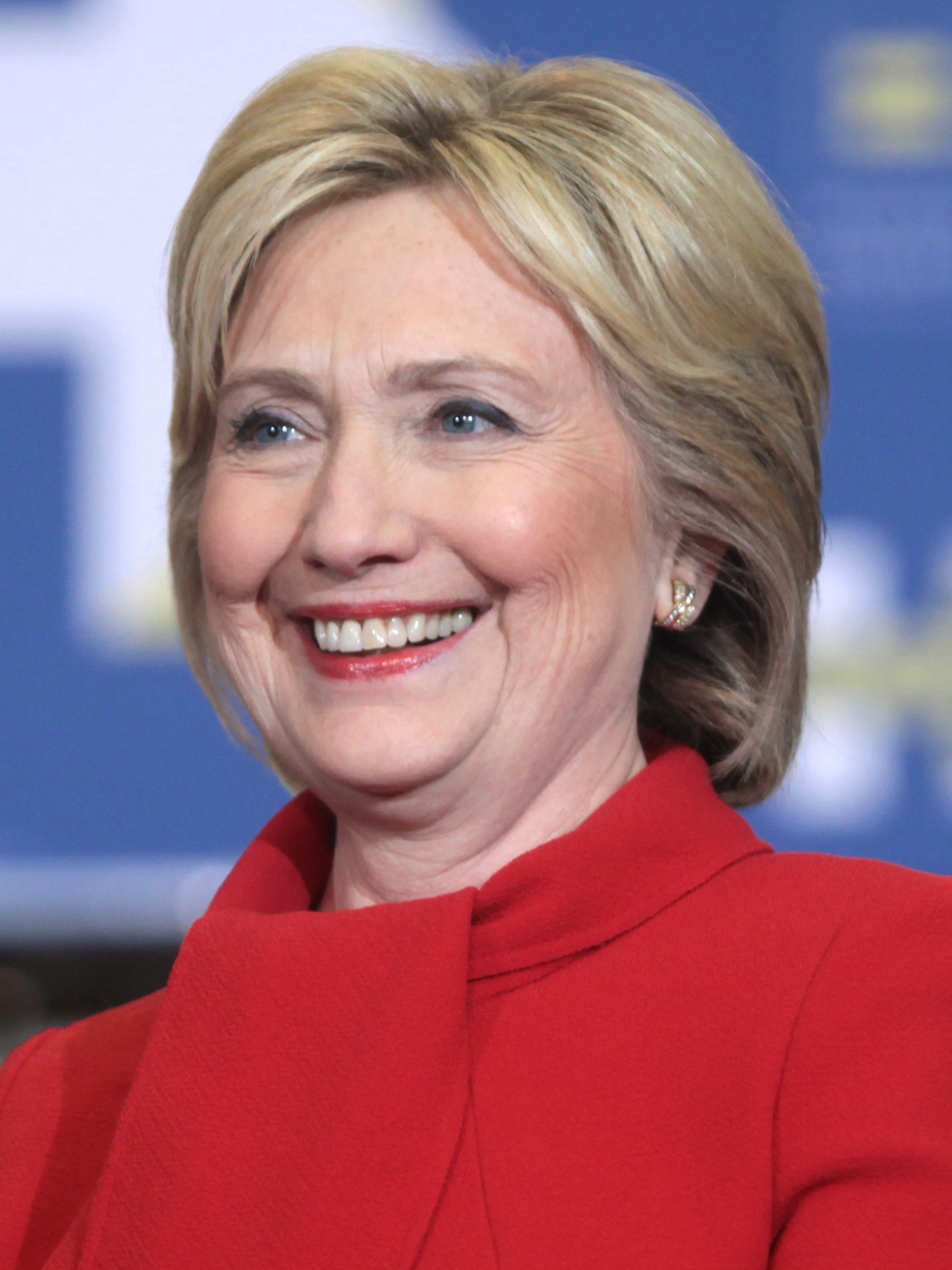

Nominee	Hillary Clinton	Donald Trump
Party	Democratic	Republican
Alliance	Parties: Women's Equality; Working Families	Conservative
Home state	New York	New York
Running mate	Tim Kaine	Mike Pence
Electoral vote	29	0
Popular vote	4,556,124	2,819,534
Percentage	59.38%	36.75%

Clinton
30–40%
40–50%
50–60%
60–70%
70–80%
80–90%
90–100%
Trump
40–50%
50–60%
60–70%
70–80%
80–90%
90–100%
Tie/No Data
President before election
Barack Obama
Democratic
Elected President
Donald Trump
Republican

The 2016 United States presidential election in New York was held on Tuesday, November 8, 2016, as part of the 2016 United States presidential election in which all 50 states plus the District of Columbia participated. New York voters chose electors to represent them in the Electoral College via a popular vote, pitting the Republican Party's nominee, businessman Donald Trump, and running mate Indiana Governor Mike Pence against Democratic Party nominee, former Secretary of State Hillary Clinton, and her running mate Virginia Senator Tim Kaine. New York has 29 electoral votes in the Electoral College.

Prior to the election, New York was considered to be a state that Clinton would win or a safe blue state. Despite Trump's association with the state, New York remained a Democratic stronghold with Clinton winning with 59.01% of the vote, while Trump received 36.52% of the vote, a 22.49% Democratic margin of victory. On Election Day, Clinton was immediately declared the winner of New York when polls closed based on exit polling alone.

Despite Clinton's landslide victory, Trump won more counties, taking 45 counties statewide compared to Clinton's 17. Trump also flipped 19 counties that had voted for Barack Obama in 2012, tied with Minnesota for the third-most counties flipped in any state; only Iowa and Wisconsin had more. Clinton received a smaller vote share than outgoing President Barack Obama had in 2012, while Trump improved on Mitt Romney's performance despite losing the state by a large margin.

New York was the home state of both major party nominees, though Clinton was born and raised in Chicago. Trump was born and raised in New York City and has been long associated with the state. Clinton has been a resident of Chappaqua in suburban Westchester County since 1999 and represented the state in the U.S. Senate from 2001 to 2009. Trump became the second consecutive major-party presidential nominee to lose his home state by over 20 points, after Mitt Romney, who lost his home state of Massachusetts by a similar margin in 2012. Before Romney, the last nominee this happened to was Herbert Hoover in his home state of California during 1932. Trump also became the fourth winning presidential candidate to lose his state of residence, after James K. Polk with Tennessee in 1844, Woodrow Wilson with New Jersey in 1916, and Richard Nixon with New York in 1968. Trump and Polk are the only ones to have lost their state of birth as well (also New York in Trump's case).

The election also marks the most recent cycle in which Trump would be on the presidential ballot as a legal resident of New York state; according to court filings, he registered Palm Beach, Florida, as his "primary residence" in 2019. This is the first time since 1956 in which New York voted more Republican than California, which has also occurred in every subsequent election.

== Primary elections ==
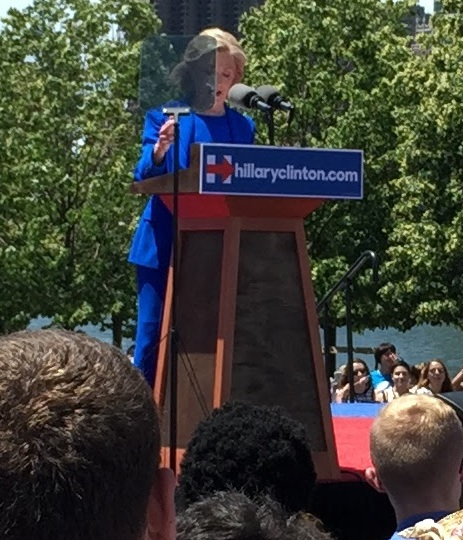
Hillary Clinton at her 2016 campaign kickoff on Roosevelt Island

On April 19, 2016, in the presidential primaries, New York voters expressed their preferences for the Democratic and Republican parties' respective nominees for president. Registered members of each party only voted in their party's primary, while voters who were unaffiliated with either party didn't vote in the primary.

=== Democratic primary ===
Two candidates appeared on the Democratic presidential primary ballot:

- Hillary Clinton
- Bernie Sanders

Similarly to the general election, both candidates in the Democratic primary had a connection to New York, as New York was Clinton's adopted home state and the birthplace of Sanders (who was running from neighboring Vermont).

New York Democratic primary, April 19, 2016
Candidate	Popular vote		Estimated delegates		
Candidate	Count	Percentage	Pledged	Unpledged	Total
Hillary Clinton	1,133,980	57.54%	139	41	180
Bernie Sanders	820,056	41.62%	108	0	108
Void	11,306	0.57%			
Blank votes	5,358	0.27%			
Uncommitted	—N/a		0	3	3
Total	1,970,900	100%	247	44	291

=== Republican primary ===
Three candidates appeared on the Republican presidential primary ballot:

- Ted Cruz
- John Kasich
- Donald Trump

New York Republican primary, April 19, 2016
Candidate	Votes	Percentage	Actual delegate count		
Candidate	Votes	Percentage	Bound	Unbound	Total
Donald Trump	554,522	59.21%	89	0	89
John Kasich	231,166	24.68%	6	0	6
Ted Cruz	136,083	14.53%	0	0	0
Blank & Void	14,756	1.58%	0	0	0
Unprojected delegates:			0	0	0
Total:	936,527	100.00%	95	0	95
Source: The Green Papers

== General election ==
=== Predictions ===
Source	Ranking	As of
Los Angeles Times	Safe D	November 6, 2016
CNN	Safe D	November 4, 2016
Cook Political Report	Safe D	November 7, 2016
Electoral-vote.com	Safe D	November 8, 2016
Rothenberg Political Report	Safe D	November 7, 2016
Sabato's Crystal Ball	Safe D	November 7, 2016
RealClearPolitics	Safe D	November 8, 2016
Fox News	Safe D	November 7, 2016

=== Polling ===
Polls projected New York to remain safely in the Democratic column for former Senator Hillary Clinton, despite it also being the home state of Donald Trump for his entire life. The last poll showed Hillary Clinton leading Trump 51% to 34%, and the average of the final 3 polls statewide showed Clinton leading Trump 52% to 31%, which was accurate compared to the results.

=== Debate ===
The first Presidential Debate took place at Hofstra University. Snap polls indicated that Clinton won.

=== Candidates ===
New York is a fusion state, which means that candidates are allowed to be on multiple lines. Those on the ballot were:

Democratic, Women's Equality and Working Families Parties

- Hillary Clinton / Tim Kaine

Conservative and Republican parties

- Donald Trump / Mike Pence

Green party

- Jill Stein / Ajamu Baraka

Independence and Libertarian parties

- Gary Johnson / Bill Weld

Gary Johnson and Bill Weld were nominated by the Libertarian and Independence Parties using separate elector slates. Their votes have been added together in the below table for convenience.

With the introduction of computerized voting, write-in candidates were permitted. The following is a certified list of persons who made valid presidential write in filings with the State Board of Elections

- Arantxa Aranja
- Neer R. Asherie
- Mark Blickley
- Robert L. Buchanan
- Gary S. Canns
- Willie Carter
- Darrell Castle
- Ariel T. Cohen
- William J. Connolly
- Rocky De La Fuente
- Jason Fried
- Zoltan Istvan Gyurko
- Ben Hartnell
- Tom Hoefling
- Michael Frederick Ingbar
- Lynn Kahn
- Chris Keniston
- Gloria La Riva
- Jeffrey Mackler
- Mike Maturen
- Evan McMullin
- Monica Moorehead
- Jason Mutford
- Clifton Roberts
- Marshall Schoenke
- Ryan Alan Scott
- Emidio Soltysik
- Tony Valdivia
- J. J. Vogel-Walcutt
- Esther Welsh
- Barbara Whitaker
- Robert M. Wolff

According to The New York Times, only 300 write-in votes were counted in 2012, while 63,239 were recorded as "Blank, Void or Scattering".

=== Results ===
2016 United States presidential election in New York
Party	Candidate	Running mate	Votes	Percentage	Electoral votes
Democratic	Hillary Clinton	Tim Kaine	4,379,783	56.08%	
Working Families	Hillary Clinton	Tim Kaine	140,043	1.83%	
Women's Equality	Hillary Clinton	Tim Kaine	36,292	0.47%	
Total	Hillary Clinton	Tim Kaine	4,556,118	59.38%	29
Republican	Donald Trump	Mike Pence	2,527,141	32.94%	
Conservative	Donald Trump	Mike Pence	292,392	3.81%	
Total	Donald Trump	Mike Pence	2,819,533	36.75%	0
Independence	Gary Johnson	Bill Weld	119,160	1.55%	0
Libertarian	Gary Johnson	Bill Weld	57,438	0.75%	0
Total	Gary Johnson	Bill Weld	176,598	2.30%	
Green	Jill Stein	Ajamu Baraka	107,935	1.41%	0
Official write-in	Evan McMullin	Mindy Finn	10,397	0.14%	0
Official write-in	Others	Others	2,518	0.03%	0
Totals			7,673,099	100.00%	29

==== New York City results ====
2016 Presidential Election in New York City		Manhattan	The Bronx	Brooklyn	Queens	Staten Island	Total	
Democratic- Working Families- Women's Equality	Hillary Clinton	579,013	353,646	640,553	517,220	78,143	2,159,575	78.99%
Democratic- Working Families- Women's Equality	Hillary Clinton	86.6%	88.5%	79.5%	75.4%	41.0%	2,159,575	78.99%
Republican- Conservative	Donald Trump	64,930	37,797	141,044	149,341	101,437	494,549	18.1%
Republican- Conservative	Donald Trump	9.7%	9.5%	17.5%	21.8%	56.1%	494,549	18.1%
Others	Others	24,997	8,079	24,008	19,832	5,380	82,296	3.0%
Others	Others	3.7%	2.0%	3.0%	2.9%	3.0%	82,296	3.0%
TOTAL		668,940	399,522	805,605	686,393	184,960	2,736,420	100.00%

==== By New York City Council district ====
Clinton won 47 of 51 New York City Council districts, including one held by a Republican, while Trump won 4 of 51 city council districts, including two held by Democrats.

New York City Council district results

District	Clinton	Trump	City-Council Member
1st	83.3%	12.6%	Margaret Chin
2nd	86.6%	9.3%	Rosie Méndez
3rd	87.1%	9.0%	Corey Johnson
4th	78.1%	17.5%	Daniel Garodnick
5th	80.1%	15.5%	Ben Kallos
6th	87.2%	9.0%	Helen Rosenthal
7th	91.9%	4.8%	Mark Levine
8th	92.8%	5.0%	Melissa Mark-Viverito
9th	94.6%	2.7%	Inez Dickens
10th	89.8%	7.1%	Ydanis Rodriguez
11th	81.5%	15.1%	Andrew Cohen
12th	94.1%	4.3%	Andy King
13th	66.6%	30.5%	James Vacca
14th	93.0%	5.3%	Fernando Cabrera
15th	92.1%	6.1%	Ritchie Torres
16th	94.8%	3.9%	Vanessa Gibson
17th	93.5%	4.8%	Rafael Salamanca
18th	91.6%	6.6%	Annabel Palma
19th	54.6%	41.9%	Paul Vallone
20th	69.0%	28.1%	Peter Koo
21st	87.3%	10.5%	Julissa Ferreras
22nd	77.3%	18.5%	Costa Constantinides
23rd	71.0%	26.2%	Barry Grodenchik
24th	72.3%	24.7%	Rory Lancman
25th	80.0%	17.0%	Daniel Dromm
26th	82.1%	14.4%	Jimmy Van Bramer
27th	94.8%	3.7%	Daneek Miller
28th	91.2%	7.4%	Adrienne Adams
29th	68.8%	27.4%	Karen Koslowitz
30th	56.4%	39.9%	Elizabeth Crowley
31st	89.1%	9.0%	Donovan Richards
32nd	59.6%	37.6%	Eric Ulrich
33rd	85.6%	10.4%	Stephen Levin
34th	89.1%	7.2%	Antonio Reynoso
35th	91.6%	5.3%	Laurie Cumbo
36th	95.1%	1.9%	Robert Cornegy
37th	91.8%	5.5%	Rafael Espinal
38th	79.7%	16.8%	Carlos Menchaca
39th	85.0%	11.4%	Brad Lander
40th	91.9%	5.3%	Mathieu Eugene
41st	95.6%	2.7%	Darlene Mealy
42nd	95.2%	3.5%	Inez Barron
43rd	54.7%	40.9%	Vincent J. Gentile
44th	31.4%	64.5%	David G. Greenfield
45th	84.2%	13.6%	Jumaane Williams
46th	75.0%	22.8%	Alan Maisel
47th	54.2%	43.0%	Mark Treyger
48th	38.8%	58.1%	Chaim Deutsch
49th	67.1%	29.6%	Debi Rose
50th	34.9%	62.0%	Steven Matteo
51st	25.5%	71.9%	Joe Borelli

Treemap of the popular vote by county

==== By county ====
County	Hillary Clinton Democratic		Donald Trump Republican		Various candidates Other parties		Margin		Total votes cast
County	#	%	#	%	#	%	#	%	Total votes cast
Albany	83,071	59.41%	47,808	34.19%	8,939	6.40%	35,263	25.22%	139,818
Allegany	4,882	26.12%	12,525	67.01%	1,285	6.87%	-7,643	-40.89%	18,692
Bronx	353,646	88.52%	37,797	9.46%	8,079	2.02%	315,849	79.06%	399,522
Broome	39,212	45.56%	40,943	47.57%	5,917	6.87%	-1,731	-2.01%	86,072
Cattaraugus	9,497	30.48%	19,692	63.19%	1,972	6.33%	-10,195	-32.71%	31,161
Cayuga	13,522	40.76%	17,384	52.41%	2,266	6.83%	-3,862	-11.65%	33,172
Chautauqua	19,091	35.20%	31,594	58.25%	3,549	6.55%	-12,503	-23.05%	54,234
Chemung	13,757	38.09%	20,097	55.64%	2,265	6.27%	-6,340	-17.55%	36,119
Chenango	6,775	33.61%	11,921	59.13%	1,464	7.26%	-5,146	-25.52%	20,160
Clinton	15,059	46.91%	14,449	45.01%	2,597	8.08%	610	1.90%	32,105
Columbia	15,284	49.46%	13,756	44.51%	1,862	6.03%	1,528	4.95%	30,902
Cortland	8,771	43.33%	9,900	48.90%	1,573	7.77%	-1,129	-5.57%	20,244
Delaware	6,627	33.48%	11,942	60.34%	1,223	6.18%	-5,315	-26.86%	19,792
Dutchess	62,285	47.54%	61,821	47.19%	6,912	5.27%	464	0.35%	131,018
Erie	215,456	50.86%	188,303	44.45%	19,866	4.69%	27,153	6.41%	423,625
Essex	7,762	45.08%	7,958	46.22%	1,498	8.70%	-196	-1.14%	17,218
Franklin	7,297	43.05%	8,221	48.50%	1,434	8.45%	-924	-5.45%	16,952
Fulton	6,496	30.62%	13,462	63.46%	1,256	5.92%	-6,966	-32.84%	21,214
Genesee	7,650	28.94%	16,915	63.99%	1,867	7.07%	-9,265	-35.05%	26,432
Greene	7,405	33.58%	13,073	59.29%	1,572	7.13%	-5,668	-25.71%	22,050
Hamilton	949	29.43%	2,064	64.00%	212	6.57%	-1,115	-34.57%	3,225
Herkimer	8,083	30.79%	16,699	63.60%	1,473	5.61%	-8,616	-32.81%	26,255
Jefferson	13,809	36.12%	21,763	56.92%	2,664	6.96%	-7,954	-20.80%	38,236
Kings	640,553	79.51%	141,044	17.51%	24,008	2.98%	499,509	62.00%	805,605
Lewis	3,146	27.78%	7,400	65.34%	779	6.88%	-4,254	-37.56%	11,325
Livingston	10,697	35.62%	17,290	57.57%	2,044	6.81%	-6,593	-21.95%	30,031
Madison	11,667	38.81%	15,936	53.01%	2,461	8.18%	-4,269	-14.20%	30,064
Monroe	188,592	54.23%	136,582	39.27%	22,616	6.50%	52,010	14.94%	347,790
Montgomery	6,595	34.61%	11,301	59.31%	1,158	6.08%	-4,706	-24.70%	19,054
Nassau	332,154	51.33%	292,025	45.13%	22,943	3.54%	40,129	6.20%	647,122
New York	579,013	86.56%	64,930	9.71%	24,997	3.73%	514,083	76.85%	668,940
Niagara	35,559	38.48%	51,961	56.23%	4,882	5.29%	-16,402	-17.75%	92,402
Oneida	33,743	37.08%	51,437	56.52%	5,829	6.40%	-17,694	-19.44%	91,009
Onondaga	112,337	53.89%	83,649	40.13%	12,454	5.98%	28,688	13.76%	208,440
Ontario	22,233	42.33%	26,029	49.55%	4,265	8.12%	-3,796	-7.22%	52,527
Orange	68,278	44.91%	76,645	50.42%	7,098	4.67%	-8,367	-5.51%	152,021
Orleans	4,470	27.29%	10,936	66.76%	974	5.95%	-6,466	-39.47%	16,380
Oswego	17,095	35.48%	27,688	57.47%	3,397	7.05%	-10,593	-21.99%	48,180
Otsego	10,451	40.72%	13,308	51.85%	1,909	7.43%	-2,857	-11.13%	25,668
Putnam	19,366	39.88%	27,024	55.65%	2,173	4.47%	-7,658	-15.77%	48,563
Queens	517,220	75.35%	149,341	21.76%	19,832	2.89%	367,879	53.59%	686,393
Rensselaer	32,717	45.72%	33,726	47.13%	5,119	7.15%	-1,009	-1.41%	71,562
Richmond	74,143	40.97%	101,437	56.05%	5,380	2.98%	-27,294	-15.08%	180,960
Rockland	69,342	51.33%	60,911	45.09%	4,834	3.58%	8,431	6.24%	135,087
Saratoga	50,913	44.62%	54,575	47.83%	8,606	7.55%	-3,662	-3.21%	114,094
Schenectady	33,747	50.16%	28,953	43.03%	4,580	6.81%	4,794	7.13%	67,280
Schoharie	4,240	30.18%	8,831	62.85%	979	6.97%	-4,591	-32.67%	14,050
Schuyler	3,091	35.24%	5,050	57.57%	631	7.19%	-1,959	-22.33%	8,772
Seneca	5,697	40.75%	7,236	51.76%	1,047	7.49%	-1,539	-11.01%	13,980
St. Lawrence	16,488	42.11%	19,942	50.93%	2,728	6.96%	-3,454	-8.82%	39,158
Steuben	12,526	29.82%	26,831	63.88%	2,645	6.30%	-14,305	-34.06%	42,002
Suffolk	303,951	44.62%	350,570	51.46%	26,733	3.92%	-46,619	-6.84%	681,254
Sullivan	12,568	41.96%	15,931	53.18%	1,456	4.86%	-3,363	-11.22%	29,955
Tioga	7,526	33.75%	13,260	59.46%	1,513	6.79%	-5,734	-25.71%	22,299
Tompkins	28,890	67.69%	10,371	24.30%	3,417	8.01%	18,519	43.39%	42,678
Ulster	44,597	52.29%	35,239	41.32%	5,454	6.39%	9,358	10.97%	85,290
Warren	13,091	41.68%	15,751	50.15%	2,566	8.17%	-2,660	-8.47%	31,408
Washington	9,098	37.09%	13,610	55.49%	1,820	7.42%	-4,512	-18.40%	24,528
Wayne	13,473	33.95%	23,380	58.91%	2,834	7.14%	-9,907	-24.96%	39,687
Westchester	272,926	64.88%	131,238	31.20%	16,491	3.92%	141,688	33.68%	420,655
Wyoming	3,904	22.57%	12,442	71.93%	952	5.50%	-8,538	-49.36%	17,298
Yates	3,659	36.35%	5,660	56.23%	747	7.42%	-2,001	-19.88%	10,066
Totals	4,556,142	59.00%	2,819,557	36.51%	346,096	4.49%	1,736,585	22.49%	7,721,795

Counties that flipped from Democratic to Republican

- Broome (County Seat: Binghamton)
- Cayuga (County Seat: Auburn)
- Cortland (County Seat: Cortland)
- Essex (County Seat: Elizabethtown)
- Franklin (County Seat: Malone)
- Madison (County Seat: Wampsville)
- Niagara (County Seat: Lockport)
- Orange (County Seat: Goshen)
- Oswego (County Seat: Waterloo)
- Otsego (County Seat: Cooperstown)
- Rensselaer (County Seat: Troy)
- Richmond (coterminous with Staten Island, a borough of New York City)
- Saratoga (County Seat: Ballston Spa)
- Seneca (County Seat: Waterloo)
- St. Lawrence (County Seat: Canton)
- Suffolk (County Seat: Riverhead)
- Sullivan (County Seat: Monticello)
- Warren (County Seat: Queensbury)
- Washington (County Seat: Hudson Falls)

==== By congressional district ====
Clinton won 18 of 27 congressional districts. Both Trump and Clinton won a district held by the other party.

District	Clinton	Trump	Representative
1st	42%	54%	Lee Zeldin
2nd	44%	53%	Peter T. King
3rd	51%	45%	Steve Israel
3rd	51%	45%	Thomas Suozzi
4th	53%	43%	Kathleen Rice
5th	85%	13%	Gregory Meeks
6th	65%	32%	Grace Meng
7th	86%	10%	Nydia Velázquez
8th	84%	13%	Hakeem Jeffries
9th	83%	14%	Yvette Clarke
10th	77%	19%	Jerry Nadler
11th	44%	53%	Dan Donovan
12th	82%	13%	Carolyn Maloney
13th	92%	5%	Charles B. Rangel
13th	92%	5%	Adriano Espaillat
14th	77%	20%	Joe Crowley
15th	94%	5%	Jose Serrano
16th	75%	22%	Eliot Engel
17th	58%	38%	Nita Lowey
18th	47%	49%	Sean Patrick Maloney
19th	44%	50%	John Faso
20th	53%	40%	Paul Tonko
21st	39%	53%	Elise Stefanik
22nd	39%	54%	Richard L. Hanna
22nd	39%	54%	Claudia Tenney
23rd	39%	54%	Tom Reed
24th	49%	45%	John Katko
25th	55%	39%	Louise Slaughter
26th	57%	38%	Brian Higgins
27th	35%	59%	Chris Collins

== Analysis ==
Reflecting a strong nationwide trend of rural areas swinging hard against Clinton, Trump improved greatly upon recent Republican performances in rural Upstate New York. Upstate New York was historically a staunchly Republican region, although it had been trending Democratic since the 1990s, and Democrat Barack Obama had twice performed very strongly across both urban and rural upstate in the preceding two elections. Trump won 19 counties in New York State that voted for President Obama in 2012, 17 of which were rural upstate counties. Clinton won Upstate New York's traditionally Democratic cities and held onto the urban counties upstate. However, Trump also made gains in urban parts of upstate, which had long been in economic decline, due to his strength in economically distressed areas and his appeal to working-class whites who traditionally vote Democratic. Trump's message on trade policy and pledge to halt job outsourcing appealed strongly to the Rust Belt region of the United States, where many local economies had been ravaged by the loss of industrial jobs, which extends into Upstate New York cities like Binghamton, Buffalo, Rochester, and Syracuse.

In Erie County, where Buffalo is located in Western New York bordering the Great Lakes, Clinton won only 51-44 compared with Obama's 57–41 victory in 2012. Clinton suffered her strongest swings against her in traditionally Democratic Northern New York along the Saint Lawrence River. The only upstate county where Clinton won by a stronger margin than Obama had in 2012 was the liberal Democratic stronghold of Tompkins County, home to the college town of Ithaca where Cornell University is located. Clinton and Obama both received 68% in the county, but Trump's unpopularity with young people and students led him to fall to only 24% of the vote compared with 28% for Romney. Hillary Clinton's landslide statewide win was powered by an overwhelmingly lopsided victory in the massively populated five boroughs of New York City, the largest city in the United States, despite Donald Trump's longtime popular cultural association with the city. In New York City, Hillary Clinton received 2,164,575 votes (79.0% of the vote) compared with only 494,549 votes (18.0% of the vote) for Donald Trump. This represented a slight fall from Barack Obama's historic 81.2% in the city in 2012, and the borough of Staten Island flipped from Obama to Trump. However, Trump's percentage was virtually unchanged from Romney's 17.8%. With huge victories in the other four boroughs, Clinton's 60.9% victory margin over Trump was a slight decrease from Obama's record 63.4% margin over Romney, making Clinton's win the second-widest victory margin for a presidential candidate in New York City history.

Trump's birthplace borough of Queens gave Clinton over 75% of the vote and less than 22% to Trump. In Manhattan, home to Trump Tower, Trump's famous landmark residence, Clinton received nearly 87% while Trump received less than 10% of the vote, the worst performance ever for a major party presidential candidate in Manhattan. This made Trump's home borough one of only 3 counties in the state where Trump did worse than Mitt Romney had in 2012, along with Westchester and Tompkins counties. In the populated suburbs around New York City, Hillary Clinton won overall, although, with the sole exception of her county of residence, there were strong swings against her compared with President Obama's performance. The downstate suburban counties around the city were historically Republican bastions, until Hillary's husband Bill Clinton made dramatic suburban gains for Democrats in the 1990s and easily swept every suburban New York county in his 1996 re-election campaign. North of the city, Clinton significantly further improved on Barack Obama's landslide margin in wealthy Westchester County, where the Clintons own their primary residence in Chappaqua, New York. Clinton won Westchester County 65-31 compared with Obama's 62–37 victory over Mitt Romney. Conversely, Trump made major gains on Long Island, as Clinton won Nassau County by only a slightly reduced 6-point margin rather than the 8-point margin by which Obama had won it, while Suffolk County saw an even bigger swing, going from a 4-point win for Obama to a 7-point win for Trump, the first Republican victory in the county since 1992. Broome and Niagara counties voted Republican for the first time since 1984, while Rensselaer, Franklin, and St. Lawrence counties did so for the first time since 1988.

While heavily Democratic New York City had secured consistent Democratic landslides in New York State for 3 decades, since 1992 every Democratic presidential candidate would have still carried New York State even without the massive Democratic vote margins provided by the 5 boroughs, albeit by substantially closer margins. In 2012, Obama won New York State outside of New York City with 54.03% of the vote compared with Mitt Romney's 44.54%. With Donald Trump having made major gains over Romney's performance across Upstate New York and improving overall in suburban downstate, Hillary Clinton was heavily dependent on New York City for her victory; her margin of 1,724,416 votes in the five boroughs accounted for almost all of her statewide majority. Clinton did manage to continue the Democratic winning streak in New York State outside of New York City, albeit just barely. Removing the 5 boroughs of New York City from the result, Clinton received 2,391,549 votes while Trump received 2,324,985 votes, meaning Clinton would have won New York State without the city by 66,564 votes, a margin of 1.4% out of all statewide votes cast outside of the city. However, when removing the ten counties in the state that are part of the New York metropolitan area (The Boroughs, Long Island, and Putnam, Rockland, and Westchester Counties), Trump became the first Republican to carry Upstate since George H. W. Bush did so in 1988, obtaining 1,463,217 votes in the state's other 52 counties compared to Clinton's 1,393,810 votes, a margin of 69,407 votes, though George W. Bush came within 8,056 votes of John Kerry in Upstate during the 2004 election. The 2016 United States Senate election in New York held on the same day turned notably different. While Clinton only carried 12 upstate counties, Chuck Schumer won all counties in New York state except 5 and captured over 70% of the vote. As of the 2024 United States presidential election, this is the most recent presidential election where the following counties voted Republican: Broome, Essex, Rensselaer, and Saratoga.

== See also ==
- United States presidential elections in New York
- First presidency of Donald Trump
- 2016 Democratic Party presidential debates and forums
- 2016 Democratic Party presidential primaries
- 2016 Republican Party presidential debates and forums
- 2016 Republican Party presidential primaries
