= 1843 Tennessee gubernatorial election =

- August 3, 1843
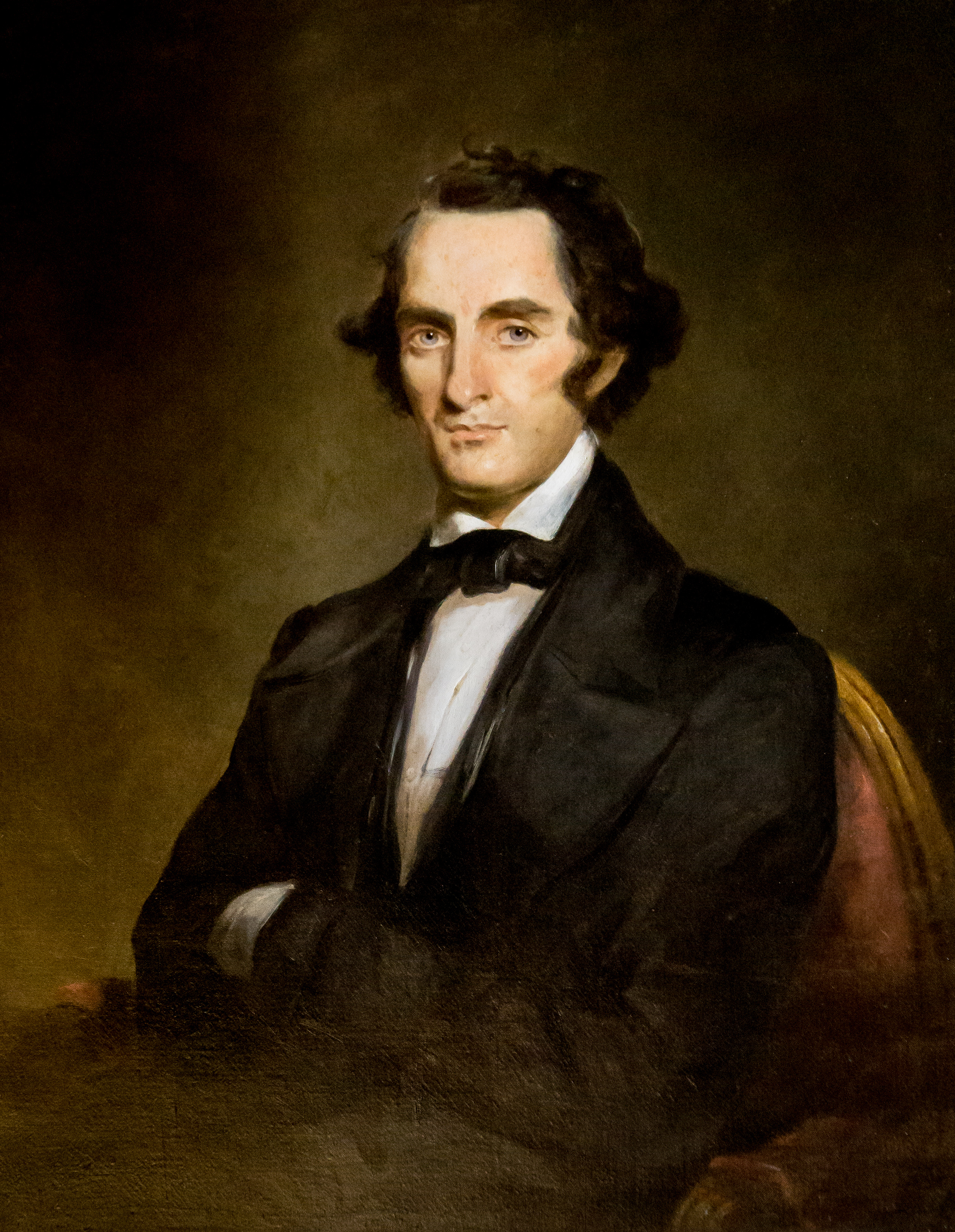

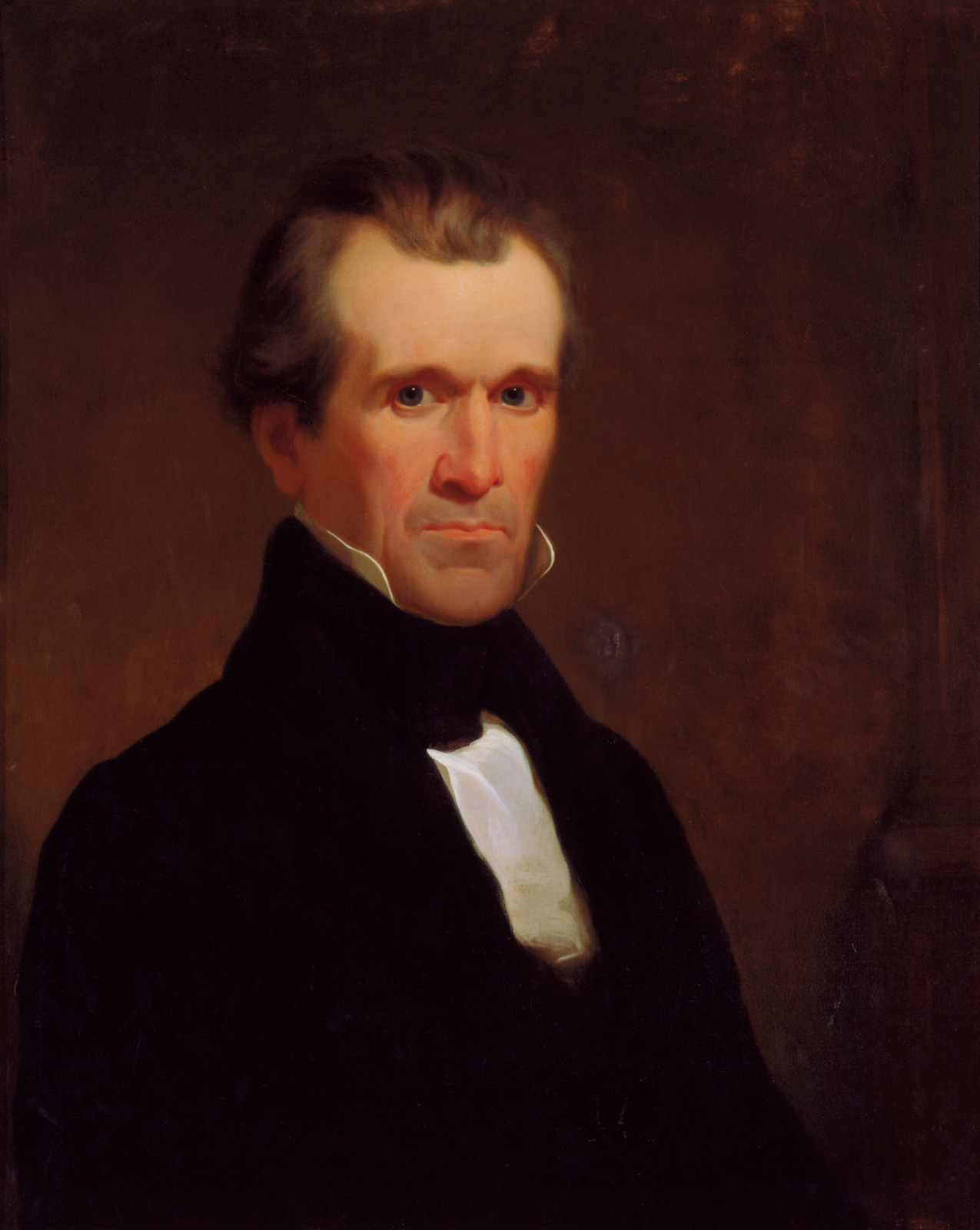
Nominee	James C. Jones	James K. Polk
Party	Whig	Democratic
Popular vote	58,307	54,470
Percentage	51.70%	48.30%
- County results Jones: 50–60% 60–70% 70–80% 80–90% >90% Polk: 50–60% 60–70% 70–80% 70–80% 80–90% No data/No votes
Governor before election
James C. Jones
Whig
Elected Governor
James C. Jones
Whig

The 1843 Tennessee gubernatorial election was held on August 3, 1843, to elect the governor of Tennessee. Incumbent Whig governor James C. Jones won re-election against Democratic nominee and former governor James K. Polk in a rematch of the previous election.

== Background ==
Following the election of 1841, Whigs controlled the state House of Representatives, but Democrats held onto the state senate by a 13 to 12 margin. One of the first tasks of the new government was to fill the U.S. Senate seats left vacant by the resignations of Alexander O. Anderson and Alfred O. P. Nicholson. Democrats demanded one of the two seats go to a Democrat, a request the Whigs rejected. The 13 Democrats in the state senate, who became known as the "Immortal Thirteen," refused to allow a joint session of the legislature (where Whigs, who controlled the House, would have a numerical majority) to choose the replacement senators, and Tennessee thus had no representation in the U.S. Senate for most of 1842 and 1843. Though the government was mostly gridlocked by the Immortal Thirteen during Jones's first term, it did manage to enact debt reform legislation in 1842.

In the election of 1843, Democratic Governor James K. Polk canvassed the state extensively in hopes of taking back the governor's office, but he was again unsuccessful. Furthermore, Whigs gained control of the state senate, ending the "Immortal Thirteen" gridlock, and two Whigs were appointed to the state's U.S. Senate seats.

== General election ==
On election day, August 3, 1843, incumbent Whig governor James C. Jones won re-election by a margin of 5,189 votes against his opponent Democratic nominee and former governor James K. Polk, thereby retaining Whig control over the office of governor. Jones was sworn in for his second term on October 15, 1843.

=== Results ===
Tennessee gubernatorial election, 1843
Party	Candidate	Votes	%
Whig	James C. Jones (incumbent)	58,307	51.70%
Democratic	James K. Polk	54,470	48.30%
Total votes		112,777	100.00%
Whig hold			
