= Shaun Abreu =

American politician (born 1991)

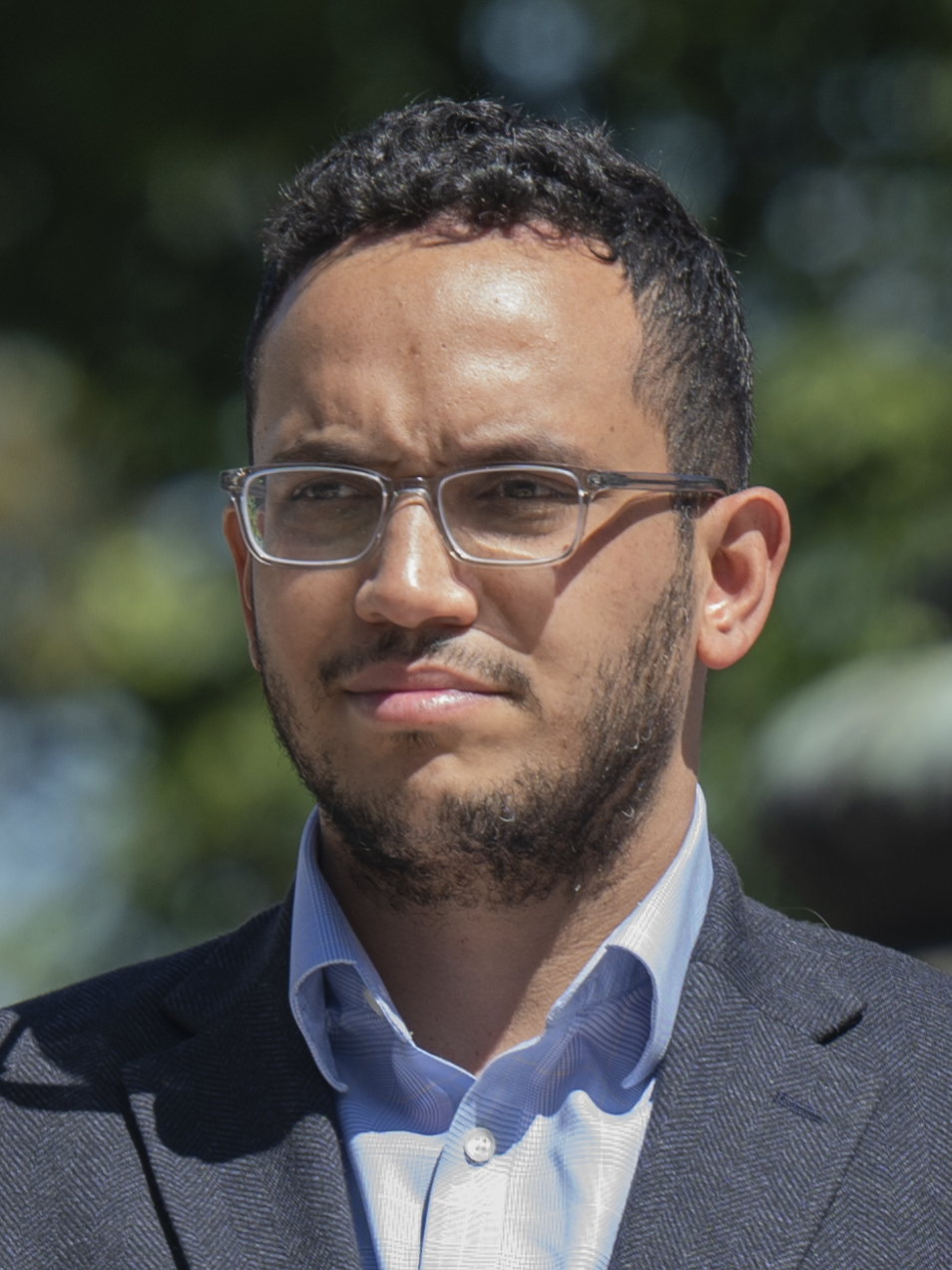
- Abreu in 2025

Majority Leader of the New York City Council
- Incumbent
- Assumed office January 15, 2026
- Preceded by: Amanda Farias

Member of the New York City Council from the 7th district
- Incumbent
- Assumed office January 1, 2022
- Preceded by: Mark Levine

Personal details
- Born: January 8, 1991 (age 35) New York City, New York, U.S.
- Party: Democratic
- Education: Columbia University (BA); Tulane University (JD)
- Website: Official website Campaign website

Shaun Abreu (born January 8, 1991) is an American politician and attorney from New York City. He is a member of the Democratic Party serving as the city councilman for the 7th district of the New York City Council.

== Early life and education ==
Abreu was born in Washington Heights, Manhattan, the son of immigrants from the Dominican Republic. At nine years old, his family was evicted from their home, forcing them to stay with neighbors. His mother is a clerk at Zabar's, and his father is a union member and a janitor at the Port Authority Bus Terminal.

Abreu graduated from George Washington High School in Washington Heights, and went on to receive a degree in political science and government from Columbia University and a J.D. degree from Tulane University Law School. After graduating law school in 2018, he became an attorney with Genova Burns, LLC, a law firm that primary represents employers in labor disputes. In August 2020, shortly before announcing his run for City Council, he became a tenant's rights lawyer with the New York Legal Assistance Group.

While still a student at Columbia, Abreu worked as Mark Levine's deputy campaign manager during Levine's successful 2013 campaign for the New York City Council. He also served as a member of Manhattan Community Board 9 and as board director for Friends of Morningside Park.

== Career ==
=== New York City Council ===
==== Elections ====
===== 2021 Election Cycle =====
In November 2020, Abreu announced his 2021 campaign to succeed the term-limited Levine in the City Council's 7th district, which covers Morningside Heights, Manhattan Valley, Hamilton Heights, and parts of the Upper West Side, Harlem and Washington Heights. Garnering endorsements from Levine, U.S. Congressman Adriano Espaillat, and most of the city's major unions, Abreu was regarded as the frontrunner in the race. Abreu endorsed Eric Adams in the 2021 mayoral primary.

Five of Abreu's eleven opponents – Maria Ordoñez, Stacy Lynch, Marti Allen-Curmmings, Dan Cohen, and Corey Ortega – sought to counter this advantage through ranked-choice voting and formed a coalition, wherein each of the five candidates advised their own voters to rank the other four coalition members on their ballot.

On election night on June 22, Abreu led the field with 27 percent of the vote, with four members of the opposing coalition coming in second through fifth. When ranked-choice votes and absentee ballots were taken into account two weeks later, Abreu maintained his lead, with 63 percent of the vote to Ordoñez's 37 percent; Abreu formally declared victory on July 2, and his opponents conceded in the succeeding days. In the November general election, Abreu won with over 88% of the vote.

===== 2023 Election Cycle =====
In 2023, Abreu was reelected to the City Council from the 7th district. In the November 7 general election, he received 13,061 votes; the remaining votes cast in the contest were write-in votes.

===== 2025 Election Cycle =====
In 2025, Abreu won the Democratic primary for the 7th Council District, defeating Edafe Okporo and Tiffany Khan in the first round of ranked-choice voting with 20,927 votes (63.0%). He then won reelection in the November 4 general election, receiving 37,859 votes on the Democratic line and 7,584 on the Working Families line, ahead of Republican Manual Williams and West Side United candidate Edafe Okporo.

==== Chair of the Committee on Sanitation and Solid Waste Management ====
From the beginning of 2024 until the end of 2025, Abreu served as the Chair of the Sanitation Committee. While on the committee, he worked with the New York City Department of Sanitation to create a trash containerization pilot program in West Harlem to remove trash bags off the streets and reduce the rat population. Following the pilot program's success, the sanitation committee and council voted to expand on-street trash containerization citywide for larger residential buildings.

Beginning in the 2026 legislative session, Abreu chairs the Transportation & Infrastructure Committee.

==== Legislation ====
In 2022, Abreu voted with other Democratic members of the City Council to cut $215 million from the Department of Education—a vote for which many members later expressed regret. After initially joining the Progressive Caucus, Abreu left in 2023 after refusing to sign onto the group's statement of principles.

Abreu sponsored a bill passed in 2023 that banned weight and height discrimination in hiring and housing across New York City, adding them to a list of protected classes. In 2024, the council passed a bill banning forced brokers fees which was originally co-sponsored by Abreu. In 2025, Uber and DoorDash sued the City of New York over two laws introduced by Abreu that regulate food-delivery app tipping options intended to protect consumer transparency and worker pay.

In 2024, Abreu opposed a ballot measure introduced by Mayor Eric Adams to expand the authority of the Department of Sanitation's enforcement against unlicensed street vendors in New York City.

=== Tenure ===
Abreu is a member of the Vote Blue Coalition, a progressive group and federal PAC created to support Democrats in New York, New Jersey, and Pennsylvania through voter outreach and mobilization efforts. He is on the board of governors of the Jim Owles Liberal Democratic Club.

== Personal life ==
Abreu lives in Washington Heights. He is a member of UAW Local 2325, an association for legal aid attorneys.

== Electoral history ==
=== 2025 ===
2025 New York City Council Democratic primary, District 7
Party	Candidate	Votes	%
Democratic	Shaun Abreu (incumbent)	20,927	63.0
Democratic	Edafe Okporo	8,238	24.8
Democratic	Tiffany Khan	3,890	11.7
Write-in		162	0.5
Total votes		33,217	100.0

2025 New York City Council election, District 7
Party	Candidate	Votes	%
Democratic	Shaun Abreu	37,859	71.9
Working Families	Shaun Abreu	7,584	14.4
Total	Shaun Abreu (incumbent)	45,443	86.3
Republican	Manual Williams	4,674	8.9
West Side United	Edafe Okporo	2,477	4.7
Write-in		90	0.2
Total votes		52,684	100.0
Democratic hold			

=== 2023 ===
2023 New York City Council election, District 7
Party	Candidate	Votes	%
Democratic	Shaun Abreu (incumbent)	13,061	97.4
Write-in		355	2.6
Total votes		13,416	100.0
Democratic hold			

=== 2021 ===
2021 New York City Council Democratic primary, District 7
Party	Candidate	Maximum round	Maximum votes	Share in maximum round	Maximum votes First round votes Transfer votes
Democratic	Shaun Abreu	13	10,491	63.0%	
Democratic	Maria Ordonez	13	6,165	37.0%	
Democratic	Stacy R. Lynch	12	4,180	22.7%	
Democratic	Daniel M. Cohen	10	3,393	17.4%	
Democratic	Marti Gould Allen-Cummings	9	2,973	14.7%	
Democratic	Luis Tejada	8	2,605	12.0%	
Democratic	Keith L. Harris	7	1,375	6.2%	
Democratic	Corey Ortega	6	1,283	5.7%	
Democratic	Miguel Estrella	5	860	3.8%	
Democratic	Carmen R. Quinones	4	818	3.6%	
Democratic	Raymond Sanchez Jr.	3	502	2.2%	
Democratic	Lena Melendez	2	392	1.7%	
Write-In		1	73	0.3%	

2021 New York City Council election, District 7
Party	Candidate	Votes	%
Democratic	Shaun Abreu	20,206	88.9
Black Women Lead	Carmen R. Quinones	1,646	7.2
Black Live Matter	Jomo Manual Williams	747	3.3
Write-in		131	0.6
Total votes		22,730	100.0
Democratic hold			

Political offices
Preceded by Amanda Farias	Majority Leader of the New York City Council; 2026–present	Incumbent
