= 1916 United States presidential election in New Jersey =

- November 7, 1916
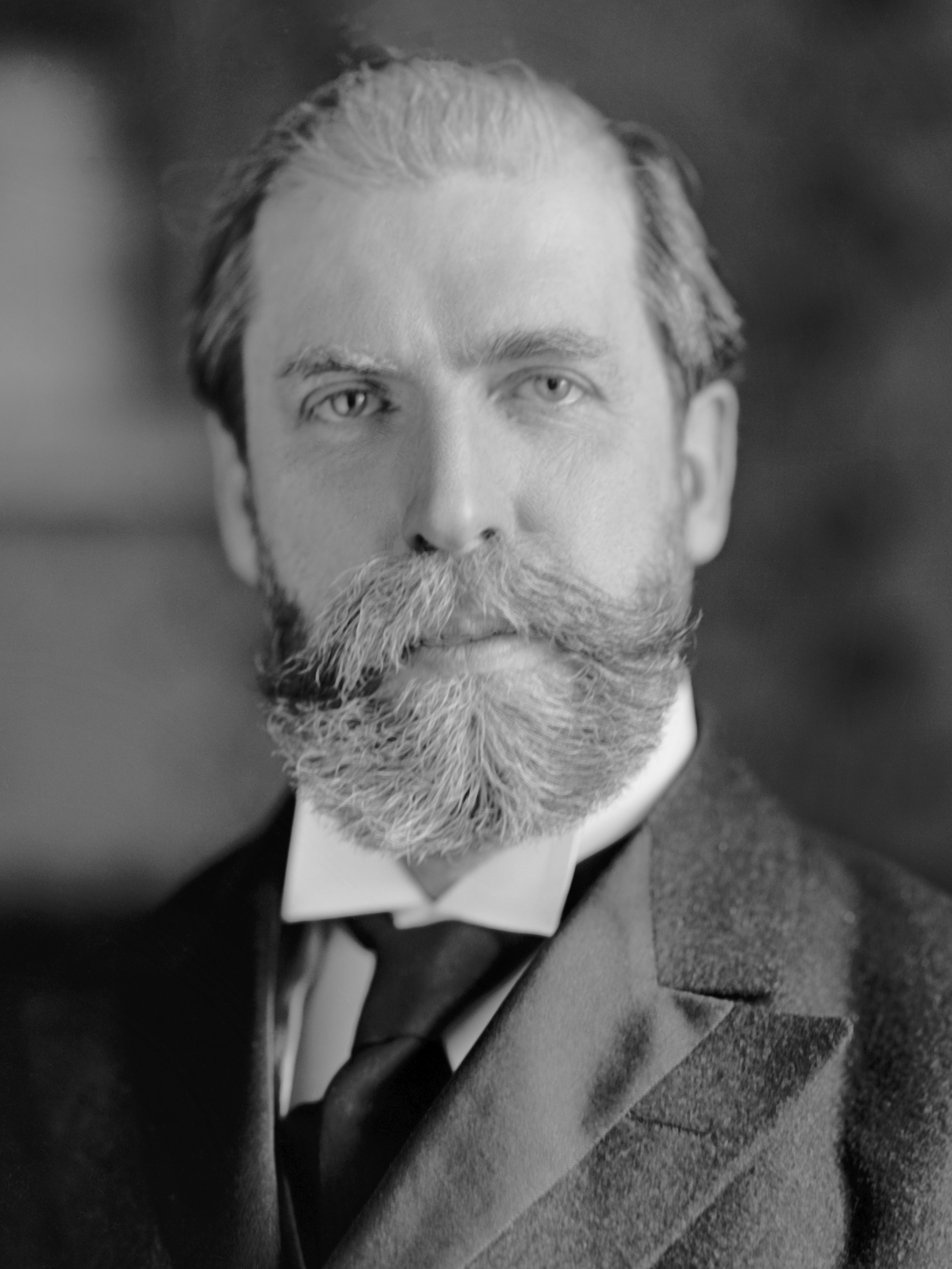

Nominee	Charles Evans Hughes	Woodrow Wilson
Party	Republican	Democratic
Home state	New York	New Jersey
Running mate	Charles W. Fairbanks	Thomas R. Marshall
Electoral vote	14	0
Popular vote	268,982	211,018
Percentage	54.40%	42.68%
County results
Hughes
50–60%
60–70%
Wilson
50–60%
President before election
Woodrow Wilson
Democratic
Elected President
Woodrow Wilson
Democratic

The 1916 United States presidential election in New Jersey took place on November 7, 1916. All contemporary 48 states were part of the 1916 United States presidential election. Voters chose 14 electors to the Electoral College, which selected the president and vice president.

New Jersey was won by the Republican nominees, U.S. Supreme Court Justice Charles Evans Hughes of New York and his running mate, former Vice President Charles W. Fairbanks of Indiana. Hughes and Fairbanks defeated the Democratic nominees, incumbent President Woodrow Wilson of New Jersey and his running mate incumbent Vice President Thomas R. Marshall of Indiana.

Hughes carried New Jersey decisively with 54.40 percent of the vote to Wilson's 42.68 percent, a victory margin of 11.72 points. Coming in a distant third was Socialist candidate Allan L. Benson, who took 2.10 percent.

Like much of the Northeast, New Jersey in this era was a staunchly Republican state, having not given a majority of the vote to a Democratic presidential candidate since 1892. However, in 1912, Woodrow Wilson, then the sitting Governor of New Jersey, had won the state's electoral votes, but with a plurality of only 41 percent in a 3-way race against a split Republican field, with former Republican President Theodore Roosevelt running as a third party candidate against incumbent Republican President William Howard Taft. However, with the Republican base re-united behind Charles Evans Hughes in 1916, Wilson lost his home state to the GOP by a decisive 12-point margin in a head-to-head match-up, despite having served as the state's governor.

On the county-level map, reflecting his comfortable victory, Hughes carried 17 of the state's 21 counties, breaking sixty percent of the vote in three. Wilson's only significant win was urban Hudson County, while he also won the three rural counties in western North Jersey, Warren, Sussex, and Hunterdon, which had long been non-Yankee Democratic enclaves in the otherwise Republican Northeast. Warren and Hunterdon had never voted Republican as of 1916 – and Sussex only for William McKinley in 1896 – yet Wilson would prove the last Democrat to win Sussex County until Lyndon Johnson in 1964.

Despite being Wilson's home state, New Jersey registered as the second most Republican state in the nation in terms of vote share after Vermont and the fourth most Republican state in the nation in terms of margin, the state being about 15 points more Republican than the national average. Woodrow Wilson is one of 4 presidents to lose his home state while winning nationally, which also occurred in 1844, 1968, and 2016. This was the first time a Democrat won without the state since 1844. This is the only time between 1884 and 1948, that New Jersey voted for the loser of the national popular vote. This is the first of just 3 times that New Jersey voted for the loser of the presidential election in the 20th century, the other times being 1948 and 1976.

== Results ==
1916 United States presidential election in New Jersey
Party	Candidate	Votes	Percentage	Electoral votes
Republican	Charles Evans Hughes	268,982	54.40%	14
Democratic	Woodrow Wilson (incumbent)	211,018	42.68%	0
Socialist	Allan L. Benson	10,405	2.10%	0
Prohibition	Frank Hanly	3,182	0.64%	0
Socialist Labor	Arthur E. Reimer	855	0.17%	0
Totals		494,442	100.0%	14

=== Results by county ===
County	Charles Evans Hughes Republican		Woodrow Wilson Democratic		Allan L. Benson Socialist		Frank Hanly Prohibition		Arthur E. Reimer Socialist Labor		Margin		Total votes cast
County	#	%	#	%	#	%	#	%	#	%	#	%	Total votes cast
Atlantic	9,713	62.88%	5,467	35.39%	122	0.79%	133	0.86%	12	0.08%	4,246	27.49%	15,447
Bergen	18,494	60.05%	11,530	37.44%	595	1.93%	113	0.37%	65	0.21%	6,964	22.61%	30,797
Burlington	8,803	56.36%	6,535	41.84%	115	0.74%	158	1.01%	9	0.06%	2,268	14.52%	15,620
Camden	18,318	54.17%	14,010	41.43%	1,101	3.26%	350	1.03%	38	0.11%	4,308	12.74%	33,817
Cape May	2,904	56.85%	2,097	41.05%	37	0.72%	66	1.29%	4	0.08%	807	15.80%	5,108
Cumberland	5,692	52.14%	4,573	41.89%	308	2.82%	323	2.96%	21	0.19%	1,119	10.25%	10,917
Essex	54,167	59.24%	34,596	37.84%	2,280	2.49%	184	0.20%	212	0.23%	19,571	21.40%	91,439
Gloucester	5,352	54.82%	3,745	38.36%	118	1.21%	538	5.51%	9	0.09%	1,607	16.46%	9,762
Hudson	42,518	47.66%	44,663	50.07%	1,811	2.03%	73	0.08%	140	0.16%	-2,145	-2.40%	89,205
Hunterdon	3,408	42.69%	4,462	55.89%	45	0.56%	65	0.81%	4	0.05%	-1,054	-13.20%	7,984
Mercer	14,213	55.75%	10,621	41.66%	460	1.80%	154	0.60%	45	0.18%	3,592	14.09%	25,493
Middlesex	11,851	53.51%	9,975	45.04%	185	0.84%	103	0.47%	32	0.14%	1,876	8.47%	22,146
Monmouth	11,624	51.46%	10,729	47.49%	103	0.46%	120	0.53%	14	0.06%	895	3.96%	22,590
Morris	8,530	54.23%	6,798	43.22%	214	1.36%	172	1.09%	14	0.09%	1,732	11.01%	15,728
Ocean	3,386	61.26%	2,076	37.56%	31	0.56%	28	0.51%	6	0.11%	1,310	23.70%	5,527
Passaic	18,754	55.32%	13,340	39.35%	1,561	4.60%	128	0.38%	121	0.36%	5,414	15.97%	33,904
Salem	4,080	53.77%	3,353	44.19%	68	0.90%	84	1.11%	3	0.04%	727	9.58%	7,588
Somerset	4,707	55.70%	3,653	43.23%	34	0.40%	50	0.59%	7	0.08%	1,054	12.47%	8,451
Sussex	2,461	43.38%	3,093	54.52%	70	1.23%	42	0.74%	7	0.12%	-632	-11.14%	5,673
Union	16,705	59.21%	10,328	36.61%	1,040	3.69%	97	0.34%	44	0.16%	6,377	22.60%	28,214
Warren	3,302	36.56%	5,374	59.50%	107	1.18%	201	2.23%	48	0.53%	-2,072	-22.94%	9,032
Totals	268,982	54.40%	211,018	42.68%	10,405	2.10%	3,182	0.64%	855	0.17%	57,964	11.72%	494,442

== See also ==
- Presidency of Woodrow Wilson
- United States presidential elections in New Jersey
