= 1968 United States presidential election in New York =

- November 5, 1968
- Turnout: 59.7% ▼4.7 pp

Nominee	Hubert Humphrey	Richard Nixon	George Wallace
Party	Democratic	Republican	Courage (Note: New York law forbids the use of the word "American" in a party's name, and so the American Independent Party was named as the "Courage Party" on the ballot in New York State.)
Alliance	Liberal
Home state	Minnesota	New York (Note: Although he was born in California and he served as a U.S. Representative and Senator from California, in 1968 Richard Nixon's official state of residence was New York, having moved there to practice law after his defeat in the 1962 California gubernatorial election. During his first term as president, Nixon re-established his residency in California. Consequently, most reliable reference books list Nixon's home state as New York in the 1968 election and his home state as California in the 1972 (and 1960) election.)	Alabama
Running mate	Edmund Muskie	Spiro Agnew	S. Marvin Griffin
Electoral vote	43	0	0
Popular vote	3,378,470	3,007,932	358,864
Percentage	49.76%	44.30%	5.29%
County results
Humphrey
40–50%
50–60%
60–70%
70–80%
Nixon
40–50%
50–60%
60–70%
President before election
Lyndon B. Johnson
Democratic
Elected President
Richard Nixon
Republican

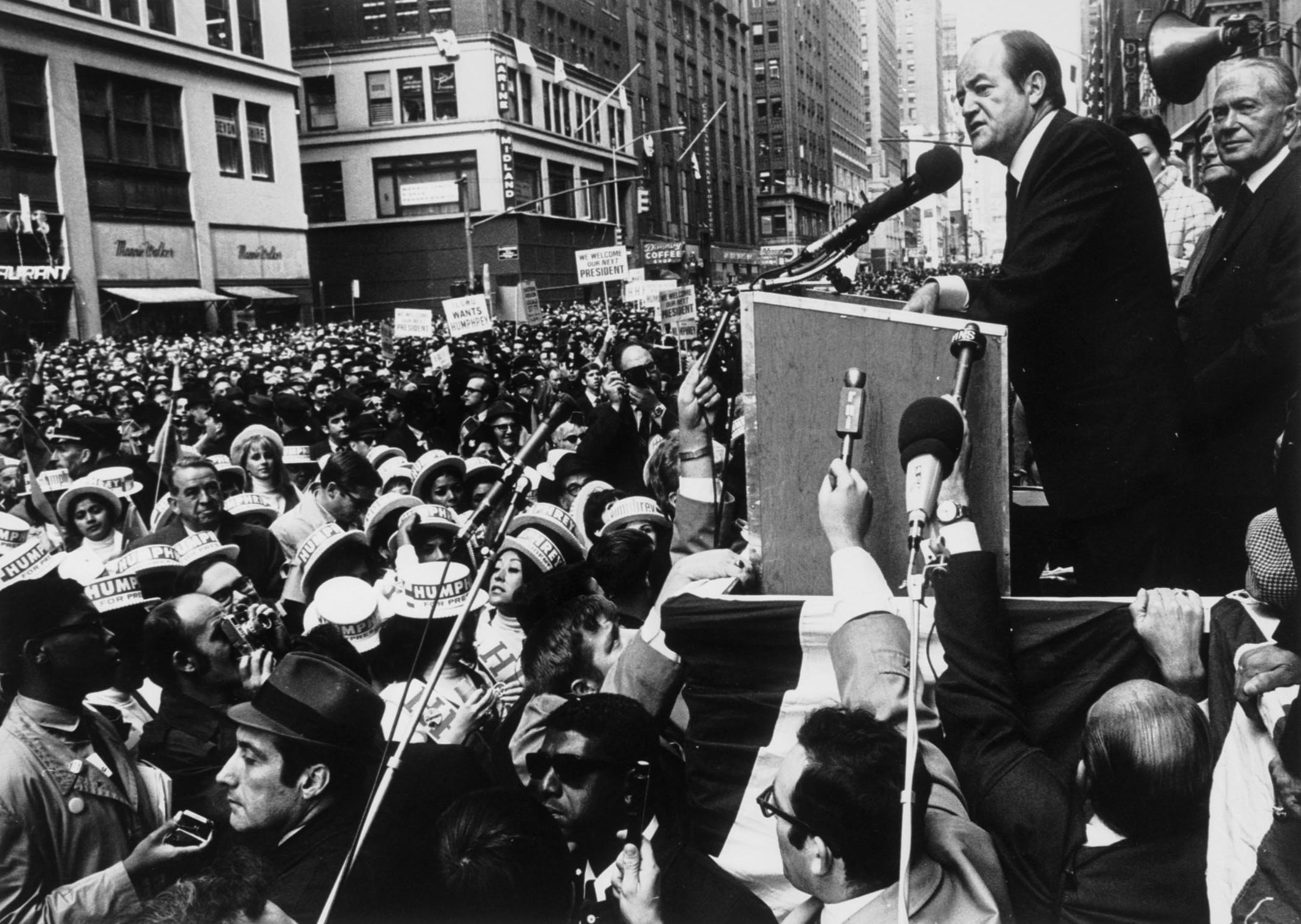
Vice President Hubert Humphrey at a campaign rally in New York City, 1968.

The 1968 United States presidential election in New York took place on November 5, 1968. All 50 states and the District of Columbia, were part of the 1968 United States presidential election. Voters chose 43 electors to the Electoral College, which selected the president and vice president.

New York was won by incumbent Democratic vice president Hubert Humphrey, defeating Republican former vice president Richard Nixon by a margin of 5.46 percentage points and more than 370,000 votes. Maine Senator Edmund Muskie was Humphrey's vice-presidential running mate, while Nixon's running mate was Maryland Governor Spiro Agnew.

Humphrey took 49.76% of the vote to Nixon's 44.30% in New York, while former Alabama Governor George Wallace won 5.29% as the nominee of the American Independent Party. Wallace ran a segregationist and right-wing populist campaign which failed to gain much traction in the Northeast. Wallace did best in suburban and exurban counties, as well as in the New York City borough of Staten Island. Wallace's stances were popular with voters who resented race riots, the increasing influence of African-Americans in the national Democratic Party, and the counterculture, but were anathema to voters in the inner cities and most of Upstate New York.

New York weighed in for this election as 7% more Democratic than the nation. Almost six percent of the electorate voted for third parties, mainly the American Independent Party. In typical form for the time, the major cities of New York City, Buffalo, Albany, Schenectady, and Niagara Falls voted Democratic, while the smaller counties in New York mainly turned out for Nixon as the Republican candidate. Nixon thus became the first Republican to win the White House without carrying Erie County since Abraham Lincoln in 1864, the first to do so without carrying Niagara or Schenectady Counties since Rutherford B. Hayes in 1876, as well as the first to do so without carrying Albany or Queens Counties since Herbert Hoover in 1928.

Despite Nixon winning most of the state's counties, Humphrey's landslide margin in New York City — receiving 60.6% of the vote in the five boroughs to Nixon's 33.9%, and losing only Staten Island to Nixon — provided him with enough raw votes for a statewide victory. Humphrey was seen by many as promising to continue the legacy of president Lyndon B. Johnson, and this garnered him strong support from liberal voters across America.

This was the first time since Samuel J. Tilden won the state in 1876 that New York voted for a losing Democratic candidate and it was the first time that New York voted for a Democrat that lost the national popular vote. As of 2020, this remains the last time that New York had the largest number of electoral votes in the nation, as California would overtake it after the 1970 census. Nixon is one of four presidents to win the presidency while losing his home state (the others being James K. Polk with Tennessee in 1844, Woodrow Wilson with New Jersey in 1916, and Donald Trump with New York in 2016).

Eldridge Cleaver, the presidential nominee for the Peace and Freedom Party was not listed on the ballot in New York as he was found in court to have been underage for president as Cleaver was 33 and that "he had failed to file a proper acceptance of the nomination".

== Results ==
1968 United States presidential election in New York
Party	Candidate	Votes	Percentage	Electoral votes
Democratic	Hubert Humphrey	3,066,848	45.17%	
Liberal	Hubert Humphrey	311,622	4.59%	
Total	Hubert Humphrey	3,378,470	49.76%	43
Republican	Richard Nixon	3,007,932	44.30%	0
Courage	George Wallace	358,864	5.29%	0
Peace and Freedom	Dick Gregory	24,517	0.36%	0
Socialist Workers	Fred Halstead	11,851	0.17%	0
Socialist Labor	Henning Blomen	8,432	0.12%	0
Totals		6,790,066	100.0%	43

=== New York City results ===
Results by borough for the 1968 US presidential election in New York City.

1968 presidential election in New York City		Manhattan	The Bronx	Brooklyn	Queens	Staten Island	Total	
Democratic- Liberal	Hubert Humphrey	370,806	277,385	489,174	410,546	34,770	1,582,681	60.56%
Democratic- Liberal	Hubert Humphrey	70.04%	62.40%	63.12%	53.60%	35.18%	1,582,681	60.56%
Republican	Richard Nixon	135,458	142,314	247,936	306,620	54,631	886,959	33.94%
Republican	Richard Nixon	25.59%	32.02%	31.99%	40.03%	55.28%	886,959	33.94%
Courage	George Wallace	12,958	21,950	33,563	44,198	9,112	121,781	4.66%
Courage	George Wallace	2.45%	4.94%	4.33%	5.77%	9.22%	121,781	4.66%
Peace and Freedom	Dick Gregory	8,610	1,767	2,857	3,104	123	16,461	0.63%
Peace and Freedom	Dick Gregory	1.63%	0.40%	0.37%	0.41%	0.12%	16,461	0.63%
Socialist Labor	Henning A. Blomen	818	836	1,039	1,091	164	3,948	0.15%
Socialist Labor	Henning A. Blomen	0.15%	0.19%	0.13%	0.14%	0.17%	3,948	0.15%
Socialist Workers	Fred Halstead	742	265	400	353	24	1,784	0.07%
Socialist Workers	Fred Halstead	0.14%	0.06%	0.05%	0.05%	0.02%	1,784	0.07%
TOTAL		529,392	444,517	774,969	765,912	98,824	2,613,614	100.00%

=== Results by county ===
County	Hubert Humphrey Democratic/Liberal		Richard Nixon Republican		George Wallace Courage		Dick Gregory Peace and Freedom		Various candidates Other parties		Margin		Total votes cast
County	#	%	#	%	#	%	#	%	#	%	#	%	Total votes cast
Albany	80,724	57.93%	52,948	38.00%	5,025	3.61%	189	0.14%	508	0.36%	27,776	19.93%	139,351
Allegany	4,986	29.08%	11,222	65.45%	851	4.96%	22	0.13%	75	0.44%	−6,236	−36.37%	17,145
Bronx	277,385	62.40%	142,314	32.02%	21,950	4.94%	1,767	0.40%	1,116	0.25%	135,071	30.38%	444,517
Broome	37,451	41.93%	46,872	52.48%	4,618	5.17%	110	0.12%	321	0.36%	−9,421	−10.55%	89,311
Cattaraugus	12,733	40.88%	16,594	53.27%	1,674	5.37%	31	0.10%	125	0.40%	−3,861	−12.39%	31,148
Cayuga	14,604	44.71%	16,167	49.49%	1,826	5.59%	20	0.06%	53	0.16%	−1,563	−4.78%	32,666
Chautauqua	26,431	45.18%	28,561	48.82%	3,273	5.59%	47	0.08%	195	0.33%	−2,130	−3.64%	58,507
Chemung	15,820	40.00%	20,693	52.32%	2,807	7.10%	35	0.09%	198	0.50%	−4,873	−12.32%	39,553
Chenango	5,706	30.92%	11,785	63.86%	887	4.81%	12	0.07%	65	0.35%	−6,079	−32.94%	18,455
Clinton	10,153	43.82%	11,951	51.58%	931	4.02%	28	0.12%	113	0.49%	−1,798	−7.76%	23,168
Columbia	7,762	33.62%	13,857	60.03%	1,372	5.94%	41	0.18%	54	0.23%	−6,095	−26.41%	23,085
Cortland	5,791	34.47%	10,209	60.76%	720	4.29%	31	0.18%	67	0.40%	−4,418	−26.29%	16,801
Delaware	5,360	28.36%	12,366	65.44%	1,121	5.93%	18	0.10%	33	0.17%	−7,006	−37.08%	18,898
Dutchess	31,025	37.80%	45,032	54.87%	5,662	6.90%	214	0.26%	189	0.23%	−14,007	−17.07%	82,067
Erie	250,054	55.18%	167,853	37.04%	33,402	7.37%	679	0.15%	1,283	0.28%	82,201	18.14%	453,165
Essex	5,218	33.98%	9,377	61.07%	701	4.57%	15	0.10%	50	0.33%	−4,159	−27.09%	15,355
Franklin	6,678	42.80%	8,314	53.29%	544	3.49%	9	0.06%	59	0.38%	−1,636	−10.49%	15,602
Fulton	8,871	40.66%	11,895	54.52%	989	4.53%	20	0.09%	43	0.20%	−3,024	−13.86%	21,818
Genesee	9,533	41.18%	12,418	53.64%	1,141	4.93%	9	0.04%	49	0.21%	−2,885	−12.46%	23,150
Greene	5,499	30.56%	10,954	60.87%	1,421	7.90%	20	0.11%	127	0.70%	−5,455	−30.31%	17,997
Hamilton	762	24.96%	2,123	69.54%	163	5.34%	1	0.03%	4	0.13%	−1,361	−44.58%	3,053
Herkimer	10,940	39.54%	15,192	54.91%	1,455	5.26%	15	0.05%	75	0.27%	−4,252	−15.37%	27,665
Jefferson	13,438	40.59%	18,552	56.03%	1,016	3.07%	17	0.05%	100	0.30%	−5,114	−15.44%	33,109
Kings	489,174	63.12%	247,936	31.99%	33,563	4.33%	2,857	0.37%	1,537	0.20%	241,238	31.13%	774,969
Lewis	3,205	34.91%	5,524	60.17%	430	4.68%	5	0.05%	19	0.21%	−2,319	−25.26%	9,180
Livingston	6,989	35.82%	11,659	59.75%	775	3.97%	24	0.12%	66	0.34%	−4,670	−23.93%	19,513
Madison	7,056	32.06%	13,819	62.79%	1,053	4.78%	14	0.06%	68	0.31%	−6,763	−30.73%	22,010
Monroe	141,437	47.66%	143,233	48.27%	10,875	3.66%	446	0.15%	764	0.26%	−1,796	−0.61%	296,755
Montgomery	11,449	45.33%	12,566	49.75%	1,147	4.54%	24	0.10%	71	0.28%	−1,117	−4.42%	25,257
Nassau	278,599	43.31%	329,792	51.27%	30,860	4.80%	2,107	0.33%	2,224	0.35%	−51,193	−7.96%	643,195
New York	370,806	70.04%	135,458	25.59%	12,958	2.45%	8,610	1.63%	1,632	0.31%	235,348	44.45%	529,392
Niagara	41,999	47.77%	38,796	44.12%	6,617	7.53%	59	0.07%	454	0.52%	3,203	3.65%	87,925
Oneida	44,685	43.07%	52,875	50.96%	5,666	5.46%	75	0.07%	460	0.44%	−8,190	−7.89%	103,761
Onondaga	83,576	44.02%	95,806	50.46%	9,459	4.98%	272	0.14%	767	0.40%	−12,230	−6.44%	189,865
Ontario	11,719	38.94%	17,114	56.86%	1,180	3.92%	28	0.09%	57	0.19%	−5,395	−17.92%	30,098
Orange	28,122	35.09%	44,955	56.09%	6,473	8.08%	129	0.16%	502	0.63%	−16,833	−21.00%	80,149
Orleans	4,786	34.13%	8,509	60.67%	696	4.96%	6	0.04%	35	0.25%	−3,723	−26.54%	14,024
Oswego	14,636	39.72%	20,041	54.39%	1,962	5.33%	39	0.11%	167	0.45%	−5,405	−14.67%	36,845
Otsego	7,981	35.16%	13,543	59.67%	1,091	4.81%	44	0.19%	49	0.22%	−5,562	−24.51%	22,696
Putnam	8,472	34.84%	13,293	54.67%	2,388	9.82%	45	0.18%	129	0.53%	−4,821	−19.83%	24,314
Queens	410,546	53.60%	306,620	40.03%	44,198	5.77%	3,104	0.41%	1,544	0.20%	103,926	13.57%	765,912
Rensselaer	30,232	44.02%	34,674	50.49%	3,461	5.04%	53	0.08%	261	0.38%	−4,442	−6.47%	68,681
Richmond	34,770	35.18%	54,631	55.28%	9,112	9.22%	123	0.12%	202	0.20%	−19,861	−20.10%	98,824
Rockland	36,948	44.35%	40,880	49.07%	5,028	6.04%	303	0.36%	178	0.21%	−3,932	−4.72%	83,307
St. Lawrence	15,662	41.29%	20,982	55.31%	1,178	3.11%	52	0.14%	63	0.17%	−5,320	−14.02%	37,933
Saratoga	17,766	38.69%	25,658	55.87%	2,220	4.83%	36	0.08%	255	0.56%	−7,892	−17.18%	45,922
Schenectady	34,786	48.31%	33,687	46.79%	3,246	4.51%	86	0.12%	247	0.34%	1,099	1.52%	72,002
Schoharie	3,883	36.03%	6,166	57.21%	689	6.39%	12	0.11%	27	0.25%	−2,283	−21.18%	10,777
Schuyler	2,034	30.38%	4,105	61.31%	522	7.80%	8	0.12%	27	0.40%	−2,071	−30.93%	6,696
Seneca	5,222	40.15%	7,083	54.46%	635	4.88%	17	0.13%	51	0.39%	−1,861	−14.31%	13,005
Steuben	12,229	31.61%	24,189	62.52%	2,194	5.67%	20	0.05%	58	0.15%	−11,960	−30.91%	38,690
Suffolk	122,590	32.71%	218,027	58.18%	31,304	8.35%	776	0.21%	2,178	0.58%	−95,437	−25.47%	374,767
Sullivan	10,860	44.88%	11,657	48.17%	1,487	6.15%	56	0.23%	138	0.57%	−797	−3.29%	24,198
Tioga	5,336	31.47%	10,441	61.58%	1,127	6.65%	9	0.05%	43	0.25%	−5,105	−30.11%	16,956
Tompkins	10,343	40.97%	13,446	53.26%	1,236	4.90%	161	0.64%	124	0.49%	−3,103	−12.29%	25,248
Ulster	20,886	34.59%	34,798	57.62%	4,183	6.93%	191	0.32%	394	0.65%	−13,912	−23.03%	60,387
Warren	6,460	31.85%	12,963	63.92%	807	3.98%	15	0.07%	35	0.17%	−6,503	−32.07%	20,280
Washington	6,806	33.09%	12,694	61.71%	930	4.52%	17	0.08%	123	0.60%	−5,888	−28.62%	20,569
Wayne	8,907	32.17%	17,470	63.09%	1,211	4.37%	14	0.05%	93	0.34%	−8,563	−30.92%	27,689
Westchester	173,954	43.40%	201,652	50.31%	22,115	5.52%	1,318	0.33%	1,906	0.48%	−27,698	−6.91%	400,807
Wyoming	4,477	32.52%	8,459	61.45%	799	5.80%	5	0.04%	25	0.18%	−3,982	−28.93%	13,765
Yates	2,158	26.59%	5,482	67.54%	440	5.42%	7	0.09%	30	0.37%	−3,324	−40.95%	8,117
Totals	3,378,470	49.76%	3,007,932	44.30%	358,864	5.29%	24,517	0.36%	20,283	0.30%	370,538	5.46%	6,790,066

==== Counties that flipped from Democratic to Republican ====
- Allegany
- Broome
- Cattaraugus
- Cayuga
- Chautauqua
- Chemung
- Chenango
- Clinton
- Columbia
- Cortland
- Delaware
- Dutchess
- Essex
- Franklin
- Fulton
- Genesee
- Greene
- Hamilton
- Herkimer
- Jefferson
- Lewis
- Livingston
- Madison
- Monroe
- Montgomery
- Nassau
- Onondaga
- Oneida
- Ontario
- Orange
- Orleans
- Oswego
- Otsego
- Putnam
- Rensselaer
- Richmond
- Rockland
- St. Lawrence
- Saratoga
- Schoharie
- Schuyler
- Seneca
- Steuben
- Suffolk
- Sullivan
- Tioga
- Tompkins
- Ulster
- Warren
- Washington
- Wayne
- Westchester
- Wyoming
- Yates

=== Results by congressional district ===
Results are grouped by the percentage of the popular vote nationally in that order. The candidates are listed by the percentage of the vote won in that respective district.

District	Nixon	Humphrey	Wallace
1st	58%	33%	9%
2nd	56.2%	37%	6.8%
3rd	48.9%	47.2%	3.9%
4th	53%	42.1%	5%
5th	51.3%	43.6%	5.1%
6th	45.6%	49%	3.4%
7th	33.7%	60.6%	5.7%
8th	40.3%	54.2%	5.5%
9th	48.2%	43.2%	7.9%
10th	29%	67.9%	3.2%
11th	32.7%	62.5%	4.8%
12th	17.5%	79.5%	3%
13rd	26.8%	70%	3.2%
14th	33.8%	59.8%	6.4%
15th	50.7%	42%	7.3%
16th	57.2%	35.8%	7%
17th	38.3%	59.3%	2.4%
18th	9.5%	89.9%	0.6%
19th	26.6%	69.4%	3.9%
20th	24.5%	72.5%	4.81%
21st	25.7%	70%	4.4%
22nd	30.5%	64.4%	5.1%
23rd	26.8%	69.2%	4%
24th	46.9%	45.7%	7.4%
25th	52%	41.8%	6.2%
26th	50.9%	44.7%	4.4%
27th	51.4%	41.2%	7.3%
28th	58.2%	35.5%	6.3%
29th	42.3%	53.8%	3.9%
30th	50.1%	45.6%	4.4%
31st	54%	41.5%	4.5%
32nd	51.6%	43.3%	5.1%
33rd	52.3%	42.1%	5.6%
34th	51.5%	43.5%	4.9%
35th	54.3%	41%	4.7%
36th	49.3%	47.2%	3.5%
37th	48.7%	46.7%	4.6%
38th	53.3%	41%	5.7%
39th	41.6%	51.3%	7.1%
40th	42.8%	50.4%	6.8%
41st	20%	72.6%	7.4%

== See also ==
- United States presidential elections in New York
- 1968 Democratic National Convention
- Civil Rights Movement
- Presidency of Richard Nixon
- Watergate Scandal
- Vietnam War
