= Junior High School 149 =

Public junior high school in New York City

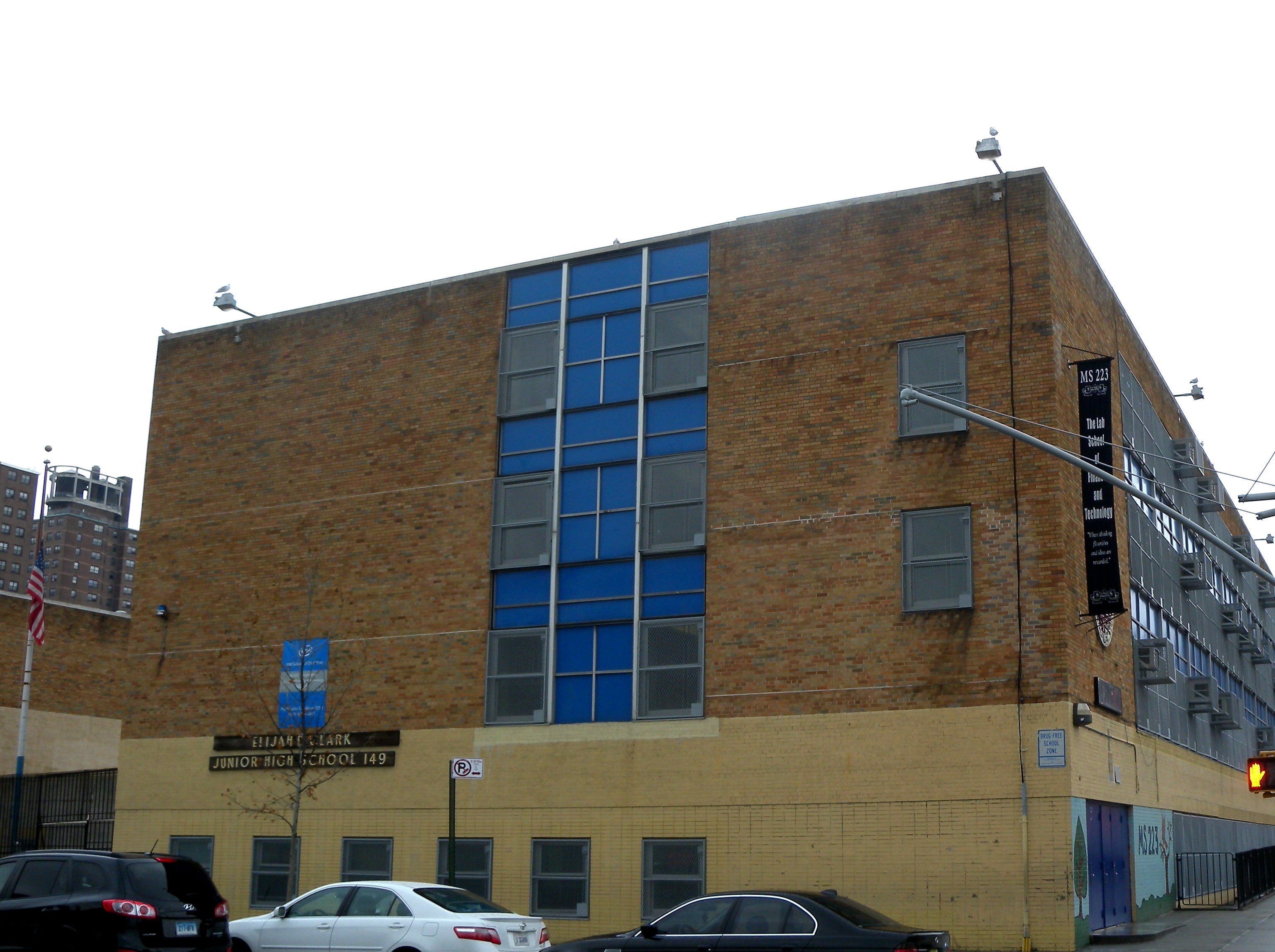
The school building in 2011

Junior High School 149 Elijah D. Clark was a public junior high school in New York City, New York from 1906 to 2004.

The school was at 360 East 145th Street in the Mott Haven section of the South Bronx. It was named for its first principal, Elijah D. Clark, who previously had served as a teacher and assistant principal in the Bronx. There were two Elijah D. Clark Junior High schools in this part of the Bronx. The earlier one was PS 37, Bronx, (which spanned) 145th Street and 146th Street, near Willis Avenue. Pictures from December 6, 1905 and 1908 also attesting to the address near where the later school was built are on the NYC Municipal Archives website. and the later one P.S. 149, that appears to be close to where P.S. 37 was. Dr. Elijah D. Clark was principal of P. S. 37 as far back as 1906. In 1905 he was principal of Bronx Public School 31, located at Mott and Walton Avenues, 145th and 146th Streets. He died on June 25, 1916, aged 66 years. He began to teach in the New York schools in 1872, and became a principal in 1889. In the same area, P.S 149 took the place of P.S. 37.

Reflecting its surrounding neighborhood, the school served a primarily Puerto Rican and African-American student body. JHS 149 was the scene of several violent incidents in its later years, including the murder of a student in 1990. An assistant principal was arrested on drug charges in 1995. JHS 149 was closed in 2004 due to poor academic performance. Today, the school building is occupied by Bronx Preparatory Charter School and MS223.

Manhattan Borough president and former New York City Councilmember Mark D. Levine was a teacher at the school from 1991 to 1993.

== Notable alumni ==
- Walden Cassotto (Bobby Darin) and Dick Brookz, founder of The Houdini Museum
- Rubén Díaz, Jr., Bronx Borough President
- Harry Feldman, Major League Baseball pitcher
