= Harry Feldman =

American baseball player (1919-1962)

- Harry Feldman, in a photoshoot for the New York Giants
- Pitcher
- Born: November 10, 1919; New York, New York, U.S.
- Died: March 16, 1962 (age 42); Fort Smith, Arkansas, U.S.
- Batted: Right Threw: Right

MLB debut
- September 10, 1941, for the New York Giants

Last MLB appearance
- April 25, 1946, for the New York Giants

MLB statistics
- Win–loss record: 35–35
- Earned run average: 3.80
- Strikeouts: 254
- Stats at Baseball Reference

Teams
- New York Giants (1941–1946)

Harry Feldman (November 10, 1919 – March 16, 1962) was an American Major League Baseball pitcher who played for the New York Giants from 1941 to 1946.

== Early and personal life ==
Feldman was born and grew up in the Bronx, and was Jewish, the son of a Romanian Jewish father and a Polish Jewish mother. Feldman attended Clark Junior High School in the Bronx.

Feldman was a 6 ft 0 in (1.83 m), 175 lb (79 kg) right-hander.

== Minor league career ==
Feldman pitched for the Blytheville Giants of the Northeast Arkansas League in 1938. He had a 13–1 record and 2.02 ERA, both the best in the league that year. He was moved to the Fort Smith Giants of the Western Association, where he was 7–7 with a 3.98 ERA in 1938. In 1939 his record was 25–9. With the Jersey City Giants in 1940, Feldman was 5–13 with a 3.64 ERA. In 1941 he went 14–16 with a 3.42 ERA.

== Major league career ==
Feldman won his first major league game in his second start, a 4–0 shutout over the Boston Braves in the second game of a doubleheader at the Polo Grounds (September 21, 1941). With All-Star Giants catcher Harry Danning behind the plate, that appearance may have been the first all-Jewish battery in MLB history.

In 1944 Feldman was 9th in the NL with 40 games pitched. In 1945 Feldman was 6th in the NL in games started (30) and shutouts (3), and 9th in innings (217.7) and batters faced (933). He was 12–13, with a 3.27 ERA.

His career totals include a 35–35 record, 143 games pitched, 78 starts, 22 complete games, 6 shutouts, 28 games finished, and 3 saves. In 666 innings pitched Feldman struck out 254, walked 300, and had an earned run average of 3.80.

In 1946, Feldman joined what became a total of 27 major league players, including Max Lanier, Mickey Owens, Vern Stephens and George Hausmann, in jumping to the "outlaw" Mexican League. Feldman signed with the Azules de Veracruz. The following year he played in Havana, Cuba. In 1949 he pitched for a while in the Provincial League for Sherbrooke, Quebec, and then moved to San Francisco where he pitched his last two seasons with the San Francisco Seals, going 6–9 with a 4.31 ERA in 1949 and 11–16 with a 4.38 ERA in 1950. He retired at the end of that season.

Feldman was 8th lifetime in ERA of all Jewish major league pitchers through 2010, behind among others Sandy Koufax and Ken Holtzman.

== After baseball ==
Feldman was very active in the local semi-pro league.

On March 16, 1962, at age 42, Feldman died of a massive heart attack while tending his boat at Lake Tenkiller in nearby Oklahoma. He is buried at Rose Lawn Cemetery, Fort Smith, Arkansas.

== See also ==
- List of Jewish Major League Baseball players
