= Neighborhood Trust =

Neighborhood Trust Federal Credit Union is a community development financial institution serving low-income residents in the New York City neighborhoods of Washington Heights, Inwood, Hamilton Heights, and West Harlem. The credit union’s non-profit parent organization, Neighborhood Trust Financial Partners, works with a wide network of community-based organizations to provide financial literacy training to low-income adults throughout New York City.

Neighborhood Trust Financial Partners (formerly Credit Where Credit Is Due) was founded in 1994 by community activists Mark D. Levine and Luis De Los Santos, with a mission of empowering the overwhelmingly low-income, Latino residents of Northern Manhattan. Neighborhood Trust FCU received its federal charter in 1996, and opened to the community in a formerly abandoned bank branch in 1997. Since 2013 Neighborhood Trust FCU has been led by Rafael Monge-Portaro.

Neighborhood Trust FCU has grown to a membership of nearly 5,000, and has cumulatively lent out more than $15 million in small loans, helping local residents purchase home computers, pay for education, pay off loan sharks (known locally as prestamistas), start small businesses, etc. Today Neighborhood Trust's financial education and counseling programs are in over 30 community organizations throughout New York City, reaching nearly 6,000 individuals annually.
