= New York City's 7th City Council district =

- Boundaries following the 2020 census

Government
  - Councilmember: Shaun Abreu (D—Manhattan Valley)

Population (2010)
  - Total: 156,217

Demographics
  - Hispanic: 49%
  - Black: 26%
  - White: 19%
  - Asian: 3%
  - Other: 2%

Registration
  - Democratic: 78.0%
  - Republican: 4.2%
  - No party preference: 15.3%
- Registered voters (2021) 123,882

New York City's 7th City Council district is one of 51 districts in the New York City Council. It is currently represented by Democrat Shaun Abreu, who took office in 2022.

== Geography ==
District 7 covers a series of small neighborhoods in upper Manhattan, including Hamilton Heights, Morningside Heights, Manhattanville, Manhattan Valley, and parts of Washington Heights and the Upper West Side. Columbia University, Riverside Church, Grant's Tomb, Morningside Park, and the northern half of Riverside Park are all located within the district.

The district overlaps with Manhattan Community Boards 7, 9, and 12 and with New York's 10th and 13th congressional districts. It also overlaps with the 30th and 31st districts of the New York State Senate, and with the 69th, 70th, and 71st districts of the New York State Assembly.

== Recent election results ==
=== 2025 ===
2025 New York City Council election, District 7
Primary election
Party	Candidate	Votes	%
Democratic	Shaun Abreu (incumbent)	20,927	63.0
Democratic	Edafe Okporo	8,238	24.8
Democratic	Tiffany Khan	3,890	11.7
Write-in		162	0.5
Total votes		33,856	100.0
General election
Democratic	Shaun Abreu	37,859	
Working Families	Shaun Abreu	7,584	
Total	Shaun Abreu (incumbent)	45,443	86.3
Republican	Manual Williams	4,674	8.8
West Side United	Edafe Okporo	2,477	4.7
Write-in		88	0.2
Total votes		52,682	100.0
Democratic hold			

=== 2023 (redistricting) ===
Due to redistricting and the 2020 changes to the New York City Charter, councilmembers elected during the 2021 and 2023 City Council elections will serve two-year terms, with full four-year terms resuming after the 2025 New York City Council elections.

2023 New York City Council election, District 7
Party	Candidate	Votes	%
Democratic	Shaun Abreu (incumbent)	13,061	97.4
Write-in		354	2.6
Total votes		13,415	100.0
Democratic hold			

=== 2021 ===
In 2019, voters in New York City approved Ballot Question 1, which implemented ranked-choice voting in all local elections. Under the new system, voters have the option to rank up to five candidates for every local office. Voters whose first-choice candidates fare poorly will have their votes redistributed to other candidates in their ranking until one candidate surpasses the 50 percent threshold. If one candidate surpasses 50 percent in first-choice votes, then ranked-choice tabulations will not occur.

2021 New York City Council election, District 7 Democratic primary
Party	Candidate	Maximum round	Maximum votes	Share in maximum round	Maximum votes First round votes Transfer votes
Democratic	Shaun Abreu	13	10,491	63.0%	
Democratic	Maria Ordoñez	13	6,165	37.0%	
Democratic	Stacy Lynch	12	4,180	22.7%	
Democratic	Dan Cohen	10	3,393	17.4%	
Democratic	Marti Allen-Cummings	9	2,973	14.7%	
Democratic	Luis Tejada	8	2,605	12.0%	
Democratic	Keith Harris	7	1,375	6.2%	
Democratic	Corey Ortega	6	1,283	5.7%	
Democratic	Miguel Estrella	5	860	3.8%	
Democratic	Carmen Quiñones	4	818	3.6%	
Democratic	Ray Sanchez	3	502	2.2%	
Democratic	Lena Melendez	2	392	1.7%	
Write-in		1	73	0.3%	

An interactive map of District 7

2021 New York City Council election, District 7 general election
Party	Candidate	Votes	%
Democratic	Shaun Abreu	20,206	88.8
Black Women Lead	Carmen Quiñones	1,646	7.2
Black Lives Matter	Jomo Williams	747	3.3
Write-in		130	0.6
Total votes		22,729	100
Democratic hold			

=== 2017 ===
2017 New York City Council election, District 7
Primary election
Party	Candidate	Votes	%
Democratic	Mark Levine (incumbent)	9,286	74.1
Democratic	Thomas Lopez-Pierre	3,179	25.4
Write-in		71	0.5
Total votes		12,536	100
General election
Democratic	Mark Levine	20,364	
Working Families	Mark Levine	1,931	
Total	Mark Levine (incumbent)	22,295	94.8
Green	Florindo Troncelliti	1,148	4.9
Write-in		73	0.3
Total votes		23,516	100
Democratic hold			

=== 2013 ===
2013 New York City Council election, District 7
Primary election
Party	Candidate	Votes	%
Democratic	Mark Levine	7,454	41.4
Democratic	Joyce Johnson	3,108	17.3
Democratic	Luis Tejada	2,561	14.2
Democratic	Miguel Lantigua	1,354	7.5
Democratic	Alicia Barksdale	821	4.6
Democratic	David Sasscer-Burgos	679	3.8
Democratic	Zead Ramadan	657	3.6
Democratic	Mark Otto	619	3.4
Democratic	Rubén Dario Vargas	523	2.9
Democratic	Brodie Enoch	231	1.3
Write-in		3	0.0
Total votes		18,010	100
General election
Democratic	Mark Levine	18,105	
Working Families	Mark Levine	1,168	
Total	Mark Levine	19,273	87.5
Green	Christina Gonzalez	1,700	7.7
Write-in	Luis Tejada	960	4.4
Write-in		101	0.4
Total votes		22,034	100
Democratic hold			
