= Barack Obama Democratic Club of Upper Manhattan =

The Barack Obama Democratic Club of Upper Manhattan is a reform-oriented political club in New York City focused on progressive activism and electing progressive candidates to local office. The club serves the neighborhoods of Washington Heights, Inwood, and West Harlem/Hamilton Heights.

The Obama Club was founded in 2009 by Mark Levine, a Democratic District Leader and Northern Manhattan political activist. The group emerged from the grassroots network of Upper Manhattan volunteers which coalesced around the 2008 presidential campaign of Barack Obama.

Since its founding the Obama club has become known for its ethnically diverse membership and its grassroots activism. Issues the club has focused on include immigration, affordable housing, economic justice, and marriage equality. Club volunteers have helped elect a variety of progressive local candidates, including Public Advocate Bill de Blasio, Sen. Adriano Espaillat, Attorney General Eric Schneiderman, Comptroller John Liu, and Assm. Gabriela Rosa.
