= 1841 Tennessee gubernatorial election =

- August 5, 1841
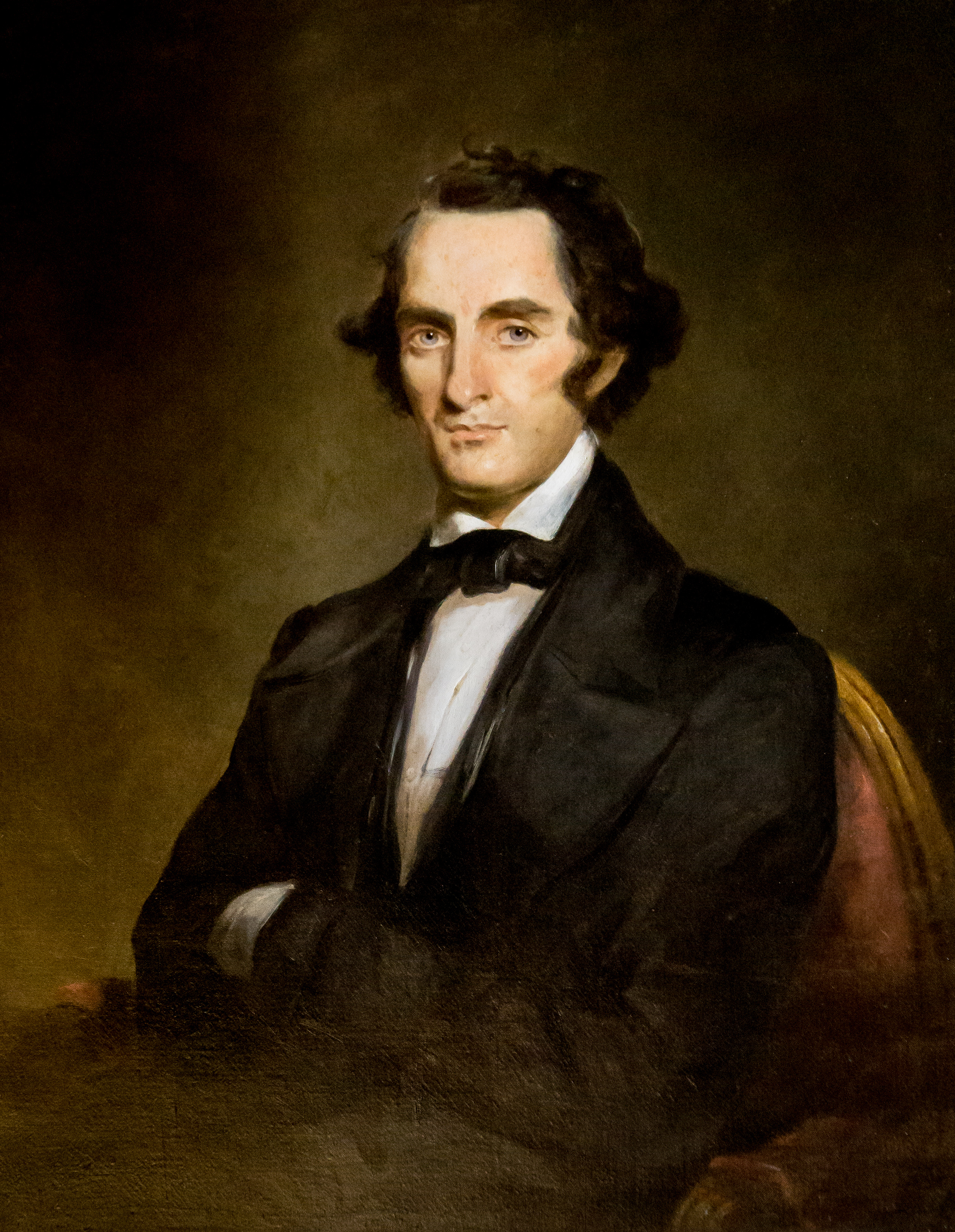

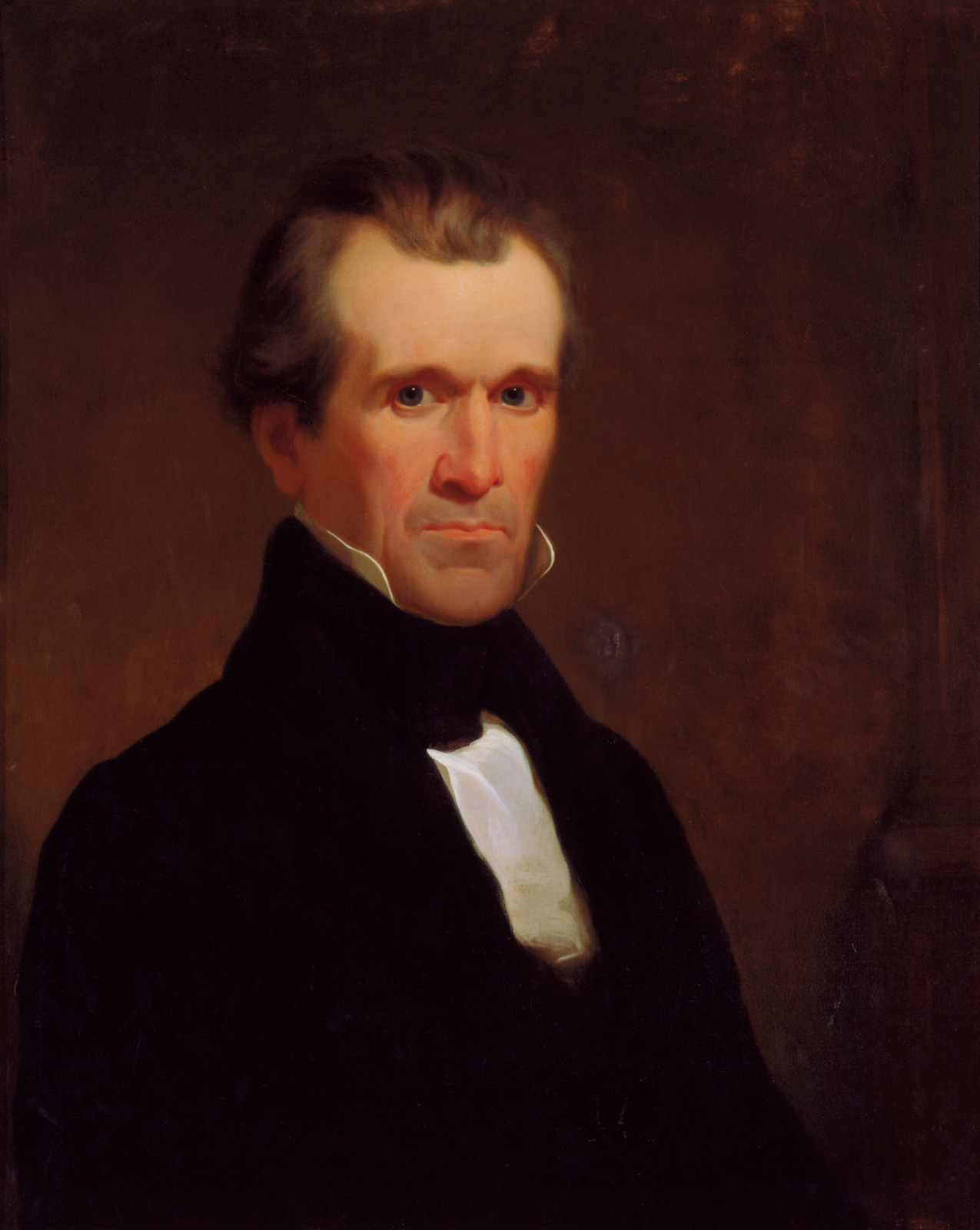
Nominee	James C. Jones	James K. Polk
Party	Whig	Democratic
Popular vote	53,586	50,343
Percentage	51.56%	48.44%
- County results Jones: 50–60% 60–70% 70–80% 80–90% >90% Polk: 50–60% 60–70% 70–80% 70–80% 80–90% No data/No votes
Governor before election
James K. Polk
Democratic
Elected Governor
James C. Jones
Whig

The 1841 Tennessee gubernatorial election was held on August 5, 1841, to elect the Governor of Tennessee. Incumbent Democratic Governor and future American President James K. Polk lost re-election against Whig nominee James C. Jones, thus becoming the first native-born Tennessean to be elected governor of the state.

Former Whig Governor Newton Cannon wanted to run against Polk again, but Whig leaders instead nominated James C. Jones, thinking that Cannon would not be able to defeat Polk.

== General election ==
On election day, August 5, 1841, Whig nominee James C. Jones won the election by a margin of 3,243 votes against his Democratic opponent and incumbent Governor James K. Polk, thereby gaining Whig control over the office of Governor. Jones was sworn in as the 10th Governor of Tennessee on October 15, 1841.

=== Results ===
Tennessee gubernatorial election, 1841
Party	Candidate	Votes	%
Whig	James C. Jones	53,586	51.56%
Democratic	James K. Polk (incumbent)	50,343	48.44%
Total votes		103,929	100.00%
Whig gain from Democratic			
