= Mark Levine (New York politician) =

American politician (born 1969)

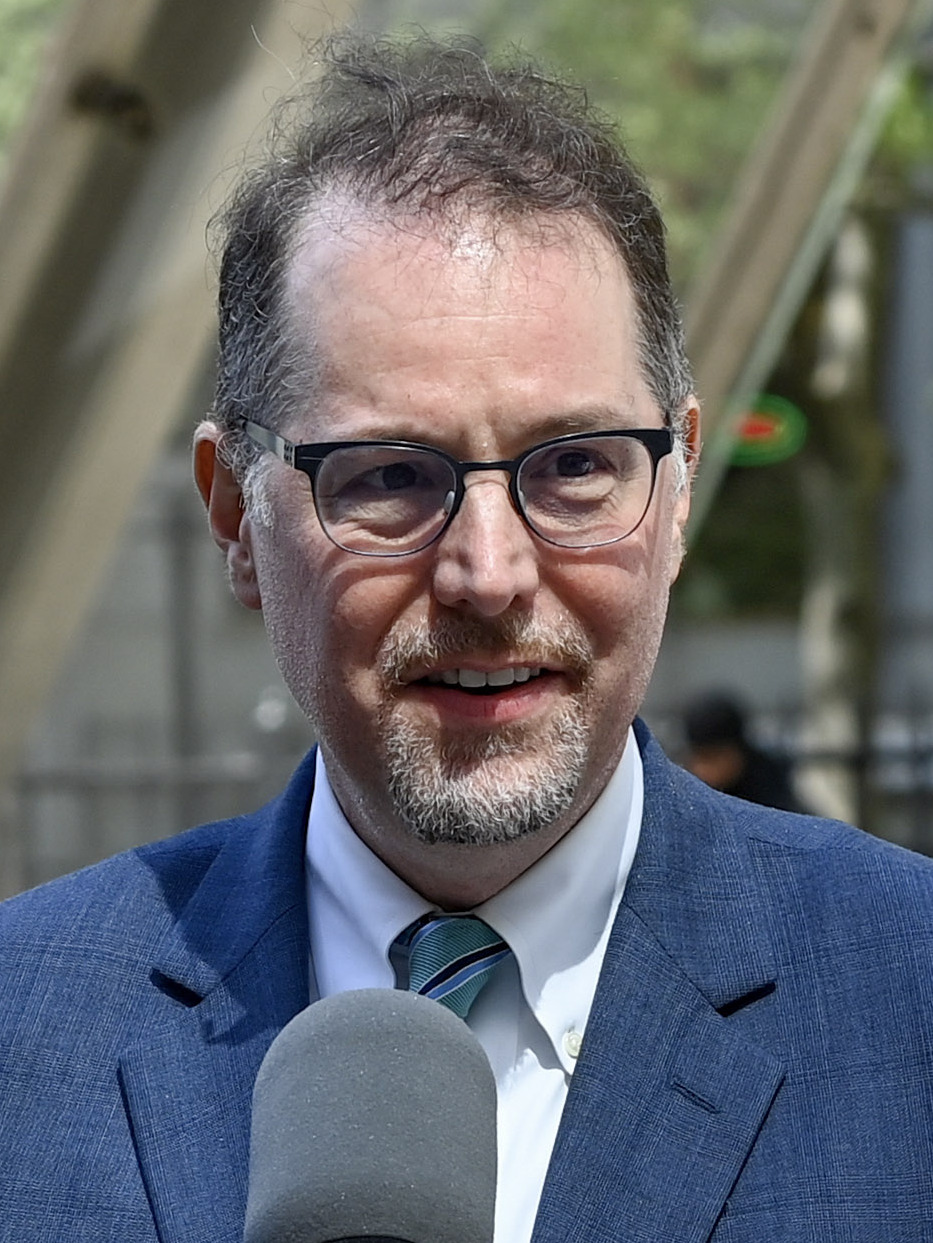
- Levine in 2023

46th Comptroller of New York City
- Incumbent
- Assumed office January 1, 2026
- Preceded by: Brad Lander

28th Borough President of Manhattan
- In office January 1, 2022 – December 31, 2025
- Preceded by: Gale Brewer
- Succeeded by: Brad Hoylman-Sigal

Member of the New York City Council from the 7th district
- In office January 1, 2014 – December 31, 2021
- Preceded by: Robert Jackson
- Succeeded by: Shaun Abreu

Personal details
- Born: April 30, 1969 (age 57) Chicago, Illinois, U.S.
- Party: Democratic
- Spouse: Ivelisse Suarez
- Children: 2
- Relatives: Asher Arian (cousin)
- Education: Haverford College (BS); Harvard University (MPP)
- Website: Official website

Mark D. Levine (born April 30, 1969) is an American politician and educator serving as the Comptroller of New York City since 2026. He previously served as the 28th Borough President of Manhattan from 2022 to 2025 and as member of the New York City Council from 2014 to 2021, where he represented the 7th district covering Manhattan neighborhoods of Morningside Heights, West Harlem, Washington Heights, and part of the Upper West Side.

== Early life and education ==
Born in Chicago, Illinois, Levine grew up in Columbia, Maryland. His early life was greatly influenced by the social activism of his parents, Marshal and Adele Levine. His cousin on his father's side, Asher Arian, was a prominent political scientist in Israel. Levine majored in physics at Haverford College and the University of Seville, Spain. He received a Masters in Public Policy from the John F. Kennedy School of Government at Harvard University in 1995. Levine speaks fluent Spanish and Hebrew.

== Career ==
Levine taught bilingual math and science at Junior High School 149 in the South Bronx from 1991 to 1993. He was a Teach For America corps member in the program’s early years.

In 1994 he founded Neighborhood Trust Federal Credit Union, a cooperatively-owned financial institution serving low-income families in the Washington Heights section of Northern Manhattan. Levine ran for the New York City Council in 2001, finishing second in a ten-way Democratic field.

In 2007 Levine was elected Democratic District Leader in the 71st Assembly District, Part A, representing parts of Hamilton Heights/West Harlem and Washington Heights. He was an early supporter of Barack Obama in the 2008 presidential primary, and ran on Obama’s delegate slate that year in New York’s 15th Congressional District. In 2009 Levine founded the Barack Obama Democratic Club of Upper Manhattan, a progressive, reform-oriented local political club.

In 2010 he ran for the New York State Senate in the 31st District. He finished second behind eventual general election winner Adriano Espaillat in a four-way Democratic primary race, with 38% of the vote.

== New York City Council ==
Levine took office in January, 2014. During his first term he served as chair of the City Council's Parks Committee, chair of the Council's Jewish Caucus, and founder and co-chair of the Council's Affordable Housing Preservation Taskforce.

Levine was lead sponsor of legislation passed in 2017 which established a right to counsel for low-income tenants facing eviction in housing court, making New York City the first place in the nation to grant such a right.

Other issues Levine has focused on include: construction of affordable housing, greater equity for parks in low-income neighborhoods, improved police-community relations, safer streets and expanded mass transit, dual-language education, historic preservation, expanded access to medical marijuana, and acceptance of bitcoin for payment of NYC fines and fees.

In addition to chairing the health committee, Levine was a member of the education, transportation, economic development, juvenile justice, and hospitals committees at the end of his term. He was also member of the Progressive Caucus and the Jewish Caucus.

In 2017, Levine won the Democratic primary to remain in his council seat with 75% of the vote over closest competitor Thomas Lopez-Pierre with 25%.

Levine was a candidate for City Council Speaker in 2017.

In his role as chair of the City Council's health committee, Levine gained wide attention during the 2020 coronavirus pandemic.

== Manhattan Borough President ==
Levine announced his candidacy for Manhattan borough president in January 2020. Levine was endorsed by Representatives Adriano Espaillat and Nydia Velázquez, among other elected officials, labor unions, and advocacy groups. He won the Democratic primary defeating New York State Senator Brad Hoylman by 7%, and defeated Republican Lou Puliafito in the November 2021 general election.

Levine took office on January 1, 2022.

Levine is a member of the Vote Blue Coalition, a progressive group and federal PAC created to support Democrats in New York, New Jersey, and Pennsylvania through voter outreach and mobilization efforts.

== New York City Comptroller ==
Following incumbent New York City Comptroller Brad Lander's decision to run the 2025 New York City Democratic mayoral primary, Levine opened a campaign account to run for comptroller. Politico declared him the winner of the Democratic primary on June 24, 2025.

Levine won the general election on November 4, 2025, and was sworn in as the 52nd New York City Comptroller on January 1, 2026. His office has committed to putting more than $4 billion of New York City's public pension funds towards the financing of affordable housing. It has also found that the New York City Department of Education failed to seek Medicaid reimbursement for at least $431 million of mandated special education services for public school students with disabilities over a span of roughly two years from mid-2023 to mid-2025, which combined with previous estimates made by the comptrollers' office under previous comptrollers would imply that at least $1.2 billion had not been recouped by the Department of Education since 2011. New York City Public Schools Chief Financial Officer Seritta Scott disputed the assessment, however, claiming that at least $232 million of the claimed $431 million figure was in fact ineligible for Medicaid reimbursement.

Levine broke a campaign promise when he announced in October 2026 that New York City would not purchase Israel Bonds. Levine said he made the decision for financial reasons, not political ones. His predecessor as comptroller, Brad Lander, decided not to renew the city’s pension funds’ investments in Israel Bonds in 2023. New York City Mayor Zohran Mamdani said he supports Levine’s decision. “We don't purchase the bonds of any other sovereign nation. I don't think we should make an exception when it comes to Israel,” Mamdani said.

== Election history ==
=== 2010 ===
New York State Senate, 31st District, Democratic Party primary election
Party	Candidate	Votes	%
Democratic	Adriano Espaillat	13,499	52.4
Democratic	Mark Levine	9,696	37.6
Democratic	Anna Lewis	1,942	7.5
Democratic	Miosotis Munoz	541	2.1
	Other	95	0.4

=== 2013 ===
2013 New York City Council election, District 7 Democratic primary election
Party	Candidate	Votes	%
Democratic	Mark Levine	7,454	41.4
Democratic	Joyce S. Johnson	3,108	17.3
Democratic	Luis Tejada	2,561	14.2
	Other (4)	3,511	19.4

2013 New York City Council election, District 7 general election
Party	Candidate	Votes	%
Democratic	Mark Levine	18,105	82.2
Working Families	Mark Levine	1,168	5.3
Total	Mark Levine	19,273	87.5
Green	Christina Gonzalez	1,700	7.7
	Others/Write-in	1,062	4.8

=== 2017 ===
2017 New York City Council election, District 7 Democratic primary election
Party	Candidate	Votes	%
Democratic	Mark Levine	9,286	74.1
Democratic	Thomas Lopez-Pierre	3,179	25.4
	Others (Write-in)	72	0.6

2017 New York City Council election, District 7 general election
Party	Candidate	Votes	%
Democratic	Mark Levine	21,314	95.1
Green	Florindo Troncelliti	1,097	4.9

=== 2021 ===
2021 Manhattan borough president election
Party	Candidate	Votes	%
Democratic	Mark Levine	223,248	84.98
Republican	Lou Puliafito	34,163	13.00
Libertarian	Michael Lewyn	4,874	1.85
Write-in		435	0.17
Total votes		262,720	100.00
Democratic hold			

=== 2025 ===
2025 New York City Democratic comptroller primary
Candidate	First round		Second round		Final round	
Candidate	Votes	%	Votes	%	Votes	%
Mark Levine	444,067	47.98%	444,482	48.14%	491,551	58.72%
Justin Brannan	308,637	33.35%	308,837	33.45%	345,628	41.28%
Ismail Perez	96,049	10.38%	96,259	10.43%	—	
Kevin Parker	73,322	7.92%	73,677	7.98%	—	
Write-ins	3,475	0.38%	—		—	
Total active votes	925,550	100.00%	923,255	100.00%	837,179	100.00%
Exhausted ballots	—		2,295	0.25%	86,076	9.32%

Political offices
Preceded by Gale Brewer	Borough President of Manhattan; 2022–2025	Succeeded by Brad Hoylman-Sigal
Preceded by Brad Lander	Comptroller of New York City; 2026–present	Incumbent
