= Edafe Okporo =

Nigerian-American author (born 1990)

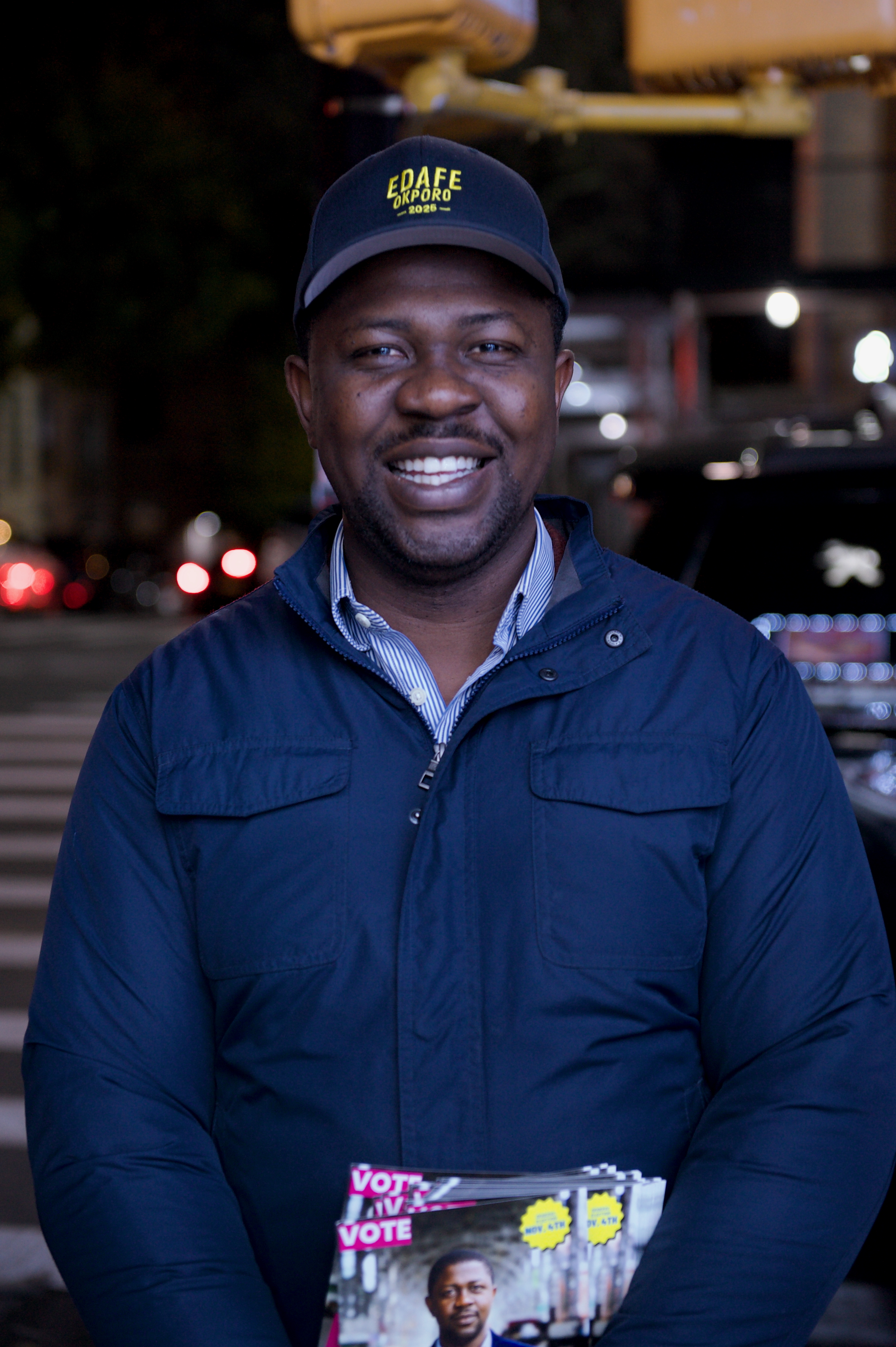
- Okporo canvassing on election day in 2025
- Born: Edafe Okporo; March 3, 1990 (age 36); Warri, Nigeria

Edafe Okporo (born March 3, 1990) is a Nigerian-American author. He is the Executive Director of Refuge America, an organization that helps to resettle LGBTQ+ asylum-seekers. Born in Warri, Nigeria, Okporo experienced violence in his home country because of his sexuality and was made to undergo conversion therapy. Okporo sought asylum in the United States after being attacked by a mob for advocating for healthcare access for gay men.

When Okporo arrived in the United States, he was held at an ICE detention center in Elizabeth, New Jersey for five months. After being granted asylum, Okporo became homeless, living at Newark Penn Station and at a shelter. Once he found stable housing, Okporo served as the first director of RDJ Refugee Shelter, New York City's first shelter for asylum-seekers. Okporo wrote a book, Asylum: A Memoir and Manifesto, detailing his experience seeking asylum in the United States.

Okporo ran for New York City Council District 7, and if elected, he would have been the first former asylum-seeker elected to that body. Edafe receive 24.8% of the vote in the Democratic primary and, running as an independent, received 4.7% of the vote in the general election. Okporo is a David Prize recipient.
