= James C. Jones =

American politician (1809–1859)

James Chamberlain Jones
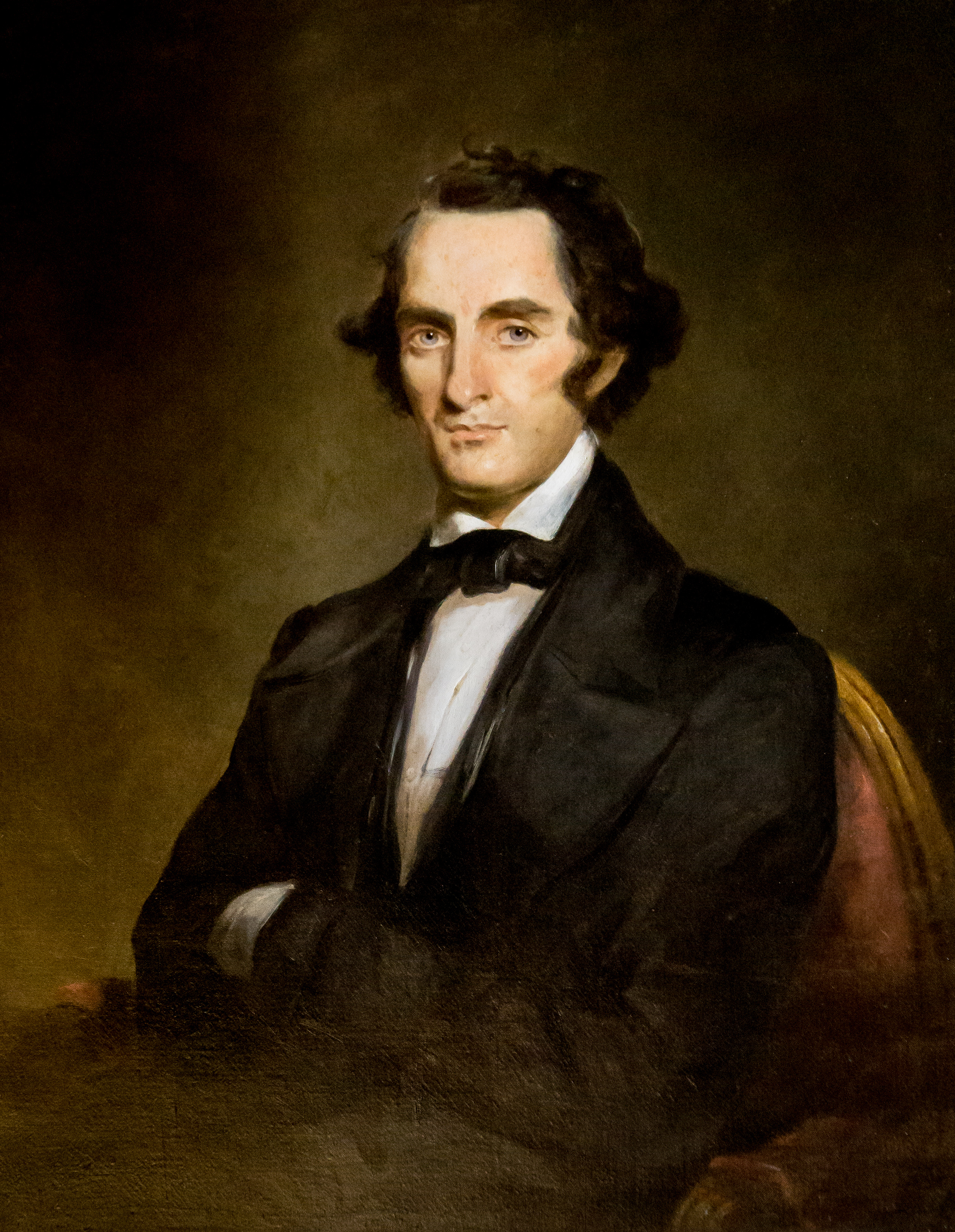

10th Governor of Tennessee
- In office October 15, 1841 – October 14, 1845
- Preceded by: James K. Polk
- Succeeded by: Aaron V. Brown

United States Senator from Tennessee
- In office March 4, 1851 – March 3, 1857
- Preceded by: Hopkins L. Turney
- Succeeded by: Andrew Johnson

Personal details
- Born: April 20, 1809 Davidson County, Tennessee, U.S.
- Died: October 29, 1859 (aged 50) Memphis, Tennessee, U.S.
- Resting place: Elmwood Cemetery; Memphis, Tennessee, U.S.
- Party: Whig (until 1854); Democrat (1854–1859)
- Spouse: Sarah Munford (m. 1829)
- Profession: Politician; farmer

James Chamberlain Jones (April 20, 1809 – October 29, 1859) was an American politician who served as the tenth governor of Tennessee from 1841 to 1845, and as a United States senator from Tennessee from 1851 to 1857. A Whig, Jones twice defeated future U.S. President James K. Polk for the governorship, in 1841 and 1843. He was the first native-born Tennessean to be elected governor of the state.

Jones's first gubernatorial term was marked by gridlock with the state senate, which was led by a group of Democratic senators known as the "Immortal Thirteen." His second term was more productive, as his fellow Whigs controlled both houses of the legislature. Though he later joined the Democratic Party, Jones's speaking skills and campaign style helped to solidify Tennessee's Whigs as one of the strongest Whig movements in the South.

== Early life ==
A thin man whose nickname was "Lean Jimmy" (he stood 6'2" but weighed only 125 pounds), Jones was born in Davidson County, Tennessee, the son of Peter and Catherine Chappell Jones. His parents died when he was still young, and he was raised by an uncle in Wilson County. He occasionally attended public schools. After marrying Sarah Munford in 1829, he purchased a farm near Lebanon, Tennessee.

In 1836, Jones supported the presidential campaign of Hugh Lawson White, a former Democrat who had turned against Andrew Jackson and joined the Whig Party. The following year, Jones was elected to the Tennessee House of Representatives, representing Wilson County. He was reelected in 1839. In 1840, Jones was an elector for presidential candidate William Henry Harrison. While in the legislature, Jones studied law, but never practiced.

== Governor ==
In 1841, the Tennessee Whigs nominated Jones as their candidate for governor. The Whigs believed that Jones, widely known as an entertaining speaker and storyteller, was their best shot to defeat incumbent governor, James K. Polk. After besting Polk in a series of debates in the Spring of 1841, Jones won the election by just 3,000 votes out of over 100,000 cast.

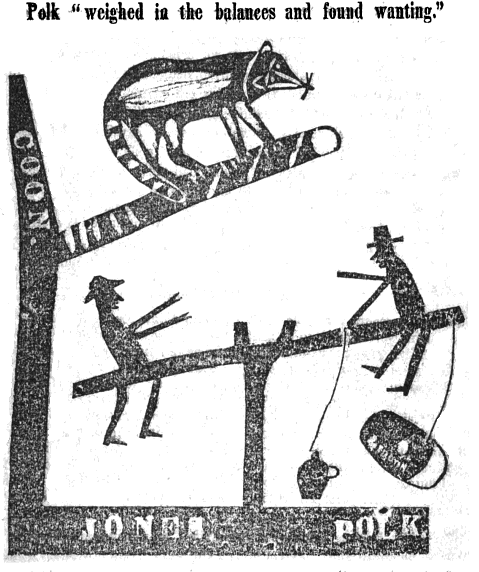
Image from William G. Brownlow's A Political Register praising Jones' victory in the 1843 election

Following the election of 1841, Whigs controlled the state House of Representatives, but Democrats held onto the state senate by a 13 to 12 margin. One of the first tasks of the new government was to fill the U.S. Senate seats left vacant by the resignations of Alexander O. Anderson and Alfred O. P. Nicholson. Democrats demanded one of the two seats go to a Democrat, a request the Whigs rejected. The 13 Democrats in the state senate, who became known as the "Immortal Thirteen," refused to allow a joint session of the legislature (where Whigs, who controlled the House, would have a numerical majority) to choose the replacement senators, and Tennessee thus had no representation in the U.S. Senate for most of 1842 and 1843. Though the government was mostly gridlocked by the Immortal Thirteen during Jones's first term, it did manage to enact debt reform legislation in 1842.

In the election of 1843, Polk canvassed the state extensively in hopes of taking back the governor's office, but he was again unsuccessful. Furthermore, Whigs gained control of the state senate, ending the "Immortal Thirteen" gridlock, and two Whigs were appointed to the state's U.S. Senate seats. Jones's second term saw the establishment of a state school for the blind in Nashville and a school for the deaf in Knoxville. In 1843, Nashville, which had been serving as the temporary capital of the state for years (as had several other places before it), was officially selected as the state's permanent capital. The cornerstone for the Tennessee State Capitol was laid while Jones was still governor.

== U.S. Senate and later life ==
Jones did not seek a third term, choosing instead to accept an offer to become president of the Memphis and Charleston Railroad. He was an elector for Zachary Taylor in the U.S. presidential election of 1848.

In 1851, the state legislature chose Jones to replace Hopkins L. Turney in the U.S. Senate. Jones supported Winfield Scott in the presidential election of 1852, but afterward began to drift apart from the Whig Party, which was imploding over the issue of slavery. In 1854, he railed against northern Whigs for refusing to support the Kansas-Nebraska Act. After the collapse of the Whig Party, Jones refused to join the American Party with other southern Whigs, and supported James Buchanan in the 1856 presidential election. He endorsed Stephen Douglas in the election of 1860.

After serving in the United States Senate, Jones retired to his farm near Memphis, where he died. He was interred in the city's Elmwood Cemetery.

== See also ==
- List of governors of Tennessee

Party political offices
Preceded by Newton Cannon	Whig nominee for Governor of Tennessee; 1841, 1843	Succeeded by Ephraim H. Foster
Political offices
Preceded by James K. Polk	Governor of Tennessee; 1841–1845	Succeeded by Aaron V. Brown
U.S. Senate
Preceded by Hopkins L. Turney	Senator from Tennessee (Class 1); 1851–1857; Served alongside: John Bell	Succeeded by Andrew Johnson
