= West Harlem Art Fund =

Public art and preservation organization

Coordinates: 40.814257°N 73.955546°W

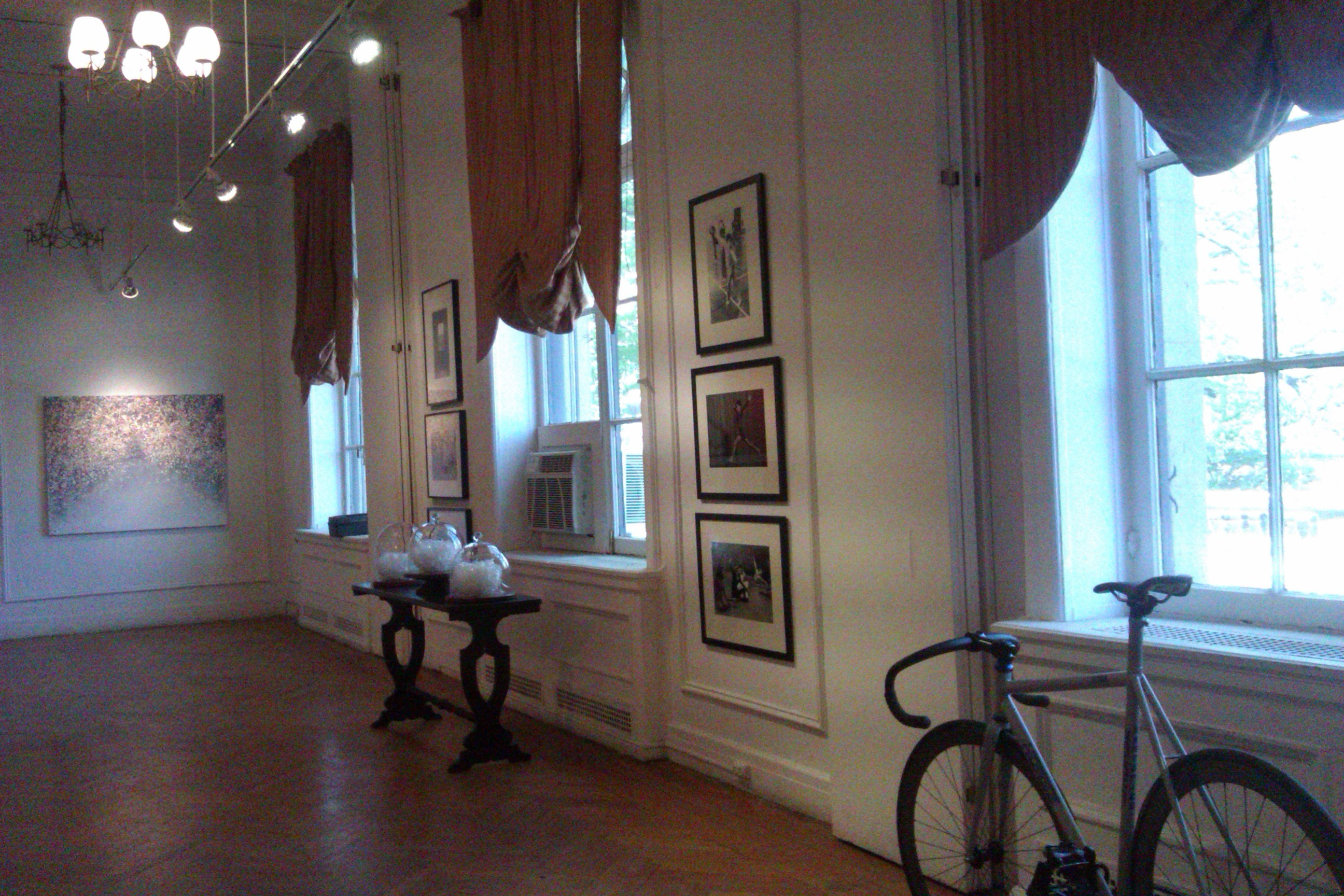
Exhibition at the Andrew Freedman Mansion

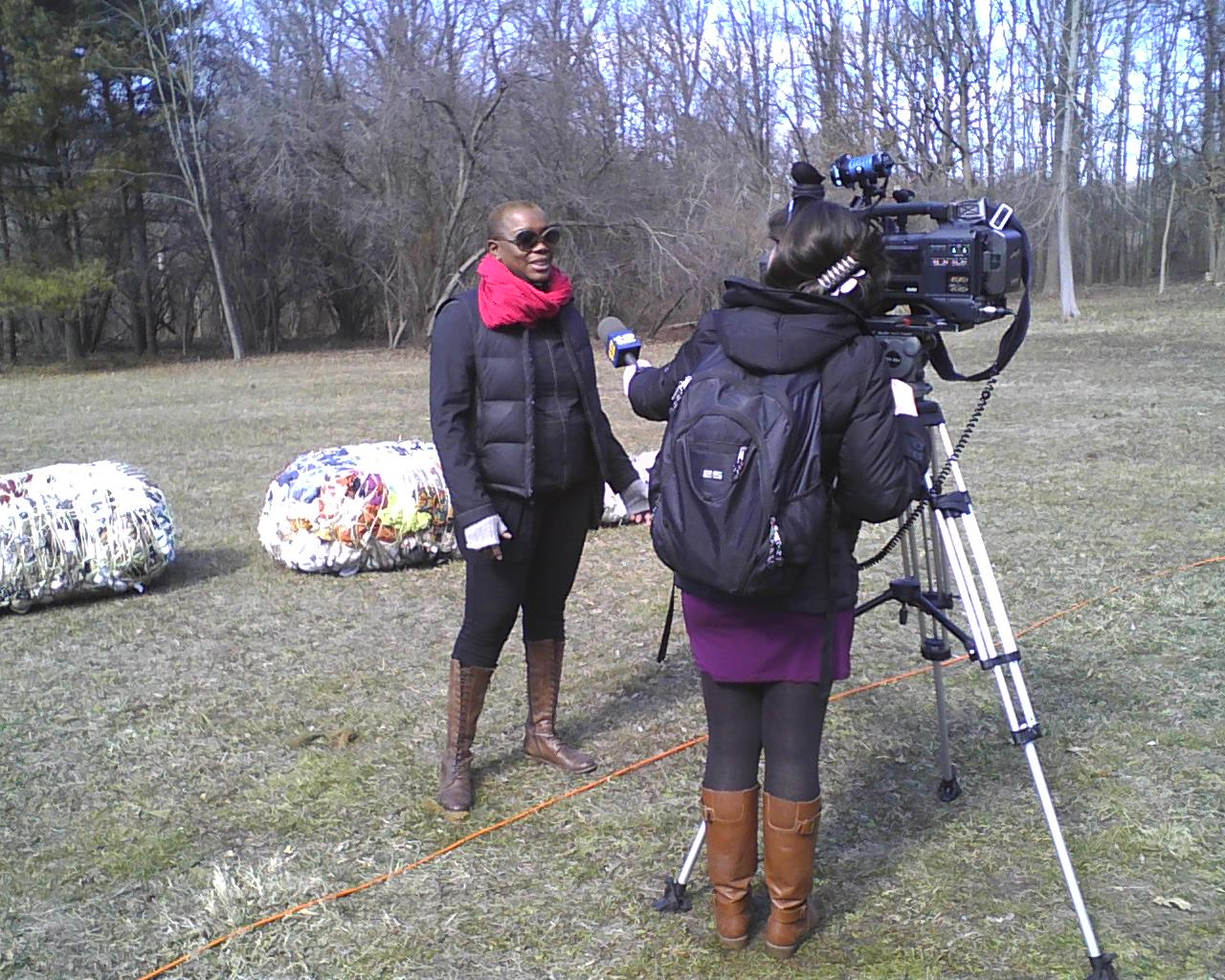
Artist Dianne Smith being interviewed in front of her public art installation at Bartow-Pell Mansion

The West Harlem Art Fund, Inc. is a public art and media organization based in the City of New York, founded in 1998. Savona Bailey-McClain is its Executive Director and Chief Curator.

== Scope of activities ==
The West Harlem Art Fund, Inc. provides exhibition opportunities to artists and creative professionals in public spaces located in Upper Manhattan. The organization is also involved in projects related to historical and cultural heritage and supports community involvement in local development. Its organizational symbol is the double crocodile from West Africa, which is (one of the Adinkra symbols). The term Funtunmmireku-Denkyemmirreku, which means unity in diversity, represents the organization's values. The West Harlem Art Fund, Inc. offers various forms of public art, including traditional exhibitions, photo installations, windows, digital and live performances, which can be commissioned or through agency programs. The organization is committed to promoting art in public parks and open spaces throughout New York City. It also advocates for better maintenance, lighting, and landscaping for parks to local city and state officials.

== History ==
The West Harlem Art Fund is an organization that has exhibited outdoor installations in various locations for many years. The organization's first installation, "Three Men Walking," was held in May 2003 and featured Kirsten Campbell's work, "Moving Beyond," in Historic St. Nicholas Park. Despite facing skepticism and negative stereotypes, the success of this exhibition helped the organization to produce more outdoor installations. Over time, the West Harlem Art Fund has exhibited in all four historic Harlem Parks, smaller parks, lobby spaces, sidewalks, storefronts in Harlem, as well as in Times Square, DUMBO, Governors Island, Queens, Bronx, and Lower Manhattan. Alongside these exhibitions, the organization has also produced concerts, historical re-enactments, theatrical and storytelling events. A diverse range of artists have been featured, including Barbara Siegel, Luisa Caldwell, Robert Hickman, Florencio Gelabert, Sandor Camille, Julio Valdez, Queen Esther, Jann Parker, Patrick Singh, Dianne Smith, Nora Mae Carmichael, Richard Gonzalez, Sai Morikawa, Scherezade García, Iliana Emilia Garcia, Ellen Maynard, Kiki Smith, Vicki DaSilva, Kyuseok Oh, and Bentley Meeker.

Between 2005 and 2008, a project known as "Take Me to the River" was launched, with the goal of improving waterfront access and facilities for the West Harlem, Manhattan community along the Hudson River. The project was funded through the New York State Environmental Protection Fund, which was administered by the New York Department of State, Division of Coastal Resources, and the Office of the Manhattan Borough President. Phase I and II of the project raised a total of $550,000, which in turn led to an additional $40 million in funding from the City of New York for capital improvements that began in 2010. The improvements include new playing fields and picnic areas from 145th to 155th Streets, as well as a future public art walk.

During the fall of 2008, the West Harlem Art Fund collaborated with Vantage Properties to establish storefront installations and a temporary boutique in vacant commercial spaces along Broadway in West Harlem and Washington Heights. These installations provided a platform for emerging fashion designers to showcase their work for a limited period and brought a sense of hope to local community residents during a challenging period in the nation's history.

In 2009, the West Harlem Art Fund made a decision to further explore the concept of "pop-up" installations. The organization collaborated with Transportation Alternatives for NYC Park(ING) Day and produced multiple installations in different areas of the city. Furthermore, the West Harlem Art Fund formed a partnership with the Humanities & Art Division at The City College of New York to co-sponsor public art installations on an annual basis at St. Nicholas Park, a historically significant location, starting in 2010.

In 2010, the West Harlem Art Fund, Inc. partnered with the MFA program at the City College of New York, the City University of New York to present the exhibition In Dialogue featuring the works of artists Marcie Revens and Scherezade Garcia in historic St. Nicholas Park. The organization also featured an installation called Ghost Net by the organization Trash Patch at the Tapestry Building in East Harlem during the summer. The timing of the Ghost Net installation was significant as it coincided with the discovery of an Atlantic trash patch and the BP Gulf oil spill off the coast of Louisiana. The Ghost Net installation offered the public an opportunity to envision what a real trash patch would look like underwater.

In March 2011, a public art exhibition was held in the heart of Times Square, featuring the Counting Sheep installation, created by Kyu Seok Oh. The West Harlem Art Fund, in partnership with the Times Square Alliance and the Armory Show, organized and presented the exhibition. Counting Sheep was the first outdoor paper sculpture installation in New York City and attracted a significant number of viewers and visitors between 45th and 46th Street and Broadway.

In 2012, an organization was chosen to create a public art installation for the Affordable Art Fair in Chelsea, which featured the work of Dominican artist Iliana Emilia Garcia. In 2013, the organization produced two shows in the Bronx at Bartow-Pell Mansion and at the Andrew Freedman Home on the Grand Concourse. Later that year, the organization collaborated with New York Restoration Project to produce the public art series Playlab, which was held in four gardens in East Harlem. In 2014, the organization curated The H in Harlem, an installation by premier lighting designer Bentley Meeker, and the intervention series Under the Viaduct, which included works by various artists such as Vicki DaSilva, Peter Rogina, Cynthia Rudin, Henry Gwiadzu, Jonas Nilsson, Eva Olson, Carlton Bright, Eileen Cohen, Lady K Fever, choreographer Ellen Maynard, and digital students from New York University's ITP Program and Columbia University Sound Art Program.

== List of exhibitions ==
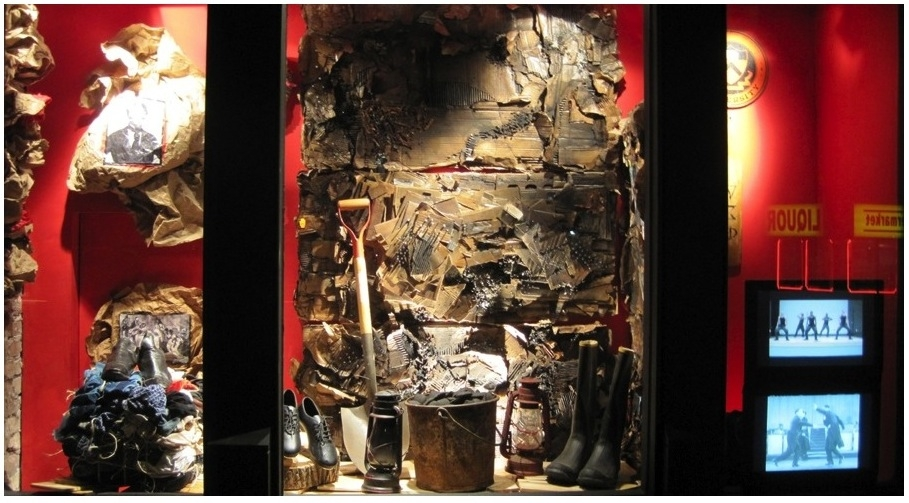
Gumboot Juba window installation created by Dianne Smith for the West Harlem Art Fund at the Mink Building

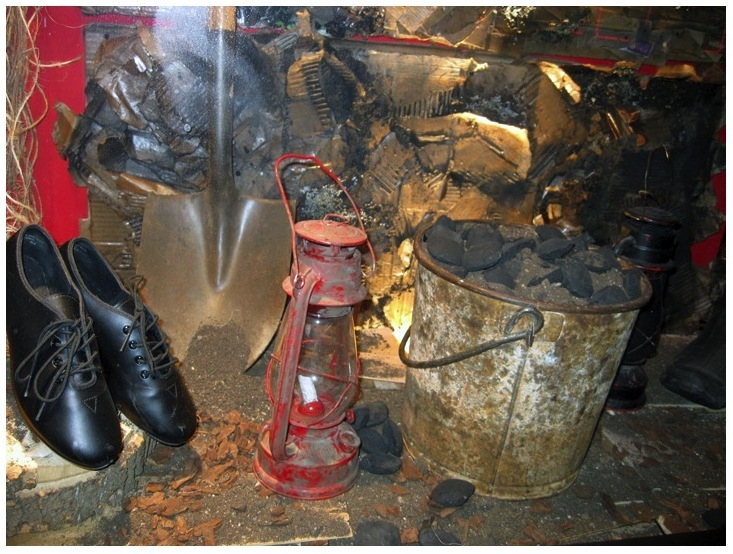
Side view of Gumboot Juba window installation created by Smith for the West Harlem Art Fund at the Mink Building

- Counting Sheep 2011
- Gumboot Juba 2011
- Story Piles 2012
- Brimming on the Edge 2013
- The H in Harlem 2014
- Under the Viaduct 2014
- East River Flows 2014/2015

== Additional references ==
- "Artist Renders East River Flows in Light Graffiti". artnet News. 1 August 2014.
- "Under the Viaduct: Intervention Series curated by Savona Bailey-McClain and the West Harlem Art Fund". artdaily.com.
- "Bentley Meeker Brings Harlem Bling to the Hudson with Giant "H"". News.artnet.com. 25 June 2014.
- "Lighting Up the "Last Real Slice of New York" in West Harlem". Bbook.com. 25 June 2014.
- "For NYCxDesign Week, REPURPOSE Brings 'Light Graffiti' to West Harlem". Untapped Cities. 8 May 2014.
- "Light Show Under Harlem Viaduct Hopes to Brighten Local Arts Scene – West Harlem – DNAinfo.com New York". 2 April 2015. Archived from the original on 2 April 2015.
- SAMUELS, TANYANIKA. "Latest exhibit at Andrew Freedman Home marries art, design and technology; also includes artsy skatepark". Nydailynews.com.
- "The Andrew Freedman House in the Bronx". Untapped Cities. 28 May 2013.
- "New Art Exhibit at the Andrew Freedman House". Thebronxsocialite.com. 1 May 2013.
- SAMUELS, TANYANIKA. "Borough artists to showcase best of Bronx talent at 2nd annual Bronx Day event at Armory Show 2013". Nydailynews.com.
- "You can afford these stories at the tunnerl [sic] this October by the West Harlem Art Fund". Artdaily.com. Archived from the original on 2014-03-05.
- "Inspired by geek speak, art makes sense of fractured system". The Villager. 6 July 2011.
- "West Harlem Art Fund Showcases Exhibit on Governors Island – Harlem – DNAinfo.com New York". 16 May 2013. Archived from the original on 16 May 2013.
- "Red Dot Art Fair Announce its Return to New York City in Newly Renovated Event Space". Artdaily.com.
- "Times Square Alliance Presents a Major Public Art Exhibition at the Crossroads of the World". Artdaily.com.
- "Times Square Is Full of Sheep". Villagevoice.com. March 2011. Archived from the original on September 13, 2018.
- Miller, Kirsten (2 March 2011). "Bank St. Irregular: Counting Sheep in Times Square". Kirstenmillerbooks.blogspot.com.
- "New York Photos of the Week February 25th – March 4th". Blogs.wsj.com. 4 March 2011.
- "Sheep to Accompany Herds of Tourists in Times Square – Midtown & Theater District – DNAinfo.com New York". 2 August 2014. Archived from the original on 2 August 2014.
- "Photography". Los Angeles Times.
- "New York City Business News & Events – Announcements & Events in New York City – NearSay". nearsay.com.
- "Park(ing) Day reclaims street spaces". Columbia Daily Spectator.
- Williams, Timothy (22 October 2006). "North and South Don't Share the Same View on Conditions at One Manhattan Park". The New York Times.
