= Mink Building =

Coordinates: 40.8142°N 73.9556°W

- Interactive map of the Mink Building area

General information
- Architectural style: Romanesque Revival
- Location: 1361 Amsterdam Avenue, New York, New York, United States
- Completed: 1889

Technical details
- Floor count: 5

Design and construction
- Architect: Frederick Henninger

The Mink Building is a five-story German-American style red brick structure at 1361-1369 Amsterdam Avenue between 126th and 128th Streets, in the Manhattanville neighborhood of Manhattan, New York City, originally part of a large brewery complex. It is one of a few buildings that remain of a vast beer brewing industry in this area in the late 19th century, beer brewing was an industry as big as finance or real estate in the 21st century New York City. The site of the complex at 1361 Amsterdam Avenue in Manhattan - predating residential development in Harlem - was chosen due to its relative isolation at the time.

== History ==
=== Brewery ===
Beginning in the 1830s, German immigrants brought to New York a brewery tradition which ultimately triumphed, and by 1880, Yorkville, the Lower East Side, Williamsburg and Bushwick, all had become home to large populations of German immigrants, and also home to more than a hundred breweries.

The Mink Building site has variously housed the following breweries: Casper Heindel, Manhattan Brewery (10th Avenue & 128th Street); 1865-1870 William Maack, Manhattan Brewery 1870–1875; Yuengling & Co., Manhattan Brewery 1875–1880; D. G. Vuengling, Jr., Manhattan Brewery 1880–1884; D. G. Yuengling Brewing Co. 1884–1897; John F. Betz, Manhattan Brewery (Amsterdam Avenue & 128th Street) 1897–1901; Betz & Sons Brewing Co. of New York City; Manhattan Brewery 1901–1903; and the Bernheimer & Schwartz, Pilsener Brewing Co.; readdressed to 127th to 129th & Amsterdam in 1903–1920, after which brewery operations were shut down by National Prohibition.

The property was originally part of the Excelsior Brewery, followed by the Manhattan Brewery. While the Betz Brewery was operating, so was the Lion Brewery, owned by Max E. Bernheimer and his brother Simon, along with partners August Schmid and Anton Schwartz (April 23, 1853 – November 6, 1910). Both the Betz Brewery and the Lion were extremely successful. In 1875, David G. Yuengling, Jr. purchased the property in the dense, industrial enclave in the deep valley between Morningside and Hamilton Heights near the Hudson River. Nearby was the D. F. Tiemann pigment factory, a worsted mill. and the first buildings of Manhattan College. The following year, in 1876, The New York Times reported Yuengling Brewery "establishment, whose structures make up a small town . . . now has equipment which comprises all the latest ideas in brewing science". It drew its pure water from artesian wells on the property, which the newspaper said were "of unlimited capacity". The giant red-brick brewery included a swimming pool and opulent parlors for entertaining dignitaries, who included King Edward VII of England. On August 7, 1903, the New York Tribune reported the sale of the property to J. F. Betz Brewery, "which is considered one of the best brewery plants in equipment and one of the largest in size in this country". The complex included a single-span bridge over and across West 128th Street.

It would be two years before the site for the Bernheimer & Schwartz Pilsener brewery complex was completed. The malt house complex featured on a lithographic calendar in 1914 shows the complex in its heyday. The Bernheimer & Schwartz Pilsener Brewing Company was extremely successful. The members of the Bernheimer family directly involved in the brewery company, Simon Emanuel Bernheimer (1849-1911), and Max E. Bernheimer (1855-1913); both Bernheimer brothers died suddenly.

In July 1923, The New York Times reported, A flood of prewar beer was let loose into Harlem sewers yesterday when Federal prohibition officers began the destruction of 836,000 gallons of non-de-alcoholized lager and 4,000 barrels of twelve-year-old ale at the plant of the Bernheimer Schwartz Pilsener Brewing Company, 128th Street and Amsterdam Avenue.

=== Later years ===
During prohibition, the complex was adapted for use by several businesses, including dairy, cold storage, and laundry. Most of the complex returned to brewery use for the Horton's Pilsner Brewing Company in the 1930s. 423-427 West 127th Street was constructed in 1934-1936 and Horton went out of business in 1941.

The Mink Building eventually became in the 1940s. the site of Interborough Fur Storage Company, a storage facility where the wealthy stored their furs for the summer before becoming office space in the late 1990s. Of the two brewery complexes that remain on Manhattan island, 1361 Amsterdam Avenue is part of a malt house complex considered the finest — with ethnic German architectural motifs — and the most complete.

The property was calendared for consideration as a historic landmark in the 1990s. In 2011, Manhattan Community Board 9 tried to put an end to the standoff between preservationists and developers last week, by voting overwhelmingly to remove the building from consideration as a historic landmark. Current building owner Janus Property Company and Cushman and Wakefield lease approximately 137,000 square feet (12,700 m^{2}) of space to commercial, nonprofit, and civic tenants. Janus is redeveloping the area around 126th and Amsterdam as part of the Manhattanville Factory District, and as part of the development, the Mink Building is being converted into affordable housing and high-tech office space.

== Architect ==
Louis Oberlein, an architect working at the turn of the 20th century designed 1361 Amsterdam Avenue, possibly along with partner, Anthony Pfuend. A reminder of the period when brewing was a major industry in New York, this complex of buildings is the larger, more architecturally distinguished and intact of the two groups of brewery buildings surviving in Manhattan. The buildings were designed mostly in the American Round Arch style popular for industrial buildings at the time.

Oberlein was originally employed by a firm called Lederle, Wessely & Company, which designed a building at 196 Broadway that has since been demolished. Oberlein started his own practice sometime after he was commissioned to design the Bernheimer & Schwartz Pilsener Brewing Company, the complex which included the Mink Building. The architect designed not only the brewery but also surrounding buildings that met the company's other needs. Records indicate that Oberlein worked primarily for Bernheimer & Schwartz, although he designed the Mt. Kisco Brewing Company and a stock house, which still stands today at 37th Street and 1st Avenue in Manhattan.

A review of the Mink building, as well as the stock house in mid-town, shows that Oberlein was skilled in the German-American style of building, perhaps contributing to his popularity with brewers. Bernheimer & Schwartz wanted their building to advertise their business, and so Oberlein was able to use German building characteristics to achieve this. This largely consisted of the decorative brick patterns found on the façade of the Mink Building. There is also usually an emphasis on floors, windows, and verticality in German-American architecture, all traits that Oberlein used to distinguish his buildings as German.

== Site and design ==
The Mink Building is located in northern Manhattan, adjacent to the Hudson River, in Manhattanville. This settlement was initially part of the Dutch settlement of Harlem. Even after New York became a British colony and then a state, this area maintained its status as a crossroads.

The form of the Mink Building derives largely from its original use as a brewery owned by German-Americans, and especially from its architect, Louis Oberlein. The Mink Building contains concrete slab floors supported by interior columns and load bearing masonry exterior walls. The floor slabs are visible on the façade as stylistic elements. Concrete is used to supplement the brick elsewhere on the façade, and reveals places of structural significance, such as the upper corners of the windows.

== Public art ==
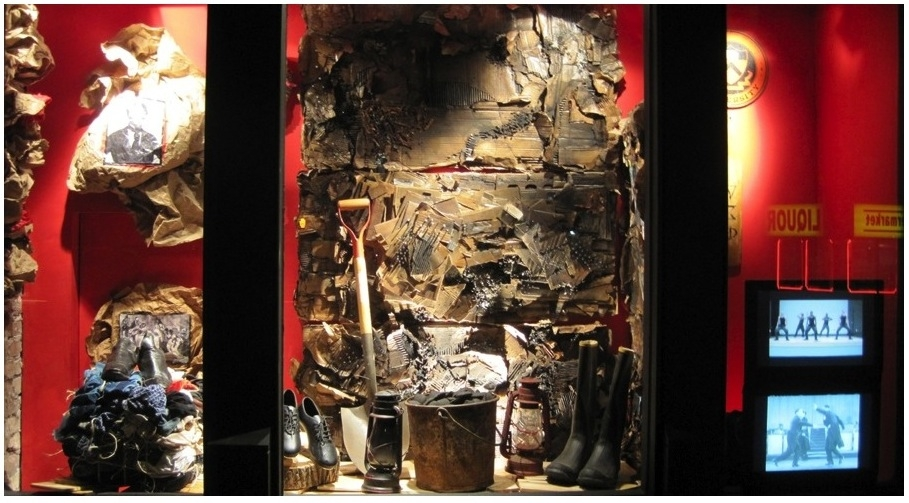
Gumboot Juba window installation created by Dianne Smith for the West Harlem Art Fund at the Mink Building

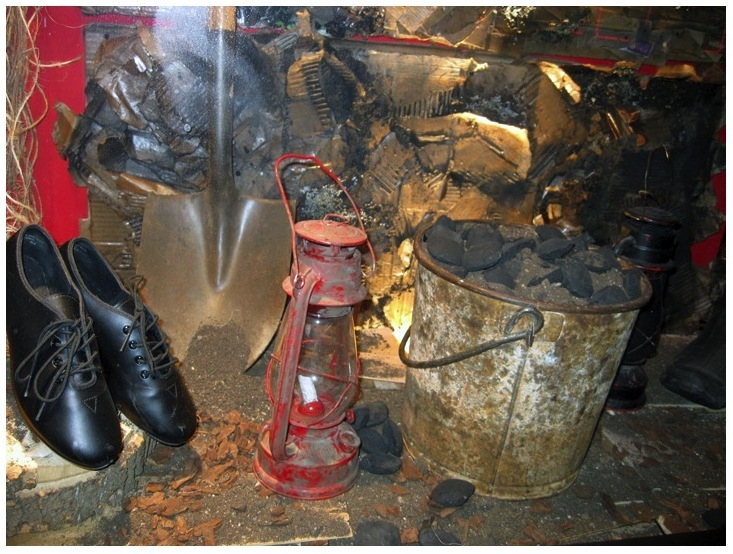
Side view of Gumboot Juba window installation created by Dianne Smith for the West Harlem Art Fund at the Mink Building

The West Harlem Art Fund produced two window installations at the Mink Building located on Amsterdam Avenue. The first work was a group installation and the second installation was created by Harlem-based artist Dianne Smith called Gumboot Juba that was featured in 2011 during Armory Arts Week.
