= Savona Bailey-McClain =

American community organizer

Savona Bailey-McClain is an American community organizer and art producer, and the director of the West Harlem Art Fund. She has curated or organized exhibitions by Vicki DaSilva, Bentley Meeker, and Tomo Mori. She has also spoken at the Silicon Harlem Technology Conference, and organized part of the NYCxDESIGN festival. Outside of art, she is the head of West Harlem Food and Beverage, a merchants association in Harlem, and served as a member of New York's Community Board 9.
