= Rebbetzin =

Wife of a rabbi

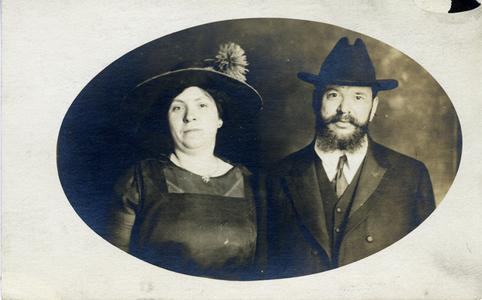
Rabbi Simon Glazer and his wife, Rebbetzin Ida Glazer (née Cantor), 1917

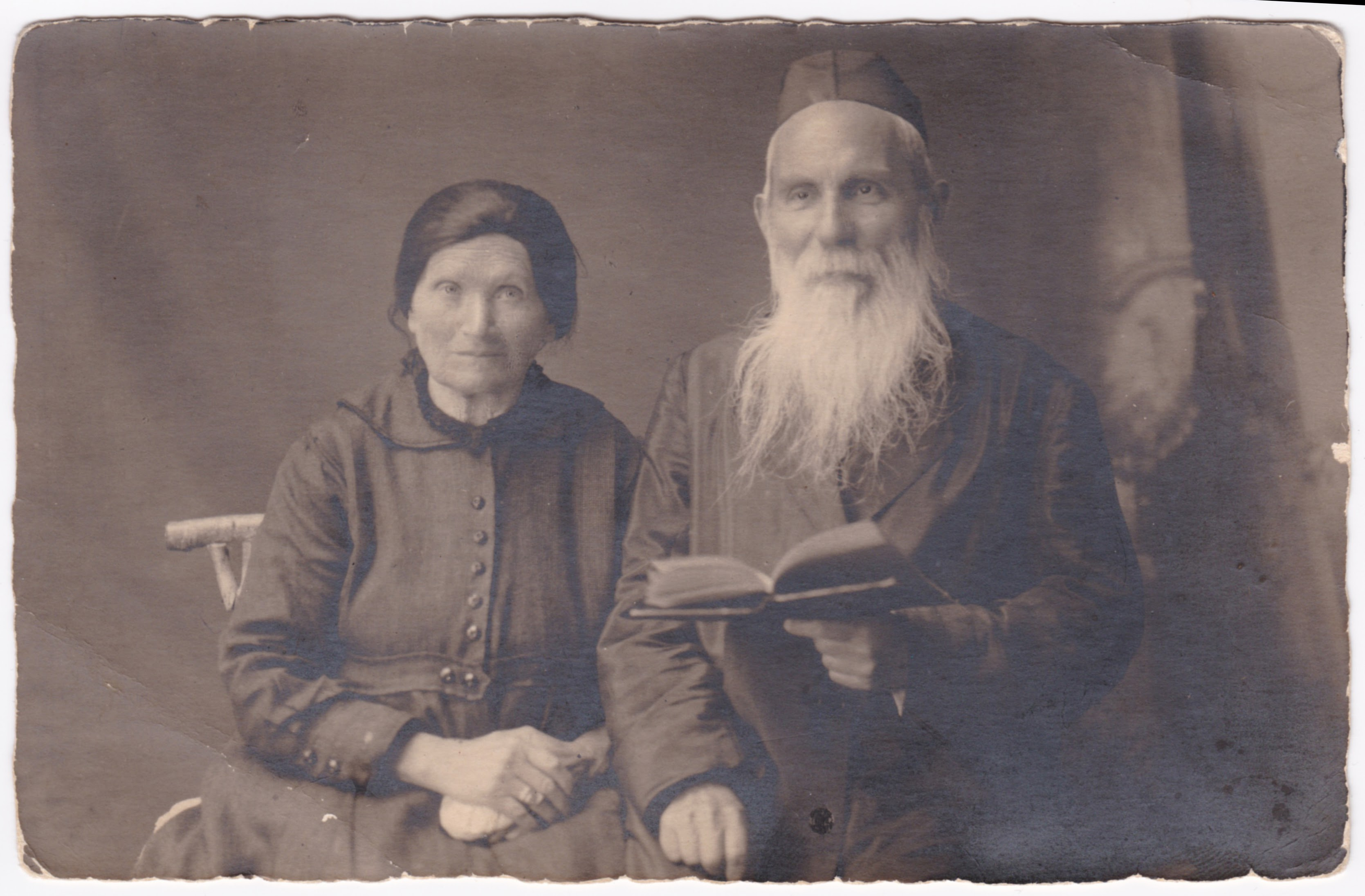
Rabbi Nosson Tzvi Finkel with his wife, Rebbetzin Gittel Finkel

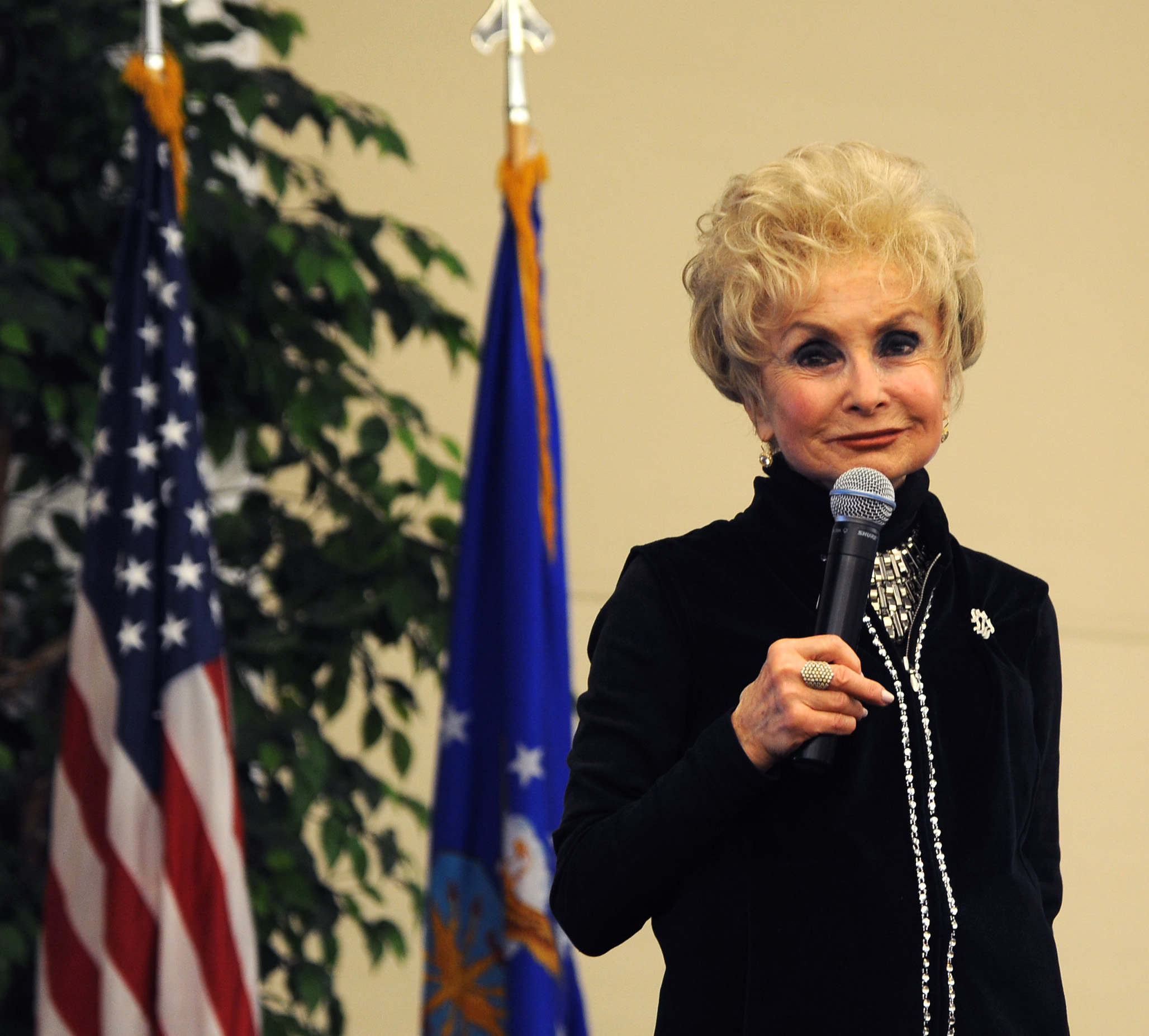
Rebbetzin Esther Jungreis

Rebbetzin (Yiddish: רביצין) or Rabbanit (Hebrew: רַבָּנִית) is the title used for the wife of a rabbi—typically among Orthodox, Haredi, and Hasidic Jews—or for a female Torah scholar or teacher.

== Etymology ==
The Yiddish word has a trilingual etymology: Hebrew, רבי rabbí ("my master"); the Slavic feminine suffix, -ица (-itsa); and the Yiddish feminine suffix, ין- -in.

== Community roles ==
In many Orthodox communities, rebbetzins have the role of spiritual counselors. In circles such as the Hasidic dynasty of Belz, the girls schools are run by the rebbetzin.

The rabbi's wife plays an important community role, especially in small communities. In many ways, she is called on to be as knowledgeable as the rabbi in the realm of woman's observances: In this manner, for something that does not require a psak (ruling), she can be approached when a woman does not feel comfortable approaching the rabbi, or where the rabbi maybe should not be approached. For instance, the rebbetzin may be consulted in personal questions regarding female sexuality.

When a rabbi is a "pulpit rabbi" (versus a teacher or a "lay rabbi"), his rebbetzin may become something of a "first lady" of the community, performing social tasks and ceremonial roles.

With the growth of independent leadership roles among Orthodox women, some women have received the title on their own merit, irrespective of their husbands.

== See also ==
- Women in Judaism
- Women rabbis
