= Carolyn Kent =

American historical preservationist and activist

- Born: Carolyn Wade Cassady Kent; July 20, 1935; Rochester, New York
- Died: August 22, 2009 (aged 74); New York, New York United States
- Citizenship: United States
- Education: Sarah Lawrence College, Oxford University, Columbia University
- Occupations: Historical preservationist and activist
- Organization(s): Manhattan Community Board 9, Parks and Landmarks Committee (founder), Morningside Heights Historic District Committee (co-founder). Renaissance English Text Society (Secretary)
- Spouse: Edward Miles Allen Kent (1957–2009)
- Children: Cassady Kent (son), Hannah Kent (daughter), Sarah Kent (daughter)
- Parent(s): Louise Virginia Sale, Maynard Lamar Cassady
- Awards: Preservation Angel Award 2007 (first recipient)

Carolyn Wade Cassady Kent (July 20, 1935 – August 22, 2009) was an American historical preservationist and activist who lived most of her life in New York City on Riverside Drive, one block west of her alma mater Columbia University. As founder of Manhattan Community Board 9's Parks and Landmarks Committee and co-founder of the Morningside Heights Historic District Committee she worked to advocate for the architectures and communities of Morningside Heights, Manhattanville and Hamilton Heights in close collaboration with community, city and state organizations and agencies, to effect landmark designations, restorations and interventions that have preserved and protected buildings and entire neighborhoods. In 2007, she was given the first Preservation Angel Award. In addition, Kent served as Secretary of the Renaissance English Text Society.

== Early life and family background ==
"Lyn" was born in Rochester, New York, where her father, Maynard Lamar Cassady, was teaching religion at the University. Maynard was an ordained minister who had obtained his theology degree at Princeton. He met Lyn's mother, Louise Virginia Sale, at William and Mary where she had been one of his students. Louise was the last of seven children of one of Virginia's so called First Families located in Fairfield, Virginia. Instead of leading a conventional existence, she became, with her husband, an active civil rights worker, a tradition which she passed on to her children. Maynard died relatively young while teaching at Crozier Theological Seminary where Martin Luther King Jr. was at that time a student. His three daughters, Carolyn, Elizabeth, and Anne, of which only Lyn was barely a teen, were left with their mother who moved to Kalamazoo, Michigan as Dean of Women at Kalamazoo College. Louise later married Charles Johnson, pastor of First Presbyterian Church there.

== Education ==
Kent graduated from Sarah Lawrence College in 1957, where she was editor of the newspaper and president of the student body. After graduation she spent a year at Oxford where she was a recognized student working with Catherine Ing. She then began studies at Columbia University under Marjorie Nicolson in 17th Century English literature and completed her Masters with high honors and doctoral orals with "distinction".

== Preamble to activism ==
While making a home in Morningside Heights and raising three children, Kent began a dissertation on the printing press's impact on English Renaissance Poetry. This called her attention to the decorative printing ornaments embellishing turn-of-century Morningside Heights, and a preservation battle centering on her building, The Paterno, drew her into the New York City historic preservation effort. Through book history and editorial theory she had "explored the implications of authorial intention which then translated to a respect for the architect's intention and a belief that historic preservation based on this is critical to a culture's integrity and strength." C. Kent

== Professional life ==
As founder, in 1990, of Manhattan Community Board 9's Parks and Landmarks Committee and co-founder in 1996 with Assemblyman Daniel O'Donnell of the Morningside Heights Historic District Committee, designations under her watch included Hamilton Heights/ Sugar Hill Historic District, Hamilton Heights Historic District Extension, The Riverside Church, Hamilton Theater and Lobby Building, and the Plant and Scrymser Pavilions of St. Luke's Hospital. Restorations included moving the home of Alexander Hamilton, the Hamilton Grange, to St. Nicholas Park; and the return of windowed walls to the 125th St. elevated subway station. Interventions included winning "disapproval" from the Landmarks Preservation Commission of a Certificate of Appropriateness for exterior changes to the designated Casa Italiana on the Columbia University Campus; and a "disapproval" by the NY City Council of the LPC's Cathedral of St. John the Divine designation because it opened the historic Close to unregulated development. (For more detail about any the above see the sub-titles below)

Attending to preservation duties around town,

"...a looming Mrs. Kent [she stood 6 feet tall] appeared always with an innate regal dignity. She was an amateur in the positive sense ... and a civic activist in the same tradition as Jane Jacobs and Jacqueline Kennedy Onassis. For all her elite early-American ancestry, enhanced by a first-class education at Sarah Lawrence and Oxford, along with her cultivated patrician-sounding voice, so old-fashioned that it's a type seldom encountered today, not outside of the Broadway stage, Carolyn was, ironically, the very quintessence of nonconformity."
– Harlem historian, Michael Henry Adams

=== Collaborators in preservation advance ===
During her career, Kent worked in close collaboration with: Manhattan Community Board 9, NYC Department of Parks and Recreation, Sugar Hill Preservation Committee, 5-Block Protection Association, Upper Manhattan Society for Progress through Preservation, Hamilton Heights/West Harlem Community Preservation Organization, Manhattan-Ville Heritage Society, Morningside Heights Residents Association, and Morningside Heights Historic District Committee.

=== Designated Landmarks ===
- Fire Engine Company No. 47, 500 W. 113th St.; (1889–90) Napoleon LeBrun. Designated June 17, 1997. LP 1962
- Hamilton Theater and Lobby Building, 3560–3568 Broadway; (1912–13) Thomas Lamb, designated February 8, 2000 LP 2052
- Hamilton Heights Historic District Extension, designated March 28, 2000 LP 2044
- Croton Aqueduct 119th St. Gatehouse, 432–434 W. 119th St., George Birdsall, NYC Dept. of Public Works, designated March 28, 2000 LP 2051
- Hamilton Heights/Sugar Hill Historic District, designated June 27, 2000 LP 2064
- Hamilton Heights/ Sugar Hill Historic Extension, Oct. 23, 2001 LP 2103
- Hamilton Heights/Sugar Hill Historic District Northeast, Oct. 23, 2001, LP 2104
- Hamilton Heights/Sugar Hill Historic District Northwest, June 18, 2002, LP 2105
- The Riverside Church, 490–498 Riverside Drive; (1928–1930) Henry C. Pelton with Allen & Collens, designated May 16, 2000 LP 2037
- Plant and Scrymser Pavilions, St. Luke's Hospital, 401 W. 113th St. and 400 W. 114th St.; (1904–06, 1926–28) Ernest Flagg, designated June 18, 2002 LP 2113
- Claremont Theater Building, 3320 – 3338 Broadway; (1913–14) Gaetan Ajello, designated June 6, 2006 LP 2198

=== Restorations ===
- The Hamilton Grange, Alexander Hamilton (1802) family home at the time of his death, 287 Convent Avenue; final Manhattan Community Board 9 Uniform Land Use Review Procedure (ULURP) vote on June 21, 2001, remapping St. Nicholas Park so as to provide an easement for the National Park Service to move the Grange and thereby restore it to the original design by John McComb Jr.
- Fully integral revitalization, complete with water and electric globe, of the John Hooper Fountain, Maher Circle, W. 155th St., a landmark as part of the Macombs Dam Bridge designation, January 14, 1992; restoration by the Division of Bridges, NYC DOT.
- Return of windowed walls to the 125th St. elevated IRT Broadway Line Viaduct station, (1900–1904) William Barclay Parsons, designated Nov. 24, 1981; LP 1094; restoration by the Metropolitan Transit Authority.
- Replacement of the white glass tile panels without the addition of inauthentic decoration to the walls of the Columbia University and Cathedral Parkway stations included in the IRT Subway Stations Underground Interiors designation of Oct. 23, 1979 LP 1094; (1904) Heins & LaFarge; restoration by the Metropolitan Transit Authority.
- Use of "City Hall" rather than "World's Fair" benches in the restoration by NYC Dept. of Parks and Recreation of the Morningside Heights sector of Riverside Drive, 113th – 117th Sts. and generally.
- Remounting and repair of the facade of the Sigma Chi Fraternity House at 565 W. 113th St. as part of the construction of the Broadway Residence complex, 2900 Broadway, (2000) Robert A. M. Stern for Columbia University.

=== Interventions ===
- Won a "disapproval" in 1995 of a Landmarks Preservation Commission Certificate of Appropriateness for designs submitted by Columbia University and the Republic of Italy for exterior changes to the Casa Italiana, 1151 Amsterdam Ave.; (1926–27) William Kendall, McKim, Mead, White, a designated landmark.
- Brought a halt to plans by the Amsterdam Nursing Home, 1050 Amsterdam Avenue, to demolish the Croton Aqueduct 113th St. Gatehouse (1874) for construction in 1997 of the Home's Amsterdam Avenue wing.
- Brought a halt to consideration by Columbia University during 1996 of the demolition of Woodbridge Hall, 431 Riverside Drive, (1901) George Keister; St. Luke's Home, 2910 Broadway, (1898) Trowbridge & Livingston; 625 and 627 W. 115th St., (1893) Henry Chapman; Sigma Chi fraternity, 565 W. 113th St. (1903) George Keister; 604 and 606 W. 114th St., (1895) Frank Lang.
- Persuaded Columbia University, 1998, to move the commercial space in the Broadway Residence to block-center to allow the Public Library Branch light, air and primacy afforded by the corner site, Broadway at 113th St.
- Persuaded Columbia University, 2002, to redirect construction of the School of Social Work from the intact turn-of-century W. 113th St.(Broadway/River- side Drive) to an already cleared site on Amsterdam Ave. and 122nd St.
- Won a halt to Columbia University plans, 2003, for a new Admissions Office entrance into Hamilton Hall which would have replaced a segment of the monumental granite wall surrounding South Field with glass block.
- Won a "disapproval" by the NYC City Council, October 24, 2003, of the Landmarks Preservation Commission's designation of the Cathedral Church of St. John the Divine because the commission also removed two develop-ment sites from future regulation by the commission or Public Hearing.

=== Preservation Angel Award ===
On June 28, 2007, Kent was the first recipient of the Preservation Angel Award presented by the Hamilton Heights/West Harlem Community Preservation Organization for distinguished achievement in the field of Upper Manhattan historical preservation.

== Private life ==
Carolyn and her husband, Edward ("Ed") Miles Allen Kent, met as young teens at a Kent Fellowship conference. Carolyn's father had been one of the first Kent Fellows. The group was founded by Edward's grandfather, Charles Foster Kent, to enable those previously excluded by race, religion or funding needs to undertake graduate studies in religion. Edward and Carolyn married on September 8, 1957, at the First Presbyterian Church in Kalamazoo, Michigan. Their three children are Cassady, Hannah and Sarah. Until 2007, Ed taught philosophy, social/political/legal, and gave courses in religion and one in psychology primarily at Brooklyn College where he spent most of his teaching career.

== Later years and death ==
Until weeks before her death, Kent was engaged in the fight to keep intact the Cathedral of St. John the Divine's historic Close; to prevent historic building demolition in Manhattanville by Columbia University; and was working toward designation of the Morningside Heights Residential Historic District/Comprehensive MSH District, and the Tiemann Place Residential Historic District in Manhattanville. Carolyn Kent died, in New York City, after a nine-year bout with lung cancer, on August 22, 2009.

"I admire her ability to get major institutions like Columbia University and churches in West Harlem to appreciate their role in this community ... She set the bar pretty high."
– New York State Senator Bill Perkins

== See also ==
- Historic preservation
- Historic preservation in New York
- Preservationist
