= Community boards of Manhattan =

Civic bodies in the New York City borough of Manhattan

Map of community districts in the City of New York

Community boards of Manhattan are New York City community boards in the borough of Manhattan, which are the appointed advisory groups of the community districts that advise on land use and zoning, participate in the city budget process, and address service delivery in their district.

Community boards each have up to 50 volunteer members appointed by the local borough president, half from nominations by City Council members representing the community district (i.e., whose council districts cover part of the community district). Additionally, all City Council members representing the community district are non-voting, ex officio board members.

== History ==
The 1963 revision of the New York City Charter extended the Borough of Manhattan's "Community Planning Councils" (est. 1951) to the outer boroughs as "Community Planning Boards", which are now known as "Community Boards".

The 1975 revision of the New York City Charter set the number of Community Districts/Boards to 59, established the position of the district manager for the community districts, and created the Uniform Land Use Review Procedure (ULURP) which gave the community boards the authority to review land use proposals such as zoning actions and special permits.

Borough	Borough President (B.P.)	Number of Districts	Max. number of B.P. appointees	Max. number of all appointees
Manhattan	Mark Levine	12	300	600

== Community District 1 ==
Consists of neighborhoods:

- TriBeCa
- Financial District, Manhattan
- Civic Center - older name was Five Points
- Battery Park City
- South Street Seaport
- part of Chinatown
- Battery Park
- City Hall Park
- Besides, there are three virtually uninhabited islands in the District. Their status is complicated by a number of political and historical factors:
  - Ellis Island
  - Liberty Island
  - Governors Island

== Community District 2 ==
Consists of neighborhoods:

- Greenwich Village
  Greenwich Village includes also:
  - West Village
  - South Village
  - Washington Square Park
- NoHo
- SoHo
  - SoHo, to its west, includes Hudson Square
- Little Italy
- part of Chinatown

== Community District 3 ==
Consists of neighborhoods:

- Lower East Side
- East Village
  - Tompkins Square Park is located in East Village
  - Avenues A to D are sometimes known as Alphabet City
- Chinatown
- Two Bridges

== Community District 4 ==
Consists of neighborhoods:

- Hell's Kitchen (also called Clinton)
- Chelsea

Sources:

- NYC DCP Profile of Community District 4
- Official website of Community Board 4

== Community District 5 ==
Consists of neighborhoods:

- Midtown
- Times Square
- Herald Square
- Midtown South
- Flatiron District
- part of Murray Hill
- part of Chelsea
- part of Gramercy
- Union Square

== Community District 6 ==
Consists of neighborhoods:

- part of Murray Hill
- Sutton Place
- Beekman Place
- Turtle Bay
- Tudor City
- part of Gramercy
  - Kips Bay area is located inside Gramercy
- Peter Cooper
- Stuyvesant Park
- Stuyvesant Town

Bellevue Hospital Center and the United Nations headquarters are located in the District.

== Community District 7 ==
Consists of one neighborhood:

- Upper West Side including:
  - Central Park West Historic District
  - Northern part of Upper West Side between West 96 Street and West 110 Street is known as Manhattan Valley or West Harlem
  - Lincoln Square including Lincoln Center

== Community District 8 ==
Consists of neighborhoods:

- Yorkville
  - Carl Schurz Park is located in Yorkville
- Upper East Side
- Lenox Hill

The following neighborhoods are located on the same named islands in East River.

- Roosevelt Island
- Mill Rock

North-Western area of the District with South-Eastern boundary point at 3rd Avenue and East 86 Street is named Carnegie Hill

== Community District 9 ==
Consists of neighborhoods:

- Hamilton Heights
- Manhattanville
- Morningside Heights
- Columbia University

== Community District 10 ==
Consists of the only neighborhood:

- Central Harlem

Polo Grounds is located in the District.

== Community District 11 ==
Consists of only one neighborhood on Manhattan Island:

- East Harlem

Sometimes it is named Spanish Harlem or El Barrio.

In addition, two neighborhoods, located on the islands of the same names, are parts of the District:

- Randall's Island
- Wards Island

There is Mount Morris Park in the District.

== Community District 12 ==
Consists of two neighborhoods:

- Inwood
- Washington Heights
  - Part of Washington Heights is known as Hudson Heights

Inwood Hill Park is located in the District.

== Other areas ==
Marble Hill, while legally a part of New York County ("Manhattan") is represented primarily by Bronx Community Board 8 and also by Bronx Community Board 7.

Within the borough of Manhattan there is one Joint Interest Area (JIA), which is outside of the jurisdiction of individual community districts, and have their own district number. The only JIA in New York county is:

- JIA 64 - Central Park, 2010 Census population: 25

== Notable members ==
- Anita Altman (Manhattan CB7)
- Shaun Abreu (Manhattan CB9)
- Brian Benjamin (Manhattan CB10)
- Gale Brewer (Manhattan CB7)
- Margaret Chin (Manhattan CB1 & CB3)
- Nick Fish (Manhattan CB5)
- Sylvia Friedman (Manhattan CB6)
- James F. Gennaro (Manhattan CB8)
- Robert Holden (politician) (Manhattan CB5)
- Corey Johnson (politician) (Manhattan CB4)
- Ben Kallos (Manhattan CB8)
- Carolyn Kent (Manhattan CB9)
- Julie Menin (Manhattan CB1)
- Keith Powers (Manhattan CB6)
- Dan Quart (Manhattan CB8)
- Carlina Rivera (Manhattan CB3)
- Helen Rosenthal (Manhattan CB7)
- Leslie Wyche (Manhattan CB9 & CB11)

== See also ==
- Government of New York City
- List of Manhattan neighborhoods
- New York City Council
- Borough president
- Borough boards of New York City
