= Leslie Wyche =

American community activist (1944–2018)

Leslie Wyche, Jr.
- Born: April 25, 1944; New York
- Died: January 19, 2018 (aged 73); Bronx, New York, U.S.
- Education: Bachelors degree, Masters of Social Work (MSW) degree from Florida State University

Leslie Wyche (1944–2018) was a New York City community activist, and a long time Harlem resident. He was known in Harlem as the uptown neighborhood's honorary mayor. He liked being the Harlem Mayor, and is quoted in the New York Times as saying, “I’m the kind of guy who likes to be among the people." The position of Harlem mayor was started in 1947 by Reuben Patton, who was the president of the Locality Mayors Committee of New York. He was a civic leader, philanthropist, and active in the Harlem community. The position comes with no salary and no official powers.

Dr. Benjamin Watkins held the title of mayor of Harlem in 1967 till 1995. The position is unsalaried, but it is said that the holders of the title take it seriously as a voice for Harlem. The position had been dormant for 20 years after the passing of Dr. Watkins, but in 1995 the title of honorary mayor of Harlem was resurrected by the Amsterdam News.

The position of Mayor of Harlem was prominent in the 1950s and 1960s, when elections were held.

Leslie worked for Assembly woman Inez Dickens when she was a New York City Council member. He has an Omega Psi Phi fraternity, and with One Hundred Black Men, Inc. He was known to be dapper. He appeared in several scenes as an extra in the movie American Gangster, and Denzel Washington played the Harlem drug lord Frank Lucas.

Leslie had been district manager for Manhattan Community Board 9 and 11 in New York City.

He died on January 19, 2018, at Montefiore Medical Center in Bronx, New York.

== Quotes ==
"As the real honorary mayor, I am beyond political parties". "I am here to work with whoever it takes. I am here to work with folks who are here to make our community a better place to live in".
