= Old Broadway Synagogue =

Historic Orthodox synagogue in New York City

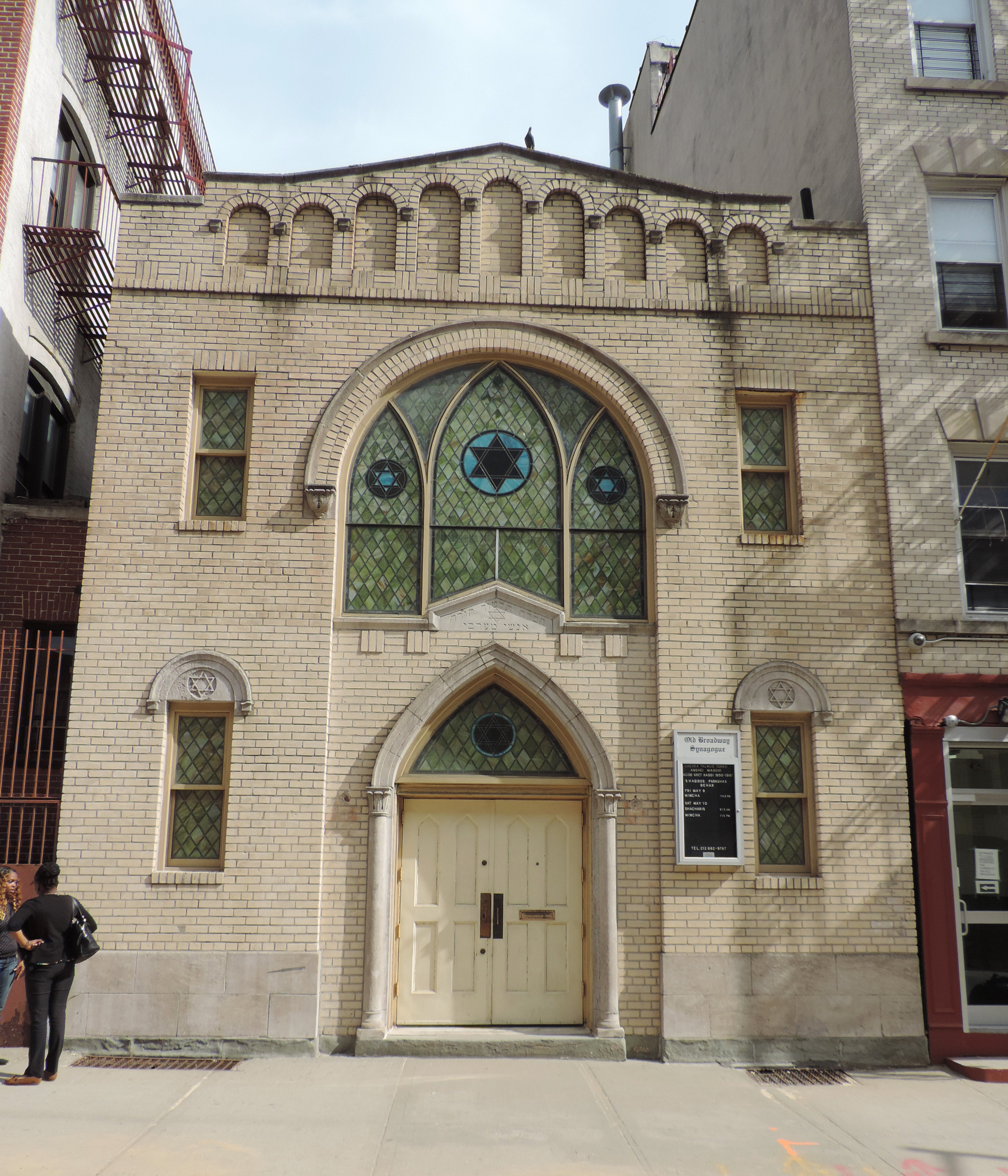
- Old Broadway Synagogue in 2014

- Location in Manhattan

Religion
- Affiliation: Orthodox Judaism
- Rite: Nusach Ashkenaz
- Ecclesiastical or organisational status: Synagogue
- Status: Active

Location
- Location: 15 Old Broadway, Manhattanville, Harlem, Manhattan, New York City, New York 10027
- Country: United States
- Coordinates: 40°48′55″N 73°57′27″W

Architecture
- Architects: Meisner and Uffner
- Type: Synagogue
- Style: Gothic Revival
- Established: 1911 (as a congregation)
- Completed: 1923

Website
- oldbroadwaysynagogue.blogspot.com
- Old Broadway Synagogue
- U.S. National Register of Historic Places
- New York State Register of Historic Places
- Area: 0.1 acres (0.040 ha)
- NRHP reference No.: 01001440
- NYSRHP No.: 06101.012110

Significant dates
- Added to NRHP: January 11, 2002
- Designated NYSRHP: November 2, 2001

Old Broadway Synagogue, officially Chevra Talmud Torah Anshei Marovi, is an Orthodox Jewish synagogue located at 15 Old Broadway, in the Manhattanville neighborhood of Harlem, Manhattan, in New York City, New York, United States. The congregation practices in the Ashkenazi rite.

The congregation was incorporated in 1911 under the name Chevra Talmud Torah Anshei Marovi by Morris Schiff, a Polish immigrant who lived in the Harlem area, an area with a high Jewish population at the time. As of 2011, the congregation claimed to represent the diversity of the West Harlem community, including students from Columbia University, Barnard College, and the Jewish Theological Seminary.

Built in 1923, the synagogue building was listed on the National Register of Historic Places in January 2002.

Rabbi Jacob Kret served as the Rabbi for 47 years from 1950 until 1997.

== Description ==
The Synagogue is located at 15 Old Broadway (a rare vestige of the Bloomingdale Road in Manhattan). The Old Broadway Synagogue was built in 1923/1924 and designed by the architectural firm of Meisner and Uffner. The congregation formed from the mostly Ashkenazic Jewish population of Russian and Polish immigrants to New York during the 1880s who had made their way up to Central Harlem, then migrated to blocks west as well as students for nearby schools. The members initially met in storefronts and purportedly in the back room of a bar until the congregation purchased a house on Old Broadway. This structure was torn down shortly thereafter to make way for the synagogue. The congregation had an active Talmud Torah (Hebrew school) probably from its founding until the 1960s or 1970s. Among its early rabbis were the author Simon Glazer and Shepard Brodie.

Paul Radensky, Museum Educator for Jewish Schools for the Museum of Jewish Heritage is the president of the congregation.

In 2003, the blue and green central windows were restored after being covered in brick in the 1960's.
