= Harlem Arts Festival =

American annual music festival in New York City

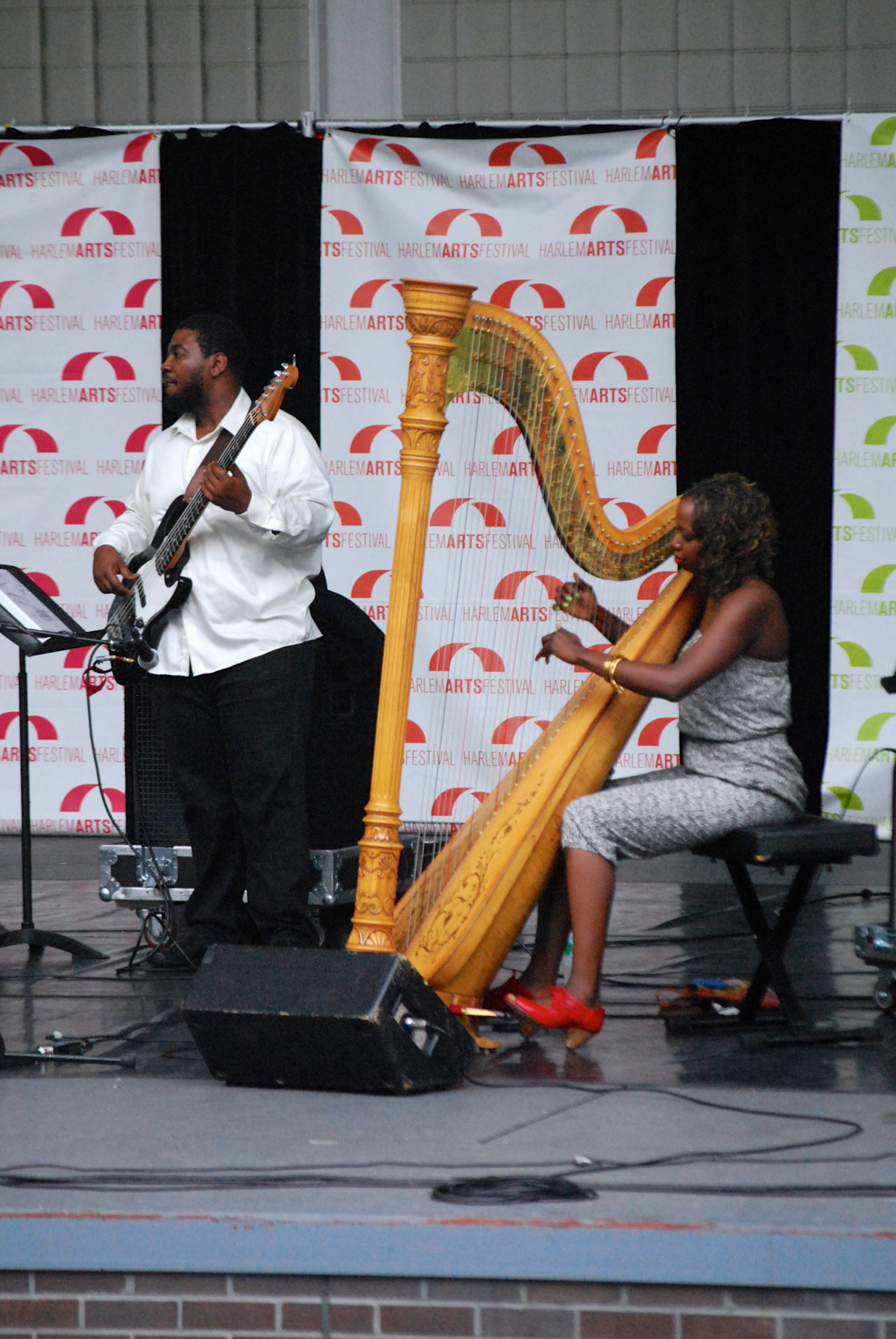
- Brandee Younger performing at the Harlem Arts Festival in 2013
- Genre: R&B, soul music, jazz, dance, visual arts, theatre, Spoken word, etc.
- Dates: Last weekend of June each year
- Locations: Mount Morris Park in Harlem; Manhattan, New York City
- Founders: Neal Ludevig, J.J. El-Far and Chelsea Goding
- Attendance: 6,000 annually
- Website: harlemartsfestival.com

The Harlem Arts Festival is an annual arts festival and arts nonprofit based in Harlem that began in 2012. The organization presented community-based music, dance, theatre, and visual artists at Marcus Garvey Park and the surrounding Harlem area. Notable participants included Queen Esther, Toni Blackman, Brandee Younger, Kris Bowers, Divinity Roxx, Marc Cary, AKIR, Timothy Bloom, Brady Watt, Maurice "Mobetta" Brown, M-1, Solomon Hicks, Bentley Meeker, among many others.

== History ==
The organization and festival was co-founded and led by three local Harlem producers: Neal Ludevig, J.J. El-Far and Chelsea Goding. The festival debuted in 2012 after a successful Kickstarter campaign garnered press from The New York Times, The Daily News, DNAInfo, Northhattan News, and a number of other media outlets. The organization presented more than 200 artists to more than 17,000 attendees in 5 years.

In 2014, the organization honored musician and social activist Fred Ho with its annual Lynette Velasco Community Impact Award, which honored the NYC's Assembly Member Inez Dickens late Chief of Staff.

In 2017, the festival's headlining performance, which featured Prodigy from Mobb Deep, passed away shortly before his performance. In response to his death, the organizers and Maurice "Mobetta" Brown, a long-time collaborator of Prodigy's, paid tribute to him through performances alongside M-1 (of Dead Prez) and a number of other musicians. HipHopDX premiered an exclusive from the festival where M-1 spit never-before-heard verses from Dead Prez's debut album, Lets Get Free.

== Recognition ==
Harlem Arts Festival received letters of support from a number of NYC elected officials and local entities, including Manhattan Borough President Gale Brewer, Assembly member Inez Dickens, Congressman Charles Rangel, Councilman Mark Levine, Melissa Mark-Viverito, Councilman Bill Perkins, among others.

NYC Congressman Charles Rangel declared an official proclamation of a "Harlem Arts Festival Day" on June 22, 2015.

In June 2016, Uptown Scoop listed Harlem Arts Festival as #1 on its list of the 100 best things to do in Harlem.

In 2017, Baucemag listed Harlem Arts Festival as #5 in a list of "12 Major Events Where You Can Meet a High-Quality BAUCE Bae".
