= Simon Glazer =

American rabbi (c. 1876–1938)

Rabbi Simon Glazer
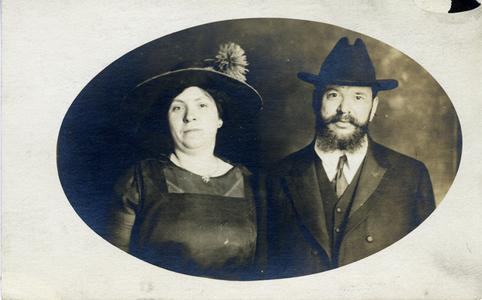
- Rabbi and Rebbetzin Simon Glazer in 1917
- Title: Rabbi

Personal life
- Born: Shimon Glazer; 1876 or 1878 Kovno (Kaunas), Lithuania
- Died: 1938 New York, New York
- Spouse: Ida (Cantor) Glazer
- Children: B. Benedict Glazer, Charles Glazer, Aubrey Glazer, Jeannette Schneer, Edith Goldberg
- Occupation: Rabbi, Author, Lecturer

Religious life
- Religion: Judaism
- Denomination: Orthodox
- Profession: Rabbi, Author

Jewish leader
- Synagogue: Chevra Kadisha Synagogue, Old Broadway Synagogue
- Organisation: United Synagogues of Montreal and Quebec City

Simon Glazer (or Shimon Glazer; 1876?-1938) was an Orthodox Jewish rabbi who flourished at the turn of the twentieth century. He was known for founding and leading two major organizations of American Orthodox rabbis.

== Background ==
Born in a Lithuanian Jewish family in Kaunas, Lithuania (known as Kovno at the time, or Kovne in Glazer's native Yiddish), his year of birth is not certain, and may have been either 1876 or 1878. He was president of the Council of Orthodox Rabbis of the United States and Canada, and co-founded the Agudath ha-Rabbanim, the Assembly of Hebrew Orthodox Rabbis of America.

Glazer's professional career was spent primarily in Montreal and New York City. He came to be the chief rabbi of the United Synagogues of Montreal and Quebec City before he moved to New York.

Glazer wrote a number of books, and was a supporter of Zionism. He campaigned for a Congressional resolution on the Jewish Palestine question in the 1920s. He also organized an effort, through the rabbinic organizations he led or participated in, to delay the institution of quotas on Jewish immigration to the United States. The effort was unsuccessful in that the legislation passed, but successful in that it delayed it long enough to allow thousands of Jews to come to the US. After the laws passed, he received authority from President Warren G. Harding to adopt five Romanian orphans, in order to provide them entry into the country.

Unusual for an Eastern European-trained rabbi of the period, he had a secular education, which aided him in his positions in North America, and allowed him to write books in English for an American public.

Glazer emigrated to Palestine to avoid Russian conscription, and then went to the United States in 1902. He held a position in Toledo, Ohio from that time until 1905.

In 1907, Glazer accepted a position in Montreal, for what was then known as the United Orthodox Congregations of Montreal, form which he expanded his role into Chief Rabbi of Montreal. He took interest in the poor immigrant population, who had previously not had any official supporters. In 1910, he founded the Montreal Hebrew Old People's and Sheltering Home, which was both an old age home and an orphanage. He also helped start the local Yiddish language newspaper, Keneder Adler.

These undertakings created controversy with the establishment organizations, and their rabbi, Zvi Hirsch Cohen, who arranged for a newspaper article critical of Glazer. The rivalry escalated into the kashruth supervision of meat, and even became physical at one point. Eventually, Glazer had enough, and moved back to the United States in 1918, taking the rabbinate of Congregation Bikur Cholim of Seattle, Washington. In 1920, he took a position as rabbi in charge of a consortium of eight synagogues in Kansas City metropolitan area (Kansas City, Missouri and Kansas City, Kansas). He was more successful there in leading a citywide kehilla than he had been in Montreal.

In 1923, he moved to New York, where he spent the remainder of his career. His first post there was rabbi of Beth Medrash Hagadol of Harlem, followed by Congregation Beth-El of Brooklyn in 1927, and finally the Maimonides Synagogue of Manhattan from 1930 until his death in 1938 of heart disease.

Though Glazer was Orthodox, his writings and personal papers are in the collection of Hebrew Union College, the seminary of Reform Judaism. The collection contains correspondence, lectures, notes, writings, diaries, Hebrew and Yiddish manuscripts. It also has other records of his rabbinical career.

His 26 books include:

- Sefer Maaneh Halashon: Tefillot al Bet A'lmin - Prayers Upon the Cemetery Revised and Translated in English (1928) New York.
- History of Israel. (Based upon Graetz-Doubnow) in 6 volumes (1930). Star Hebrew Book Co., New York.
- The Palestine Resolution A Record Of Its Origin (1922), Cline Publishing Company on behalf of United Synagogues of Greater Kansas City, Kansas City, Mo. ISBN 978-1179881812
- The Five Books of Moses (Haphtoroth and the Five Megiloth); Prayers for the Sabbath; Enumeration of the 613 Commandments; New and Accurate Translation of All the Verses Whence the Commandments are Inferred (1935) Maimon Publishing/Ktav Publishing House, Inc., New York. OCLC 977796225, 854129995, 1002030519
- Mishnah Torah Yod Ha-Hazakah, Translated (1927). Maimonides Publishing.
- The Jews of Iowa. Complete History and Accurate Account of their Religious, Social, Economical and Educational Progress in this State; History of the Jews of Europe, North and South America in Modern Times; and a Brief History of Iowa (1904) Koch Brothers Printing Company, Des Moines, Iowa.
- The Bar Mitzvah Pulpit: Sermonettes for Bar Mitzvah Boys and Others (1928) Star Hebrew Book Co., New York.
- Guide of Judaism: Moreh ha-Yahadut : A Systematic Work for the Study and Instruction of the Whole Scope of Judaism (1917) Hebrew Publish Company, New York.
