= Bentley Meeker =

American artist and lighting designer

- Born: Roanoke, VA
- Known for: Installation Art, Lighting Designer, Site-Specific Art

Bentley Meeker is an American artist and lighting designer. He lives in Harlem, New York and works in Hell’s Kitchen, New York. Meeker's artistic practice is concerned with the properties of light and how they affect us. In 2014, he created The "H” in Harlem, a large scale public art installation suspended under the 125th St and 12th Ave viaduct in Harlem, NYC. In 2016, Meeker was commissioned by Michelle Obama to create a light sculpture for the Nordic state dinner at The White House. Later that year, Bentley Meeker was selected to be a Harlem Arts Festival 2016 artist and created the piece entitled "Indigo". He has been a multi-year featured artist at Burning Man in Northwestern Nevada, creating the lighting for the Temple of Transition, Temple of Whollyness and Temple of Promise. Additionally, he has shown at the Southampton Center for the Arts, The Whitney Museum of American Art, National Arts Club, the CORE:club and galleries in Chelsea and SoHo. Outside of art, Meeker is the founder and president of Bentley Meeker Lighting & Staging, Inc., a lighting company known for creating unique light environments for various events.

== Projects ==
=== Solo shows ===
- Flame to Now I–III – Gallery nine5 (2012)
- Flame to Now IV – The Whitney Museum of American Art (2012)
- 186,281 – Gallery 151 (2013)
- 186,282 – National Arts Club (2015)
- Bold Notion – The CORE: club (2016)

=== Group shows ===
- Spring 2013 – Southampton Arts Center (2013)
- Indigo – Marcus Garvey Park, Harlem Arts Festival (2016)
- Grasslands – Penticton Art Gallery (2017)

=== Other projects ===
- The Oculus Holiday Lights – The Oculus World Trade Center station (PATH) (2016)
- The "H" in Harlem - Harlem (2014)
- Temple of Transition – Burning Man (2011)
- Temple of Whollyness – Burning Man (2013)
- Temple of Promise – Burning Man (2015)
