= Manhattanville, Manhattan =

Neighborhood in New York City

Manhattanville
- Neighborhood of Manhattan
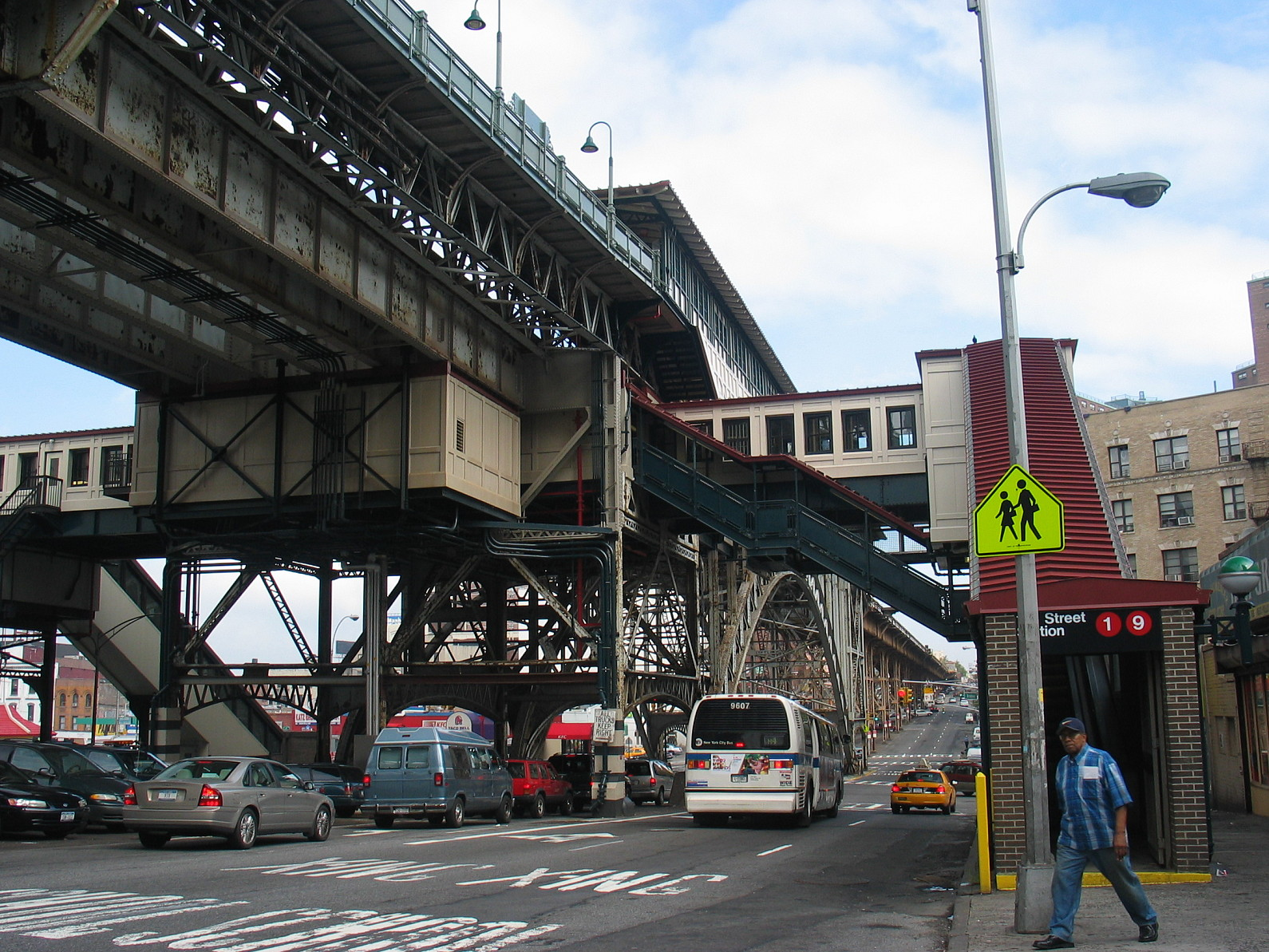
- The 125th Street station (1 train) at Broadway and 125th Street, one of Manhattanville's primary subway stations. Visible on the signage is the former 9 train.
- Interactive map of Manhattanville
- Coordinates: 40.816°N 73.956°W
- Country: United States
- State: New York
- City: New York City
- Borough: Manhattan
- Community District: Manhattan 9

Area
  - Total: 0.356 sq mi (0.92 km^{2})

Population (2016)
  - Total: 40,568
  - Density: 114,000/sq mi (44,000/km^{2})

Ethnicity
  - Hispanic: 62.8%
  - Black: 25.8
  - White: 7.5
  - Asian: 2.2
  - Others: 1.7

Economics
  - Median income: $41,453
- Time zone: UTC−5 (Eastern)
  - Summer (DST): UTC−4 (EDT)
- ZIP Codes: 10027, 10031
- Area codes: 212, 332, 646, and 917

Manhattanville (also known as West Harlem or West Central Harlem, after its location near Harlem) is a neighborhood in the New York City borough of Manhattan. It is bordered on the north by 135th Street; on the south by 122nd and 125th Streets; on the west by Hudson River; and on the east by Adam Clayton Powell Jr. Boulevard and the campus of City College.

Throughout the nineteenth century, Manhattanville bustled around a wharf active with ferry and daily river conveyances. It was the first station on the Hudson River Railroad running north from the city, and the hub of daily stage coach, omnibus and streetcar lines. Situated near Bloomingdale Road, its hotels, houses of entertainment and post office made it an alluring destination of suburban retreat from the city, yet its direct proximity to the Hudson River also made it an invaluable industrial entry point for construction materials and other freight bound for Upper Manhattan. With the construction of road and railway viaducts over the valley in which the town sat, Manhattanville, increasingly absorbed into the growing city, became a marginalized industrial area. In the early 2000s, the neighborhood became the site of a major planned expansion of Columbia University, which has campuses in Morningside Heights to the south and Washington Heights to the north.

Manhattanville is part of Manhattan Community District 9, and its primary ZIP Codes are 10027 and 10031. It is patrolled by the 26th Precinct of the New York City Police Department.

== Name and geography ==
The neighborhood is known as Manhattanville, after a village on the same site. Manhattanville is located west of Adam Clayton Powell Jr. Boulevard (extending to the Hudson River), between approximately 135th Street to the north and 122nd and 125th Streets to the south. The southern boundary sits on a steep slope that ascends to a high plateau which contains the neighborhood of Morningside Heights.

Manhattanville is sometimes also known as West Harlem or West Central Harlem, after its location near Harlem. However, the West Harlem name is sometimes applied to a broader area that roughly corresponds with Manhattan Community District 9, which extends south to 110th Street (overlapping with Morningside Heights) and north to 155th Street (overlapping with Sugar Hill and Hamilton Heights).

== History ==
=== Colonial period and establishment ===
The village of Manhattanville was founded in 1806 and quickly gained prominence as an outpost of the city. The village grew around the crossroads of Bloomingdale Road and Manhattan Street, now roughly Broadway and 125th Street.

The village's original streets were laid out by Jacob Schieffelin and other wealthy merchants, mostly Quakers, who had country seats in the area.

The town thrived as a result of the development of Manhattan Street from the Hudson River, whose convenient access also became a crucial catalyst in the growth of the older village of Harlem to the southeast on the Harlem River. Situated at approximately the same latitude, Harlem and Manhattanville flourished together throughout the 19th century as the two most prominent villages in upper Manhattan.

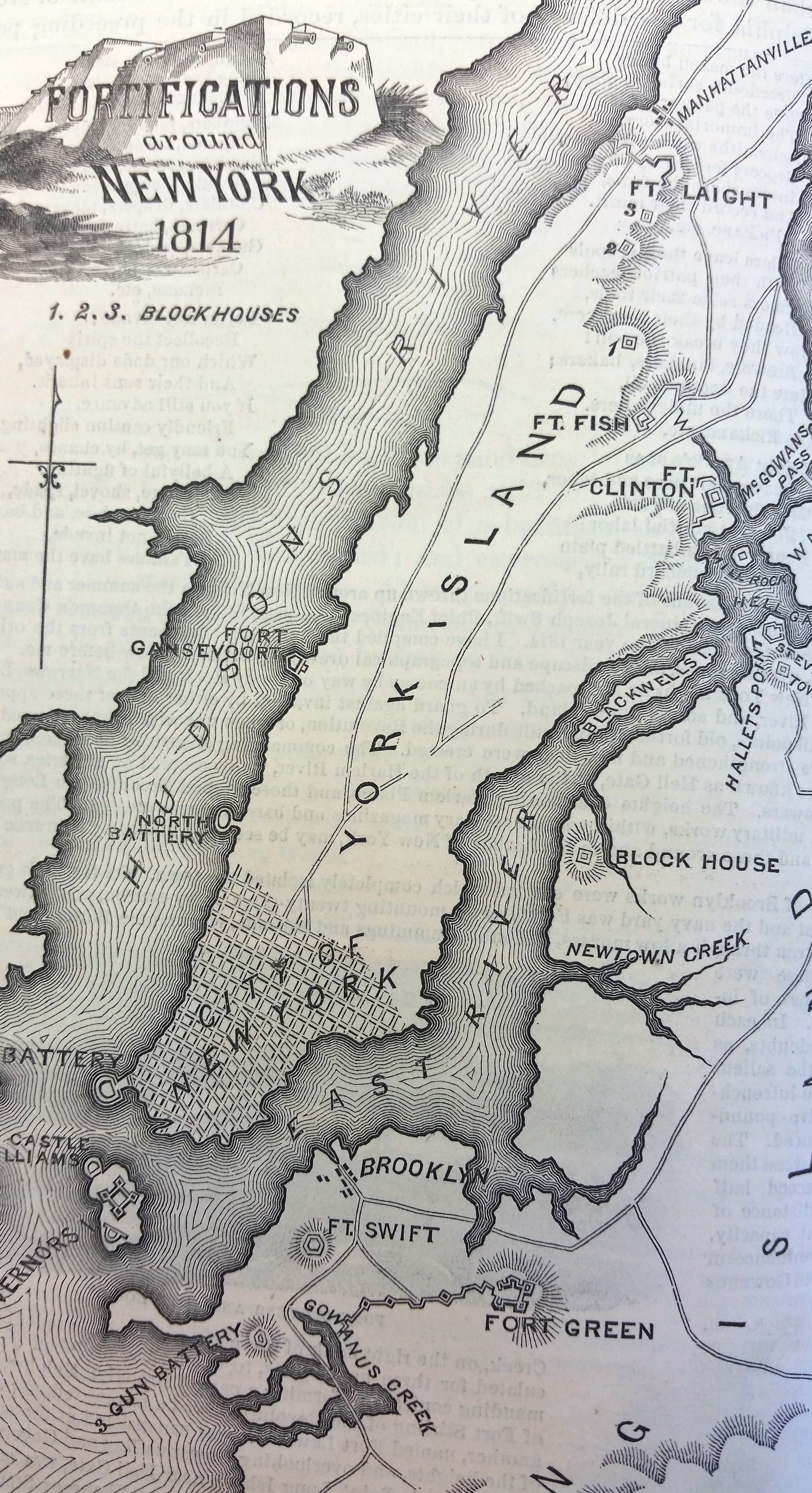
Manhattanville forts

Manhattanville sits in a valley formerly called Moertje David's Vly ("Mother David's Valley"; in Dutch, Vly is short for vallei, or "valley") during the Dutch Colonial period and as Harlem Cove during the English Colonial period. During the American Revolutionary War, the valley was also known as the Hollow Way, where the main action of the Battle of Harlem Heights began under the command of General George Washington. During the War of 1812 the valley's southern ridges figured as the site of the Manhattanville Pass, whose defense fortifications and breastworks included Fort Laight and Blockhouse No. 4, which became the sites of Morningside Gardens Houses and PS 36, respectively.

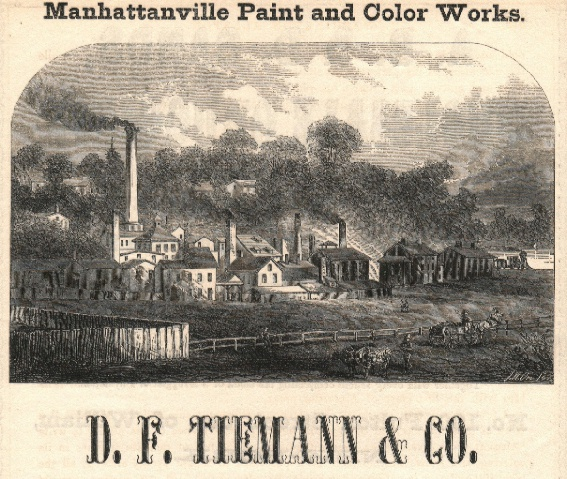
Daniel F. Tiemann's paint factory

Manhattanville's early population was a diverse and eclectic mix of intermarried American patriots and British loyalists; at least one prominent former African slave trader (this seems to be a reference to Michael Hogan, whose wife was of mixed British and Indian ancestry, born in Bombay); slave owners and enslaved African-Americans; Quaker anti-slavery activists and free black abolitionists; tradesmen, poor laborers and wealthy industrialists. Many were affiliated with the same institutions, principally the historic New York City landmarked St. Mary's Protestant Episcopal Church, organized in 1823, which was the first Episcopal church to dissolve pew rent in 1831, and the Manhattanville Free School (established in 1827, later Public School No. 43) still at their original sites. Manhattanville's most prominent resident was industrialist Daniel F. Tiemann (1805–1899), owner of the D. F. Tiemann & Company Color Works, who was also Mayor of New York City from 1858 to 1859. The Tiemann laboratory and factory which was originally located on 23rd Street and Fourth Avenue in Gramercy, near Madison Square Park, relocated uptown to Manhattanville in 1832, in part due to an underground spring of running water at the new uptown location, which is today the site of 560 Riverside Drive.

=== Immigration and urbanization ===
According to Eric K. Washington, "With Manhattanville's formation, the new village quickly became a significant suburban destination along the Bloomingdale Road [today's 125th St.]... Manhattanville flourished naturally as a nexus of various transportation arteries." In the late nineteenth century, Manhattanville experienced a development boom of residential buildings, churches, hospitals, institutional construction, and transportation made it a desirable location for the brewery business.

Later noteworthy population changes occurred around the mid-19th century following the opening of the Hudson River Railroad in 1850, with an influx of mostly Catholic Irish (who established the Church of the Annunciation in 1854) and Germans (who established St. Joseph's Roman Catholic Church in 1860). After the American Civil War, the Jewish immigrant population that began to distinguish itself in Harlem gradually filtered into the western blocks of Manhattanville (and established Chevra Talmud Torah Anshei Marovi, also known as Old Broadway Synagogue, in 1911). Other prominent 19th-century Manhattanville institutions included the Academy of Convent of the Sacred Heart (later called Manhattanville College) and Manhattan College (later called Manhattan University).

In 1904, the opening of the Interborough Rapid Transit Company (IRT)'s new Broadway–Seventh Avenue Line, now part of the 1 train on the New York City Subway, galvanized Manhattanville's radical transformation from rural exburb to an extension of the growing city, with the elevated railway providing rapid transit downtown. Cuban, Dominican and Puerto Rican immigrants moved into the area during the 20th century. By the 1970s, the southern part of Manhattanville (up to about 125th Street) was being filled by Columbia and Barnard College students, staff and faculty, as the university continued to expand.

West 125th Street has experienced a general economic upturn since the end of the 1990s. Many of the buildings below 125th Street have converted to cooperative ownership as the area experiences continuing gentrification and increasing demand for housing. In collaboration with the community, the city has developed a plan for the 125th Street corridor focusing on reinforcing and building upon its strengths as an arts and cultural corridor.

=== 21st century ===
==== University expansions ====
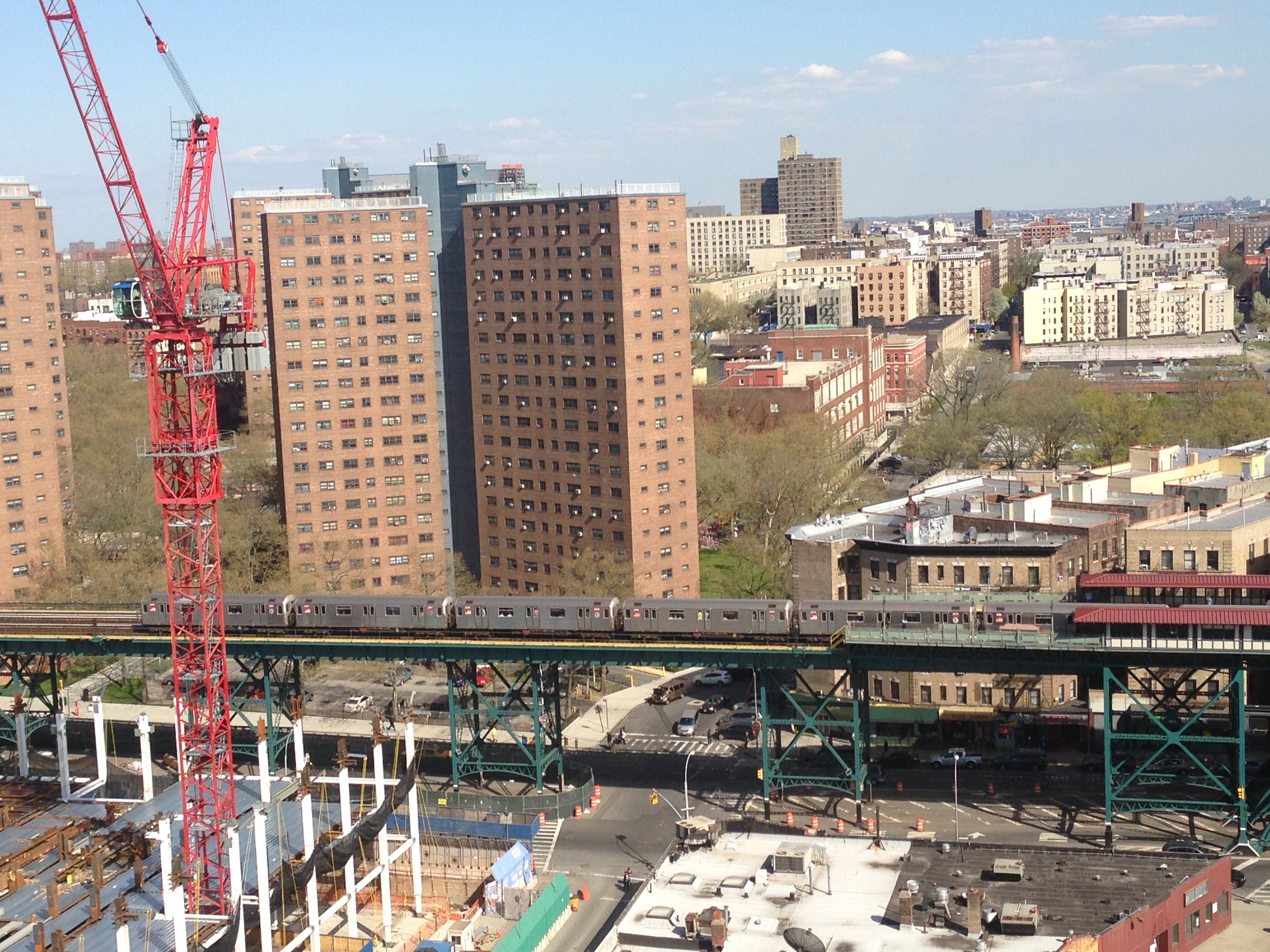
Columbia University construction near the 125th Street station

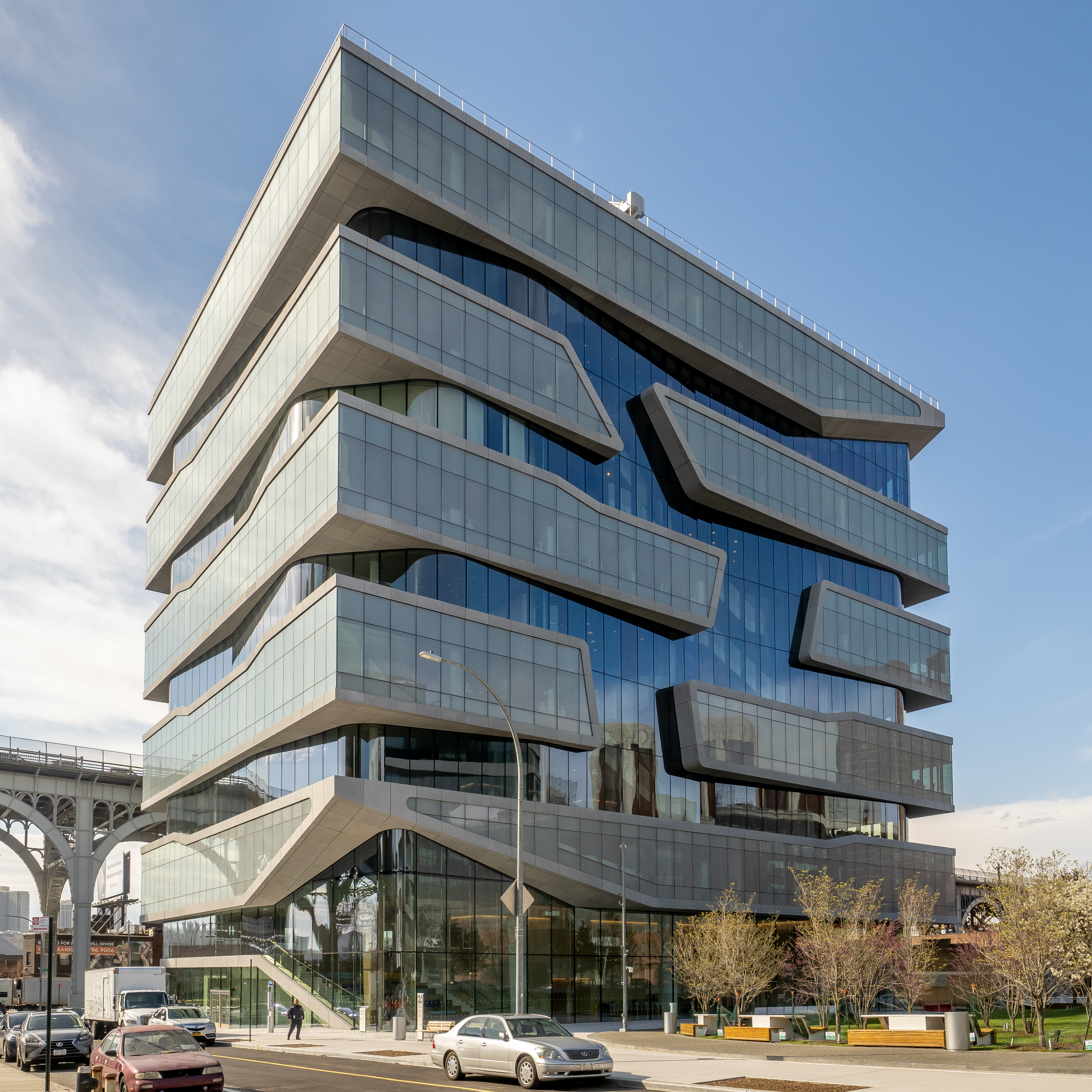
Kravis Hall at Columbia Business School

Manhattanville is the site of a planned major expansion of Columbia University. The university purchased several square blocks of the neighborhood between 125th and 133rd Streets on the south and north and between Broadway and 12th Avenue on the east side of Broadway from 131 to 134, west of the housing projects. According to the plan, the physical plant of those blocks will be partly demolished to construct a new campus, secondary school and park land, designed by Italian architect Renzo Piano. Local residents feared the impact of the further gentrification from this expansion in addition to the possible, and controversial, use of eminent domain. In 2006, Columbia built a new School of Social Work on Amsterdam Avenue at 122nd Street. In June 2007, the New York City Department of City Planning certified that Columbia's application for the rezoning is complete. This action launched the public review and comment period under the city's Uniform Land Use Review Procedure, which lasted until the end of 2007. In December of the same year, the New York City Council voted to approve Columbia's proposed rezoning of the site. Renzo Piano Workshop designed three structures for the Manhattanville Campus; these structure were complete by 2018.

Other colleges have been building dormitories in the area as well. To the north, the 589-student dorm The Towers finished construction in June 2006 as an extension of the City College of New York on St. Nicholas Terrace. This is the first time that City College has housed students on the campus. Occupancy began in August 2006. To the south, near 122nd Street, the Manhattan School of Music also built a dormitory around 2003. In 2006, Jewish Theological Seminary of America opened a smaller dormitory on 122nd Street between Broadway and Amsterdam Avenue.

In August 2009, at 135th Street and Convent Avenue, City College completed the construction of a new 135,000-square-foot (12,500 m^{2}) School of Architecture and Urban Design building (The Bernard and Anne Spitzer School of Architecture, named after the New York real estate developer and philanthropist, Bernard Spitzer and his wife). Based on a pre-existing 1950s structure, the old Cohen Library on South Campus, this redesign and reconstruction by Rafael Viñoly Architects is intended to add a modern aesthetic to the eclectic architectural mix in the area.

==== West Harlem Piers ====
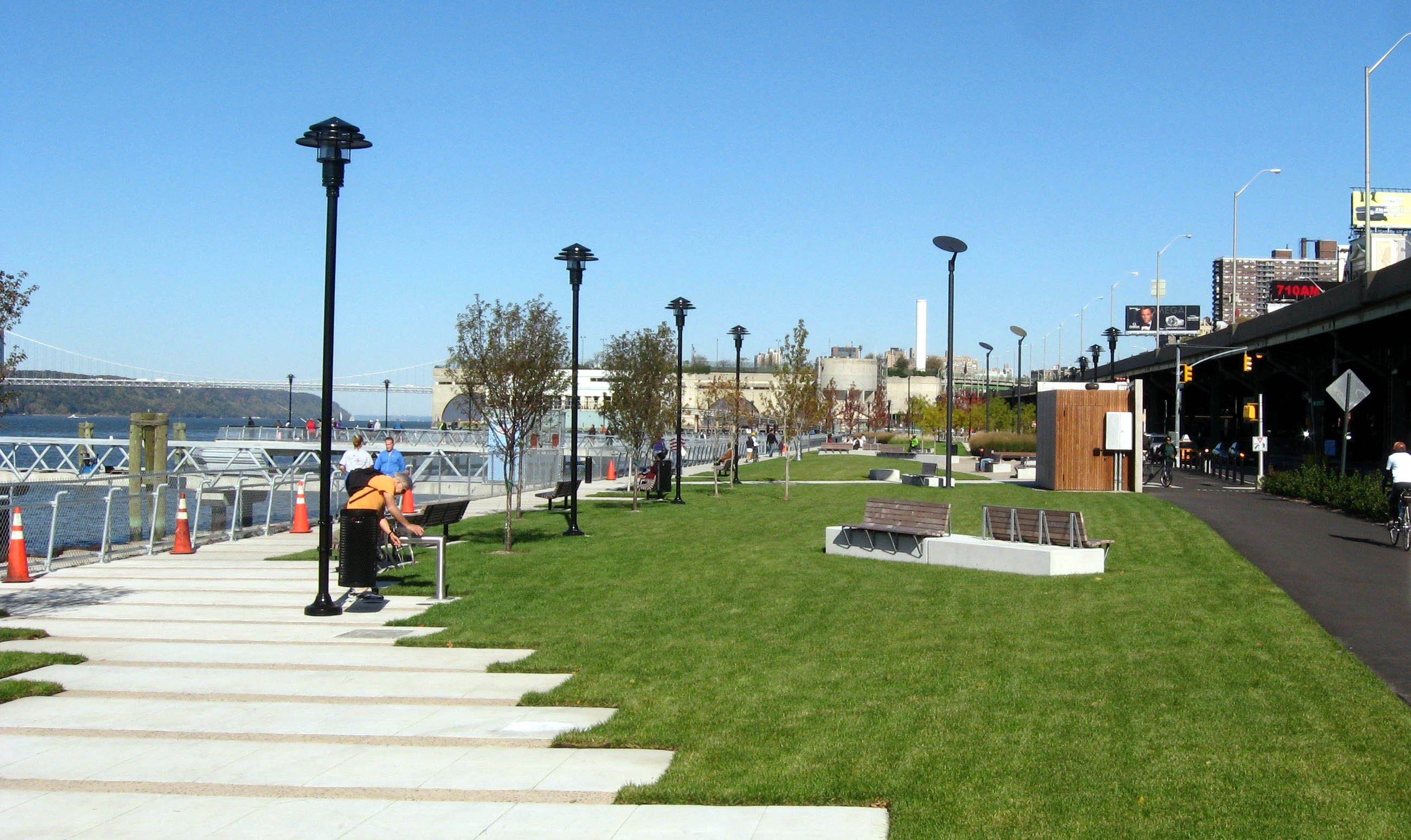
West Harlem Piers

Construction of the West Harlem Piers Waterfront park began in April 2006, after a groundbreaking ceremony in November 2005. The park, funded by the New York City Economic Development Corporation and designed by W Architecture and Landscape Architecture, includes a fishing pier, a kayak launch (non-functional since before 2019), sculptures, and water taxi landings (but no water taxis). Stretching from 125th Street to 132nd Street, partly on land formerly used as a parking lot, it is one of a series of contemporary landscape architecture projects (including the High Line and Brooklyn Bridge Park) that reclaim obsolete infrastructure as public space. The piers formerly served ferries including the Public Service Corporation link to Edgewater, New Jersey. The park closed a gap in the Manhattan Waterfront Greenway that runs along the western side of Manhattan Island and will later connect up the Hudson River. It opened in early October 2008, delayed through the summer by the discovery that fencing designed to prevent users from falling into the river did not meet specifications. The area that surrounds the park and piers is at times called ViVa (Viaduct Valley).

==== Arts and nightlife ====
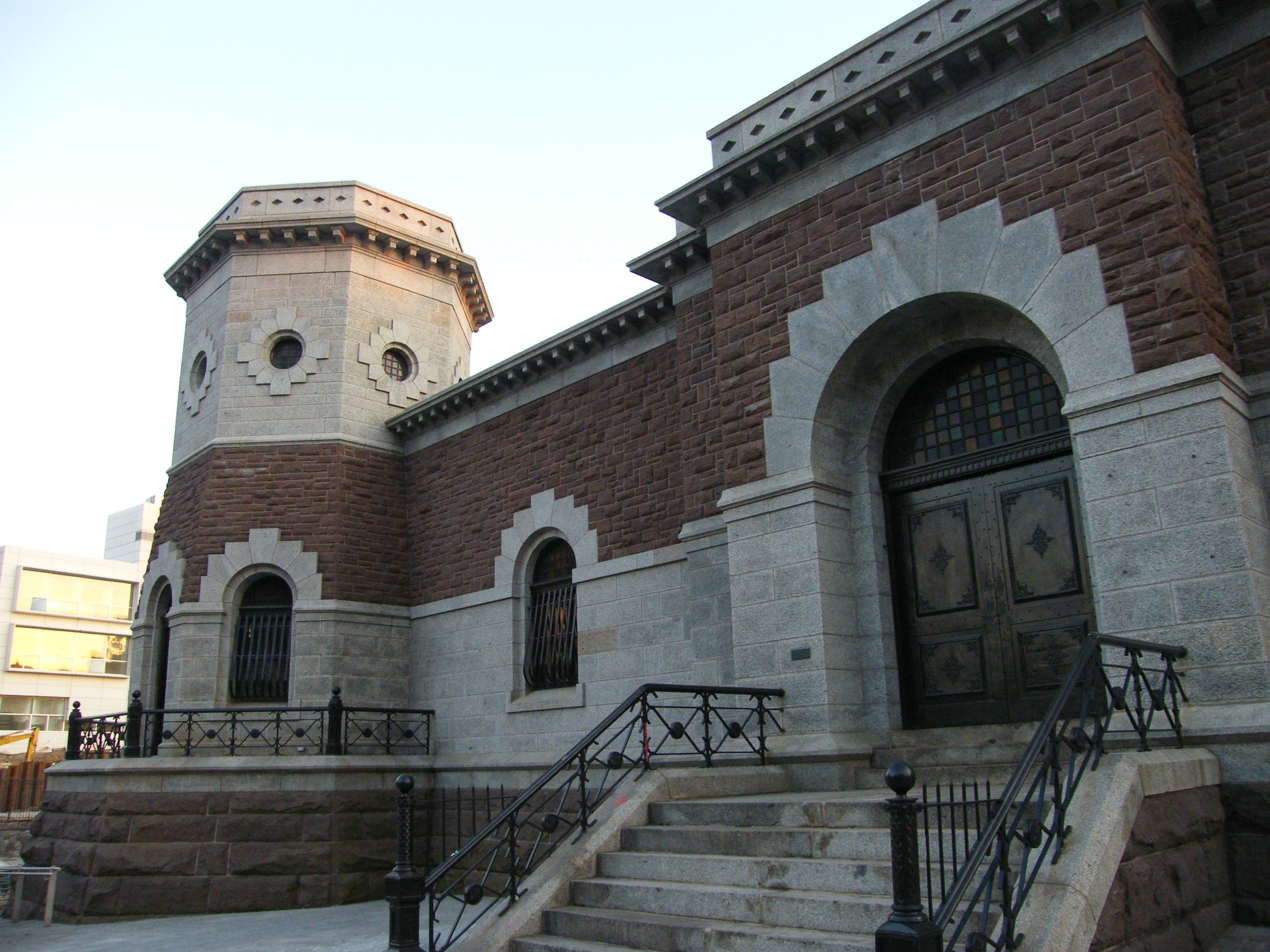
Croton Gatehouse

Artistic revitalization continued in October 2006 when The Gatehouse Theater opened as an additional facility of Aaron Davis Hall, a venue specializing in dance. It was built by rehabilitating a former 19th century Croton Aqueduct building at 135th St and Convent Avenue. Upon completion, both Aaron Davis Hall and the Gatehouse Theater evolved to share a common name, Harlem Stage.

== Demographics ==
Based on data from the 2010 United States census, the population of Manhattanville was 22,950, a decrease of 1,822 (7.4%) from the 24,772 counted in 2000. Covering an area of 248.49 acres (100.56 ha), the neighborhood had a population density of 92.4 inhabitants per acre (59,100/sq mi; 22,800/km^{2}). The racial makeup of the neighborhood was 7.5% (1,710) White, 25.8% (5,918) African American, 0.3% (77) Native American, 2.2% (496) Asian, 0.0% (5) Pacific Islander, 0.3% (76) from other races, and 1.1% (255) from two or more races. Hispanic or Latino of any race were 62.8% (14,413) of the population.

The most significant changes in the racial composition of Manhattanville were the increase in the White population by 234% (1,710), the decrease in the Black population by 22% (1,656), and the decrease in the Latino population by 9% (1,508). The Asian population also increased by 75% (212) but remained a small minority, and the very small population of all other races decreased by 14% (68).

The entirety of Community District 9, which encompasses Manhattanville. Morningside Heights, and Hamilton Heights, had 111,287 inhabitants as of NYC Health's 2018 Community Health Profile, with an average life expectancy of 81.4 years. This is about the same as the median life expectancy of 81.2 for all New York City neighborhoods. Most residents are children and middle-aged adults: 34% are between the ages of 25–44, while 21% are between 45 and 64, and 17% are between 0–17. The ratio of college-aged and elderly residents was lower, at 16% and 12% respectively.

As of 2017, the median household income in Community District 9 was $50,048, though the median income in Manhattanville individually was $41,453. In 2018, an estimated 24% of Community District 9 residents lived in poverty, compared to 14% in all of Manhattan and 20% in all of New York City. One in twelve residents (8%) were unemployed, compared to 7% in Manhattan and 9% in New York City. Rent burden, or the percentage of residents who have difficulty paying their rent, is 51% in Community District 9, compared to the boroughwide and citywide rates of 45% and 51% respectively. Based on this calculation, as of 2018, Community District 9 is considered to be gentrifying: according to the Community Health Profile, the district was low-income in 1990 and has seen above-median rent growth up to 2010.

== Sites of interest ==
=== Historic religious institutions ===
Four of Manhattanville's houses of worship are historically distinguished.

- St. Mary's Protestant Episcopal Church on West 126th Street (formerly Lawrence Street), organized in 1823, was the only church in the district (indeed, in the entire Harlem territory with the exception of the Dutch Reformed Church on the East Side) in the second quarter of the nineteenth century. Its present stone building, built in 1908–1909 by T. E. Blake and the architectural firm of Carrere & Hastings, is the church's second structure on same site of the church's original wood-frame structure, built in 1824 and consecrated in 1826. In 1831, St. Marys was the first church in the Episcopal Diocese to abolish pew rentals. The marble seal inlaid into the church porch of "Jacob Schieffelin's Vault", the burial vault in which Jacob Schieffelin and his wife Hannah Lawrence Schieffelin (who were the church's land donors as well as Manhattanville's principal founders) are interred, is clearly visible to passersby. Today St. Mary's is the oldest congregation in continuous service on its original site in the entire Harlem area. In 1998, the complex of church, its adjacent frame parish house (circa 1851) and brick school building (1890) were officially designated a New York City landmark.
- Church of the Annunciation (Roman Catholic) on Convent Avenue and West 131st Street, founded in 1854, was the first Catholic church to be built on Manhattan's west side above 2nd Street, and ministered particularly to the Irish Catholic laborers on the Hudson River Railroad. The Christian Brothers established the church building adjacent to Manhattan College, at 131st Street and the Bloomingdale Road (Old Broadway). The Brothers subsequently sold the adjoining church and rectory sites to John Hughes, the first Catholic Archbishop of New York. The present stone building, built in 1906–1907 by the architectural firm of Lynch & Orchard, is the church's second structure, to which the congregation moved from two blocks east in 1907.
- Church of St. Joseph of the Holy Family, founded in 1860 as the Church of the Holy Family by Manhattanville's German Catholic community at the northwest corner of 125th Street and Morningside Avenue. A 100th anniversary souvenir history in 1960 noted: "While the construction of the church was going on . . . on May 30, of the year 1861 was celebrated what was probably the first public Corpus Christi procession in New York City." Manhattanville historian John J. Hopper mentions this church in his circa 1920 reminiscences as "the German Catholic Church at Ninth Avenue, which my father [Isaac A. Hopper] built" during his boyhood on Manhattan Street from 1853 to 1865. (Although the AIA guide attributes the church's architecture to the Herter Brothers in 1889, the incorrect building date was probably confused that of the St. Joseph R.C. School building around the corner at 168 Morningside Avenue). David Dunlap cites this church in his book, Glory in Gotham: Manhattan's Houses of Worship, as the oldest church [building] in Harlem.
- Old Broadway Synagogue, an Orthodox Jewish synagogue incorporated in 1911 under the name Chevra Talmud Torah Anshei Marovi, was built on Old Broadway (a rare vestige on Manhattan island of the Bloomingdale Road) by the architectural firm of Meisner & Uffner in 1923. The congregation formed from the mostly Ashkenazic Jewish population of Russian and Polish immigrants to New York during the 1880s who had made their way up to Central Harlem, then migrated to blocks west. The building is listed individually on the National Register of Historic Places.

=== Other sites of interest ===
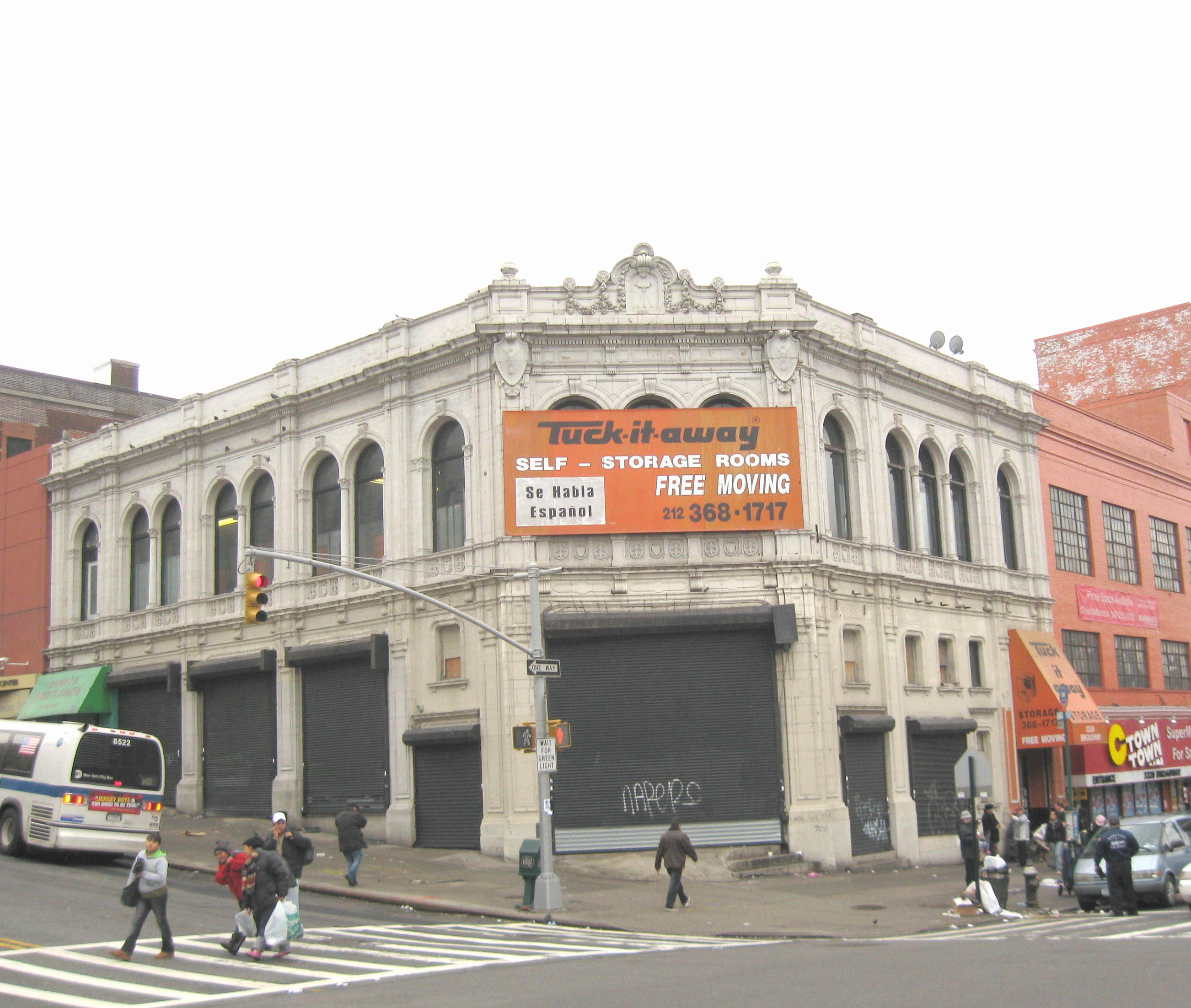
Former Claremont Theatre

Aside from Grant's Tomb, Riverside Church and the Manhattan School of Music near the southwestern corner, the principal landmarks in Manhattanville are the IRT Broadway Line and Riverside Drive Viaducts. Within the neighborhood is Manhattanville Houses, a 1,272-unit development of the New York City Housing Authority, which opened in 1961. Designed in the international "towers in the park" style by noted Swiss-born architect William Lescaze, the development was initially created to house middle income residents.

The neighborhood also contains the landmarked neo-Renaissance Claremont Theatre where Thomas Edison once shot a short film in 1915 featuring the building's entrance, the Manhattanville Bus Depot, St. Mary's Church, and the Fairway Supermarket, whose broad selections attract distant customers.

In Riverside Park, north of Grant's Tomb, is the site of the former Claremont Inn, a riverside respite and hotel for the affluent back in its heyday. It was originally built around 1775 as a private mansion and estate. By the end of the 19th century it was bought by the city of New York and leased to a hotelier. There was also a place to rent bicycles at the inn. It had a serious fire in the 1940s which caused its demise. A plan was in the making for a reuse of the inn and restaurant and grounds when yet a final fire caused its closing in 1951. A stone plaque marks where it once stood.

==== Factory District ====
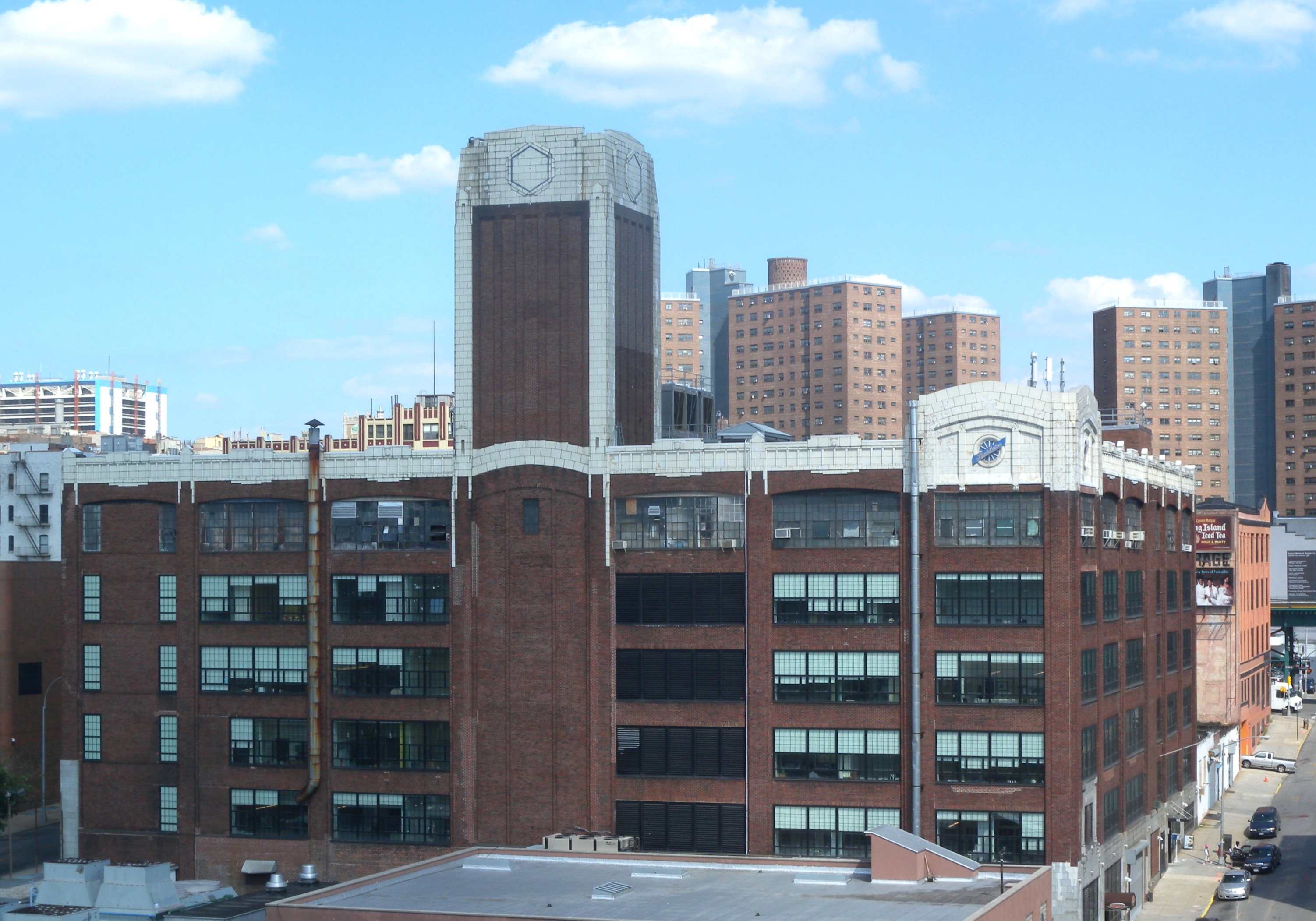
Studebaker Building

Manhattanville contains the "Factory District", a collection of former factories being redeveloped by the Janus Property Company and Cushman and Wakefield. The former factories in Manhattanville include the Mink Building, constructed in the 1880s. Janus is redeveloping the area around 126th and Amsterdam as part of the Manhattanville Factory District, converting several former factory buildings into commercial and office space.

During the 1920s, on 131st Street between Broadway and Twelfth Avenue, a Studebaker automobile factory plant made luxury cars. The building was sold in the Great Depression in the 1930s to Borden to be used as a dairy plant. In the 21st century it is used by Columbia University and has a Studebaker Cafe in it.

== Police and crime ==
Manhattanville, along with Morningside Heights, is mostly served by the 26th Precinct of the NYPD, located at 520 West 126th Street, although the area north of 133rd Street and west of Amsterdam Avenue is actually served by the 30th Precinct. The 26th Precinct has a lower crime rate than in the 1990s, with crimes across all categories having decreased by 80.6% between 1990 and 2019. The precinct reported 2 murders, 8 rapes, 128 robberies, 94 felony assaults, 70 burglaries, 334 grand larcenies, and 21 grand larcenies auto in 2019. Of the five major violent felonies (murder, rape, felony assault, robbery, and burglary), the 26th Precinct had a rate of 612 crimes per 100,000 residents in 2019, compared to the boroughwide average of 632 crimes per 100,000 and the citywide average of 572 crimes per 100,000.

As of 2018, Manhattan Community District 9 has a non-fatal assault hospitalization rate of 57 per 100,000 people, compared to the boroughwide rate of 49 per 100,000 and the citywide rate of 59 per 100,000. Its incarceration rate is 633 per 100,000 people, compared to the boroughwide rate of 407 per 100,000 and the citywide rate of 425 per 100,000.

In 2019, the highest concentration of felony assaults and robberies in Manhattanville was near the intersection of 125th Street and Saint Nicholas Avenue, where there were 14 felony assaults and 15 robberies. The area near the intersection of 135th Street and Broadway also had 13 felony assaults in 2019.

== Fire safety ==
Manhattanville is served by two New York City Fire Department (FDNY) fire stations. Engine Co. 80/Ladder Co. 23 is located at 503 West 139th Street, while Engine Co. 37/Ladder Co. 40 is located at 415 West 125th Street.

== Health ==
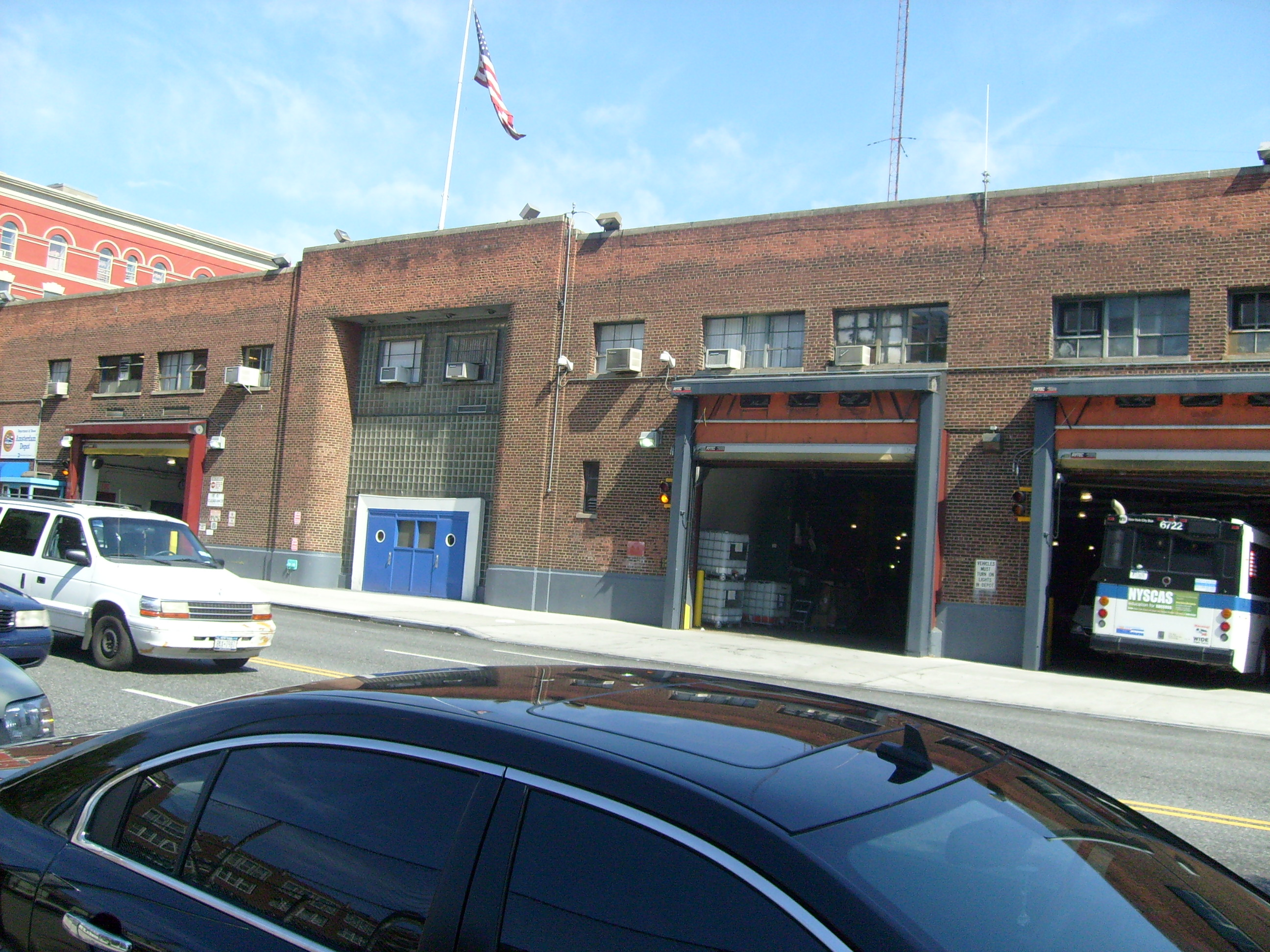
The former Amsterdam Bus Depot

As of 2018, preterm births and births to teenage mothers in Community District 9 are lower than the city average. In Community District 9, there were 82 preterm births per 1,000 live births (compared to 87 per 1,000 citywide), and 10.9 births to teenage mothers per 1,000 live births (compared to 19.3 per 1,000 citywide). Community District 9 has a low population of residents who are uninsured. In 2018, this population was estimated to be 11%, slightly less than the citywide rate of 12%.

The concentration of fine particulate matter, the deadliest type of air pollutant, in Community District 9 is 0.008 milligrams per cubic metre (8.0×10^{−9} oz/ft^{3}), more than the city average. Seventeen percent of Community District 9 residents are smokers, which is more than the city average of 14% of residents being smokers. In Community District 9, 21% of residents are obese, 10% are diabetic, and 29% have high blood pressure—compared to the citywide averages of 24%, 11%, and 28% respectively. In addition, 25% of children are obese, compared to the citywide average of 20%.

Eighty-eight percent of residents eat some fruits and vegetables every day, which is about the same as the city's average of 87%. In 2018, 83% of residents described their health as "good", "very good", or "excellent", more than the city's average of 78%. For every supermarket in Community District 9, there are 11 bodegas.

The nearest hospitals are Mount Sinai Morningside in Morningside Heights and NYC Health + Hospitals/Harlem in Harlem.

== Post offices and ZIP Codes ==
Manhattanville is located in two primary ZIP Codes. The area south of 133rd Street is part of 10027 and the area north of 133rd Street is part of 10031. The United States Postal Service operates the Manhattanville Station and Morningside Annex at 365 West 125th Street.

== Education ==
Community District 9 generally has a higher rate of college-educated residents than the rest of the city as of 2018. A plurality of residents age 25 and older (49%) have a college education or higher, while 21% have less than a high school education and 30% are high school graduates or have some college education. By contrast, 64% of Manhattan residents and 43% of city residents have a college education or higher. The percentage of Community District 9 students excelling in math rose from 25% in 2000 to 49% in 2011, and reading achievement increased from 32% to 35% during the same time period.

Community District 9's rate of elementary school student absenteeism is higher than the rest of New York City. In Community District 9, 27% of elementary school students missed twenty or more days per school year, more than the citywide average of 20%. Additionally, 65% of public high school students in Community District 9 graduate in four years, less than the citywide average of 75%.

=== Schools ===
The New York City Department of Education operates the following public schools in Manhattanville as part of Community School District 5:

- New Design Middle School (grades 6–8)
- PS 129 John H Finley (grades PK-8)
- PS 161 Pedro Albizu Campos (grades K-8)
- Teachers College Community School (grades PK-6)
- The Mott Hall School (grades 6–8)
- Urban Assembly Academy for Future Leaders (grades 6–8)
- Urban Assembly for the Performing Arts (grades 9–12)

=== Higher education ===
Columbia University's Manhattanville campus is located in the neighborhood. The campus consists of the Forum, the Lenfest Center for the Arts (including the Miriam and Ira D. Wallach Art Gallery), and the Jerome L. Greene Science Center. In addition, the Henry R. Kravis Building and the Ronald O. Perelman Center are being built as of 2018. The former was completed in 2022 by Diller Scofidio + Renfro and houses the Columbia Business School.

=== Library ===
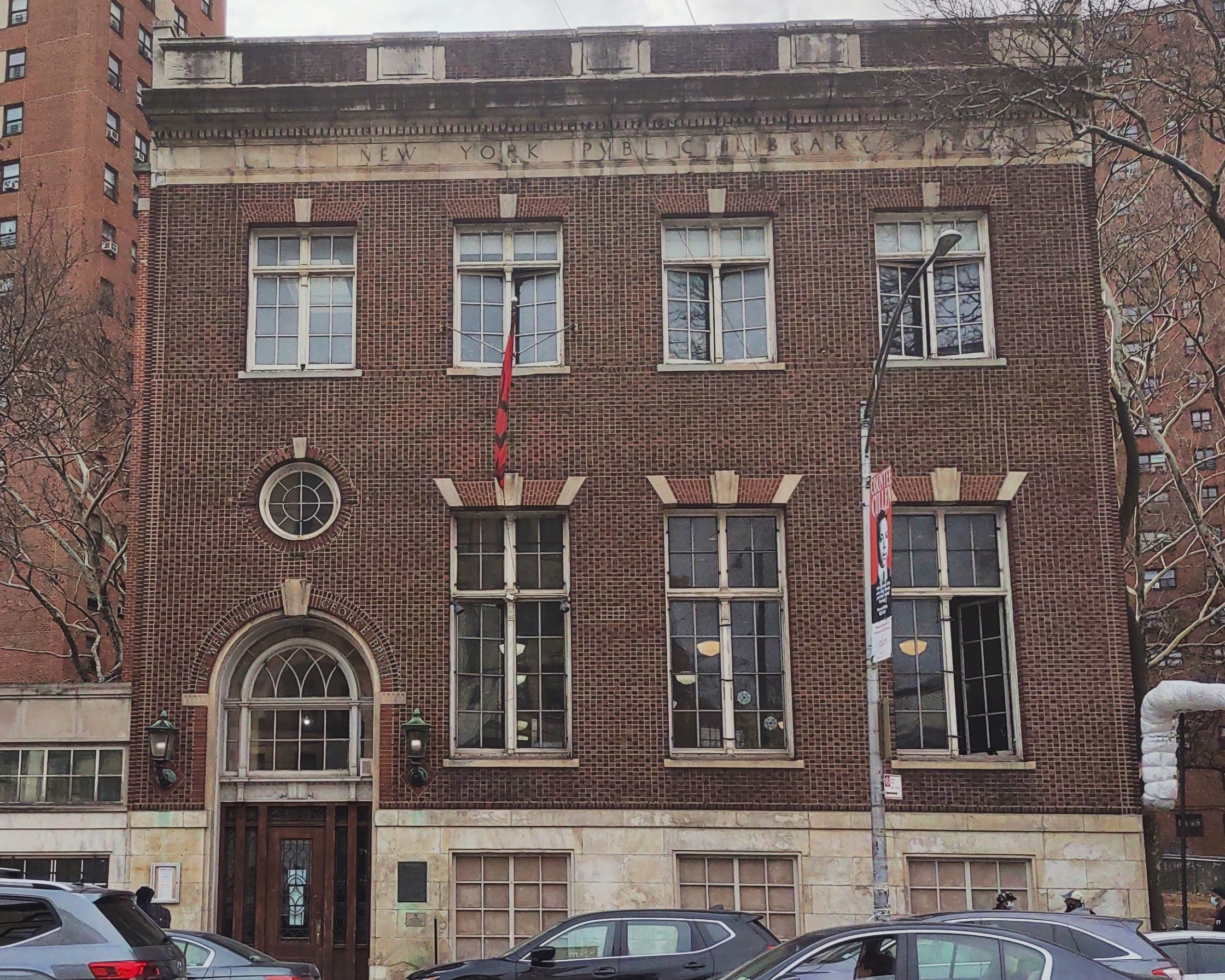
George Bruce Library

The New York Public Library (NYPL) operates the George Bruce branch at 518 West 125th Street. It is named after the inventor George Bruce, whose daughter built the original George Bruce Library at 42nd Street in 1888. The current three-story structure, designed by Carrère and Hastings, was constructed in 1915 and renovated in 2001.
