= Manhattan Community Board 9 =

Manhattan Community District 9
- Community District
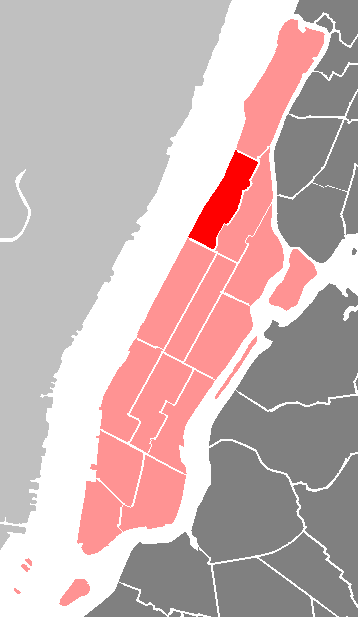
- Country: United States
- State: New York
- City: New York City
- Borough: Manhattan
- Neighborhoods: West Harlem: Hamilton Heights; Manhattanville; Morningside Heights

Government
  - Chairperson: Barry J. Weinberg
  - District Manager: Eutha R. Prince

Area
  - Land: 1.5 sq mi (3.9 km^{2})

Population (2010)
  - Total: 110,193
  - Density: 73,000/sq mi (28,000/km^{2})

Ethnicity
  - Hispanic and Latino Americans: 38.8%
  - African-American: 21.5%
  - White: 27.6%
  - Asian: 8.8%
  - Others: 3.3%
- Time zone: UTC−5 (Eastern)
  - Summer (DST): UTC−4 (EDT)
- ZIP codes: 10025, 10026, 10027, 10030, 10031
- Area code: 212, 646, and 332, and 917
- Police Precinct: 26th (website); 30th (website)
- Website: www.cb9m.org

The Manhattan Community Board 9 is a New York City community board encompassing the neighborhoods of Hamilton Heights, Manhattanville, and Morningside Heights in the borough of Manhattan. It is delimited by Edgecombe Avenue, Bradhurst Avenue, Saint Nicholas Avenue, the 123rd Street and Morningside Avenue on the east, Cathedral Parkway on the south, the Hudson River on the west and 155th Street on the north.

Three well known sub-areas are Sugar Hill at the northeast corner of Hamilton Heights overlooking Jackie Robinson Park; Vinegar Hill at the northeast corner of Manhattanville and the home of City College of New York overlooking St. Nicholas Park, and Cathedral Heights at the southeast tip of Morningside Heights is home to the Cathedral of St. John the Divine and overlooks Morningside Park.

Its current chair is Padmore John, and its district manager Eutha Prince.

== Demographics ==
As of 2000, the Community Board has a population of 111,724 up from 106,978 in 1990 and 103,037 in 1980.

Of them (as of 2000), 19,837 (17.8%) are White non-Hispanic, 34,924 (31.3%) are African-American, 5,751 (5.1%) Asian or Pacific Islander, 272 (0.2%) American Indian or Native Alaskan, 398 (0.4%) of some other race, 2,309 (2.1%) of two or more race, 48,233 (43.2%) of Hispanic origins.

39.4% of the population benefit from public assistance as of 2004, up from 27.4% in 2000.
The land area is 964.1 acres, or 1.51 square miles (3.90 km²).
