= 215th Street station =

New York City Subway station in Manhattan

215 Street
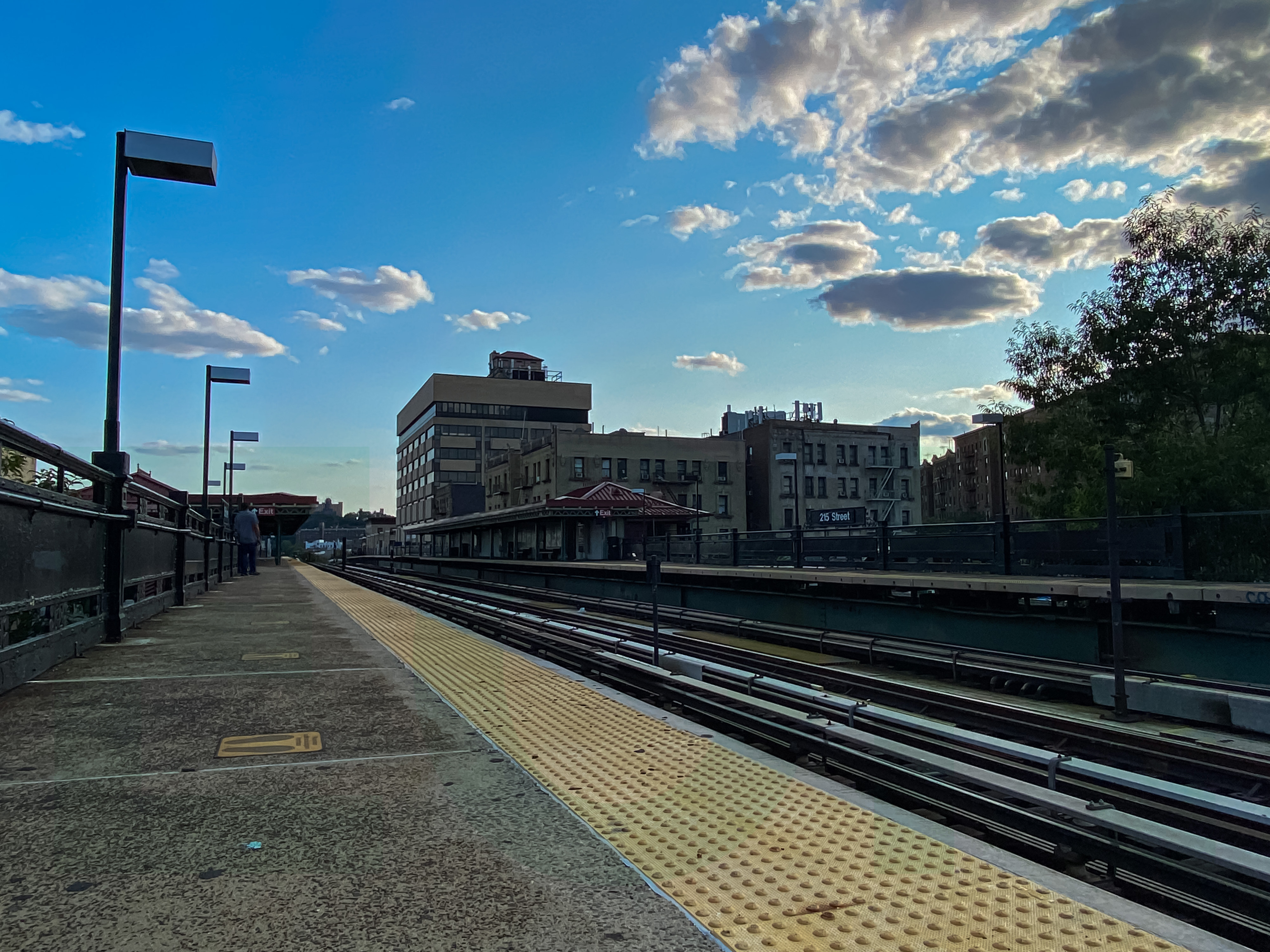
- Facing southbound viewing the station

Station statistics
- Address: West 215th Street & 10th Avenue; New York, New York
- Borough: Manhattan
- Locale: Inwood
- Coordinates: 40.869473°N 73.915074°W
- Division: A (IRT)
- Line: IRT Broadway–Seventh Avenue Line
- Services: 1 (all times)
- Transit: NYCT Bus: M100, Bx7, Bx20
- Structure: Elevated
- Platforms: 2 side platforms
- Tracks: 3 (2 in regular service)

Other information
- Opened: March 12, 1906 (120 years ago)

Traffic
- 2025: 508,066 ▲2.7%
- Rank: 393 out of 423
Services
Preceding station	New York City Subway	Following station
Marble Hill–225th Street toward Van Cortlandt Park–242nd Street	Local	207th Street toward South Ferry
Non-revenue services and lines
Preceding station	New York City Subway	Following station
221st Street demolished	no service	
Location
Location within New York City Subway
Location within New York City
Location within New York
Track layout
Street map
Station service legend
Symbol	Description
Stops all times	Stops all times

The 215th Street station is a local station on the IRT Broadway–Seventh Avenue Line of the New York City Subway. Located at the intersection of 215th Street and Tenth Avenue in the Manhattan neighborhood of Inwood, it is served by the 1 train at all times. It is the northernmost subway station in the system on Manhattan Island.

Built by the Interborough Rapid Transit Company (IRT), the station opened on March 12, 1906, as part of the first subway. The northbound platform was lengthened in 1910 while the southbound platform was lengthened in 1948.

== History ==
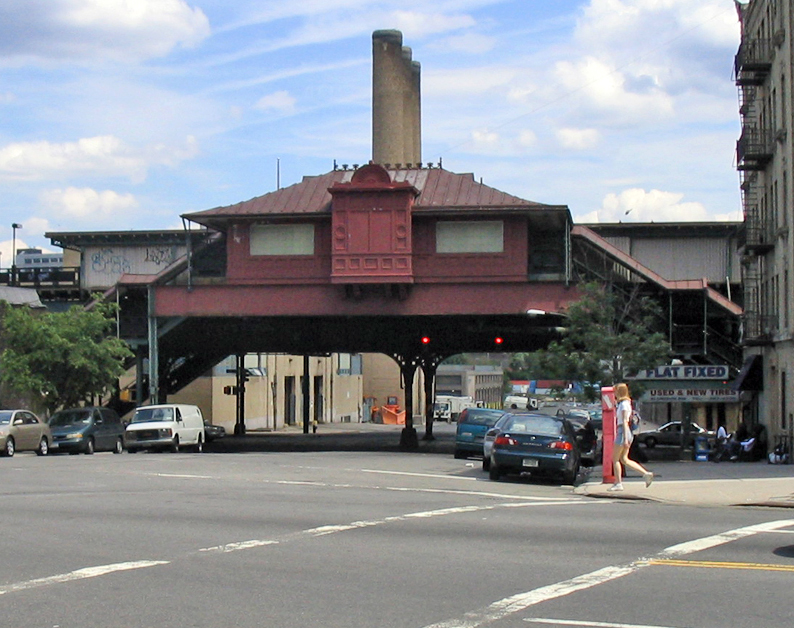
Street level view

The West Side Branch of the first subway was extended northward to a temporary terminus of 221st Street and Broadway on March 12, 1906 with the first open station at Dyckman Street, as the stations at 168th Street, 181st Street, and 191st Street were not yet completed. This extension was served by shuttle trains operating between 157th Street and 221st Street until May 30, 1906, when express trains began running through to 221st Street.

To address overcrowding, in 1909, the New York Public Service Commission proposed lengthening the platforms at stations along the original IRT subway. As part of a modification to the IRT's construction contracts made on January 18, 1910, the company was to lengthen station platforms to accommodate ten-car express and six-car local trains. In addition to $1.5 million (equivalent to $51.8 million in 2025) spent on platform lengthening, $500,000 (equivalent to $17.3 million in 2025) was spent on building additional entrances and exits. It was anticipated that these improvements would increase capacity by 25 percent. The northbound platform at the 215th Street station was extended 50 feet (15 m) at both its north and south ends. The southbound platform was not lengthened. Six-car local trains began operating in October 1910, and ten-car express trains began running on the West Side Line on January 24, 1911. Subsequently, the station could accommodate six-car local trains, but ten-car express trains could not open some of their doors.

The city government took over the IRT's operations on June 12, 1940. Platforms at IRT Broadway–Seventh Avenue Line stations between 103rd Street and 238th Street, including those at 215th Street, were lengthened to 514 feet (157 m) between 1946 and 1948, allowing full ten-car express trains to stop at these stations. A contract for the platform extensions at 215th Street and five other stations on the line was awarded to the Rao Electrical Equipment Company and the Kaplan Electric Company in June 1946. The platform extensions at these stations were opened in stages. On July 9, 1948, the platform extensions at stations between 207th Street and 238th Street, including the 215th Street station, were opened for use at the cost of $423,000. At the same time, the IRT routes were given numbered designations with the introduction of "R-type" rolling stock, which contained rollsigns with numbered designations for each service. The route to 242nd Street became known as the 1.

In 1969, the station's wooden platforms were replaced with concrete ones.

The station was renovated by an in-house crew of New York City Transit Authority employees in 1990.

From January 5 to December 20, 2019, a free out-of-system transfer was provided from this station to Inwood–207th Street to accommodate the temporary closure of the IRT platforms at 168th Street, where a free transfer was normally provided. A similar transfer was also provided one station south at 207th Street.

== Station layout ==
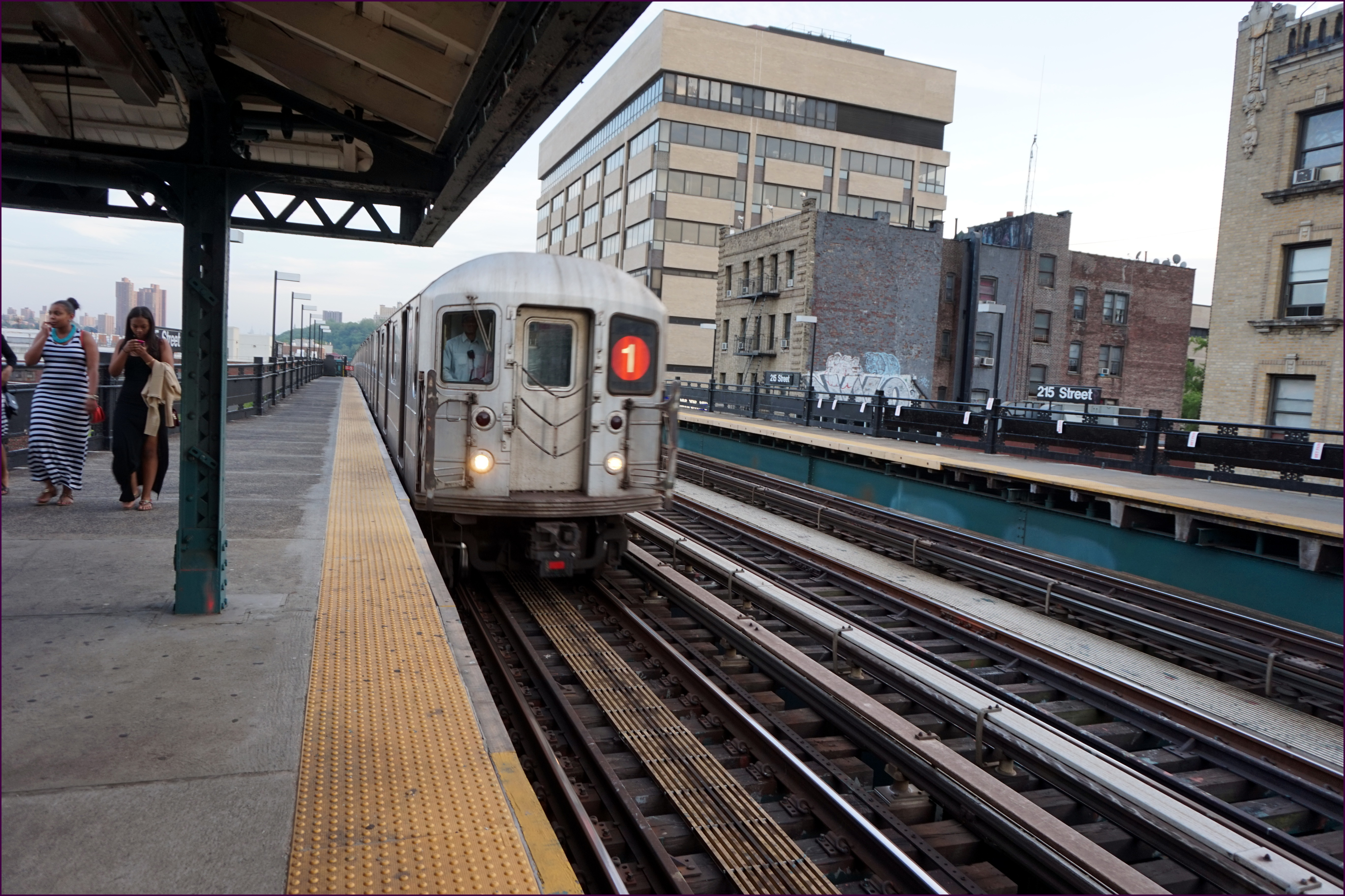
Northbound 1 train entering the station

This elevated station has two side platforms and three tracks with the center track not used in revenue service. The station is served by the 1 at all times and is between Marble Hill–225th Street to the north and 207th Street to the south. Both platforms have beige windscreens and dark canopies in the center, which were replaced as part of a renovation project in 2012. At either ends of the platforms, black steel waist-high fences are installed. The station name plates are in the standard black with white lettering.

The 1991 artwork here is called Elevated Nature I-IV by Wopo Holup. It consists of two concrete panels with wooden frames on the southbound platform's station house. Each panel consists of eight squares depicting tree limbs. This artwork is also located at four other stations on this line.

The station is near the northern end of the 207th Street Yard, which includes the 215th Street Signal Shop, and the MTA Buses Kingsbridge Depot which is just slightly north of this station. It is also four blocks along 218th Street from Inwood Hill Park and, also on 218th Street, provides access to Columbia University's Baker Field athletic complex, as well as the Allen Hospital, a satellite facility of NewYork–Presbyterian Hospital. North of the station, the line crosses over the Harlem River Ship Canal via the Broadway Bridge into the mainland of New York.

=== Exits ===
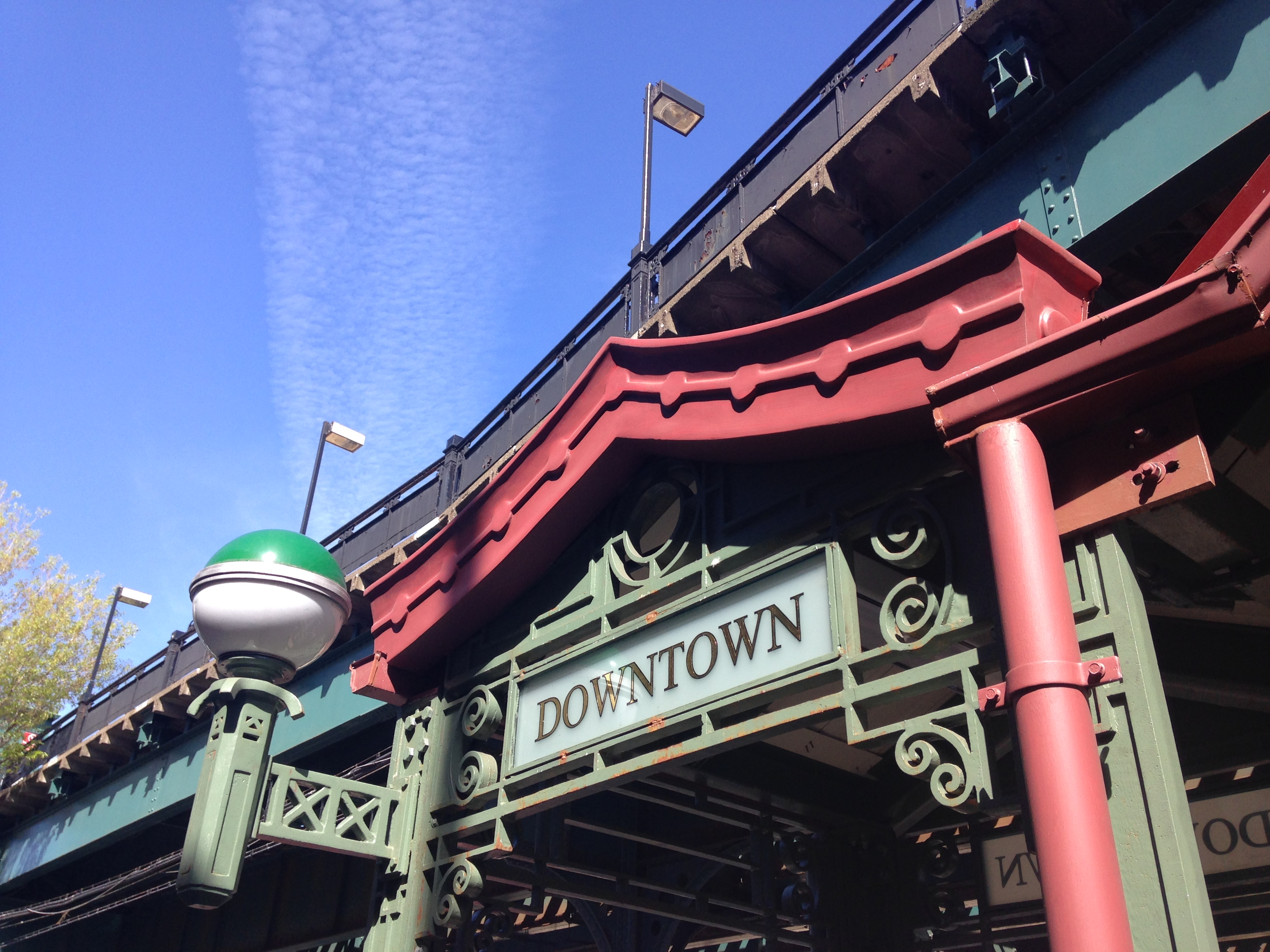
View of one of the staircases to the southbound platform

Both platforms have one wooden adjacent station house in the center. However, only the southbound one is used for passenger service. Three doors from the platform lead to a small waiting area, where a turnstile bank provides access to and from the station. Outside fare control, there is a token booth and two staircases going down to either western corners of Tenth Avenue and 215th Street.

The station house on the northbound platform is used for employees only. One exit-only turnstile at platform level leads to a staircase that goes down to the northeast corner of 215th Street and Tenth Avenue while a High Entry/Exit Turnstile, also at platform level, leads to a staircase going down to the southeast corner.

== Ridership ==
In 2018, the station had 553,050 boardings, making it the 402nd most used station in the 424-station system. This amounted to an average of 1,787 passengers per weekday. In terms of annual passenger ridership and in terms of weekday daily ridership, this is the least used station in Manhattan.
