= 238th Street station =

New York City Subway station in the Bronx

238 Street
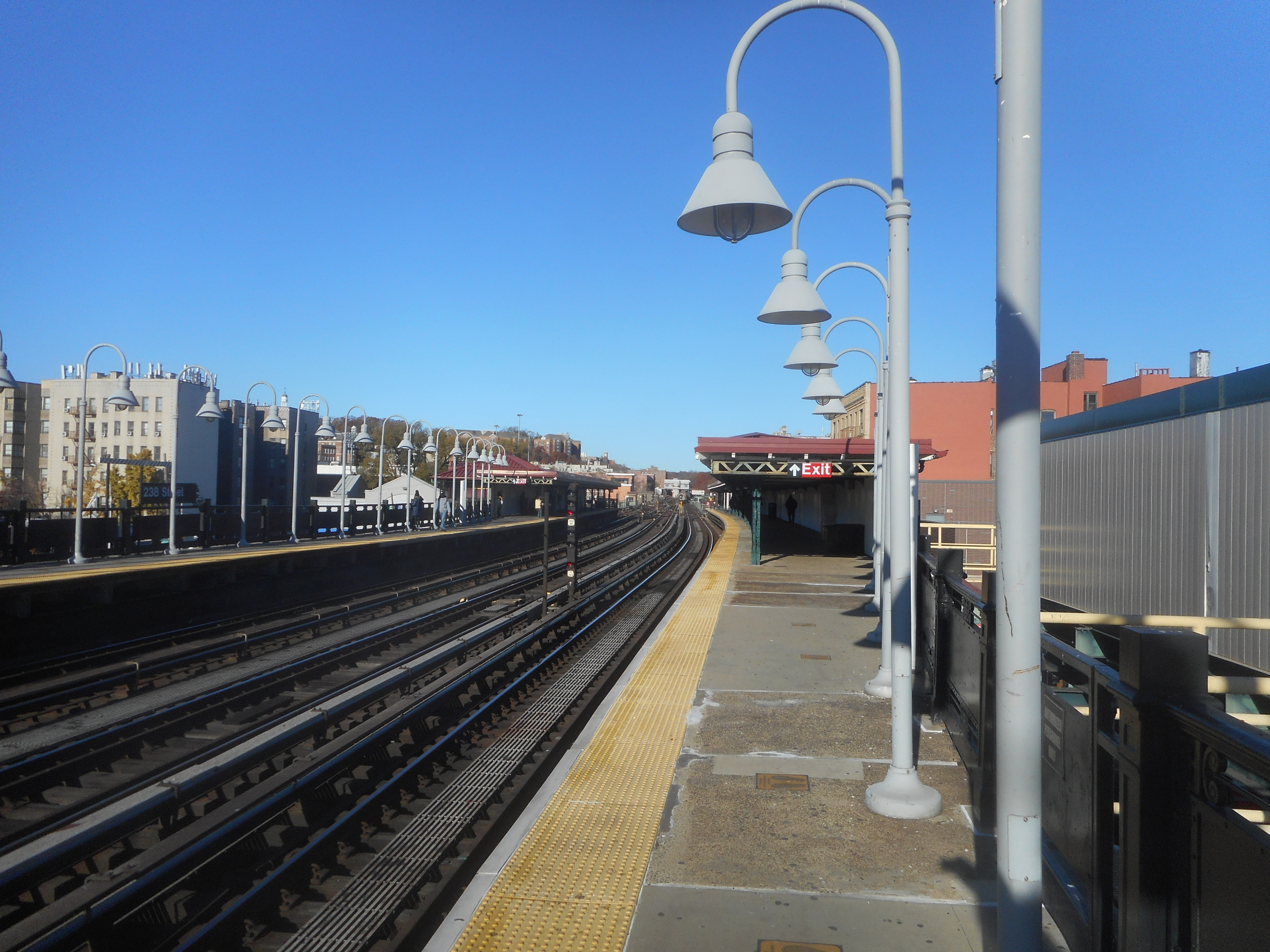
- View from the northbound platform, looking north

Station statistics
- Address: West 238th Street & Broadway, Bronx, New York
- Borough: The Bronx
- Locale: Kingsbridge
- Coordinates: 40°53′6.35″N 73°54′2.19″W
- Division: A (IRT)
- Line: IRT Broadway–Seventh Avenue Line
- Services: 1 (all times)
- Transit: NYCT Bus: Bx3, Bx9
- Structure: Elevated
- Platforms: 2 side platforms
- Tracks: 3 (2 in regular service)

Other information
- Opened: August 1, 1908 (118 years ago)

Traffic
- 2025: 1,023,369 ▲10.7%
- Rank: 305 out of 423
Services
Preceding station	New York City Subway	Following station
Van Cortlandt Park–242nd Street Terminus	Local	231st Street toward South Ferry
Location
Location within New York City Subway
Location within New York City
Location within New York
Track layout
Street map
Station service legend
Symbol	Description
Stops all times	Stops all times

The 238th Street station is a local station on the IRT Broadway–Seventh Avenue Line of the New York City Subway. Located at the intersection of 238th Street and Broadway in the Kingsbridge neighborhood of the Bronx, it is served by the 1 train at all times.

Built by the Interborough Rapid Transit Company (IRT), the station opened on August 1, 1908, as part of the first subway. The northbound platform was lengthened in 1910 while the southbound platform was lengthened in 1948. In 2018, the fare controls at the station were changed to allow entries in the northbound direction.

== History ==
=== Construction and opening ===
Planning for a subway line in New York City dates to 1864, but development of what became the city's first subway line did not start until 1894, when the New York State Legislature passed the Rapid Transit Act. The subway plans were drawn up by a team of engineers led by William Barclay Parsons, the Rapid Transit Commission's chief engineer. It called for a subway line from New York City Hall in lower Manhattan to the Upper West Side, where two branches would lead north into the Bronx. A plan was formally adopted in 1897, and all legal conflicts over the route alignment were resolved near the end of 1899.

The Rapid Transit Construction Company, organized by John B. McDonald and funded by August Belmont Jr., signed the initial Contract 1 with the Rapid Transit Commission in February 1900, under which it would construct the subway and maintain a 50-year operating lease from the opening of the line. In 1901, the firm of Heins & LaFarge was hired to design the underground stations. Belmont incorporated the Interborough Rapid Transit Company (IRT) in April 1902 to operate the subway.

Operation of the first subway began on October 27, 1904, with the opening of all stations from City Hall to 145th Street on the West Side Branch. The line was mostly underground, except for the section surrounding 125th Street, which ran across the elevated Manhattan Valley Viaduct to cross a deep valley there. Service was extended to 157th Street on November 12, 1904, as that station's opening had been delayed because of painting and plastering work.

The West Side Branch was extended northward to a temporary terminus at 221st Street and Broadway on March 12, 1906 served by shuttle trains operating between 157th Street and 221st Street. However, only the Dyckman Street, 215th Street, and 221st Street stations opened on that date as the other stations were not yet completed. The 168th Street station opened on April 14, 1906. The 181st Street station opened on May 30, 1906, and on that date express trains on the Broadway branch began running through to 221st Street, eliminating the need to transfer at 157th Street to shuttles. The original system as included in Contract 1 was completed on January 14, 1907, when trains started running across the Harlem Ship Canal on the Broadway Bridge to 225th Street, and the nearby 221st Street station was closed.

Once the line was extended to 225th Street on January 14, 1907, the 221st Street platforms were dismantled and moved to 230th Street for a new temporary terminus. Service was extended to the temporary terminus at 230th Street on January 27, 1907. An extension of Contract 1 north to 242nd Street at Van Cortlandt Park was approved in 1906 and opened on August 1, 1908, along with the 238th Street station.

After the first subway line was completed in 1908, the station was served by West Side local and express trains. Express trains began at South Ferry in Manhattan or Atlantic Avenue in Brooklyn, and ended at 242nd Street in the Bronx. Local trains ran from City Hall to 242nd Street during rush hours, continuing south from City Hall to South Ferry at other times. In 1918, the Broadway–Seventh Avenue Line opened south of Times Square–42nd Street, and the original line was divided into an H-shaped system. The original subway north of Times Square thus became part of the Broadway–Seventh Avenue Line. Local trains were sent to South Ferry, while express trains used the new Clark Street Tunnel to Brooklyn.

=== Station renovations ===
To address overcrowding, in 1909, the New York Public Service Commission proposed lengthening the platforms at stations along the original IRT subway. As part of a modification to the IRT's construction contracts made on January 18, 1910, the company was to lengthen station platforms to accommodate ten-car express and six-car local trains. In addition to $1.5 million (equivalent to $51.8 million in 2025) spent on platform lengthening, $500,000 (equivalent to $17.3 million in 2025) was spent on building additional entrances and exits. It was anticipated that these improvements would increase capacity by 25 percent. The northbound platform at the 238th Street station was extended 200 feet (61 m) to the south, while the southbound platform was not lengthened. Six-car local trains began operating in October 1910, and ten-car express trains began running on the West Side Line on January 24, 1911. Subsequently, the station could accommodate six-car local trains, but ten-car trains could not open some of their doors.

The city government took over the IRT's operations on June 12, 1940. Platforms at IRT Broadway–Seventh Avenue Line stations between 103rd Street and 238th Street were lengthened to 514 feet (157 m) between 1946 and 1948, allowing full ten-car express trains to stop at these stations. A contract for the platform extensions at 238th Street and five other stations on the line was awarded to the Rao Electrical Equipment Company and the Kaplan Electric Company in June 1946. The platform extensions at these stations were opened in stages. On July 9, 1948, the platform extensions at stations between 207th Street and 238th Street were opened for use at the cost of $423,000. At the same time, the IRT routes were given numbered designations with the introduction of "R-type" rolling stock, which contained rollsigns with numbered designations for each service. The route to 242nd Street became known as the 1.

Between September 4, 2018, and January 2, 2019, Manhattan-bound trains did not stop at this station due to stairway replacement. In preparation for this, the northbound platform's fare control was converted so that it could accommodate both entries and exits.

== Station layout ==
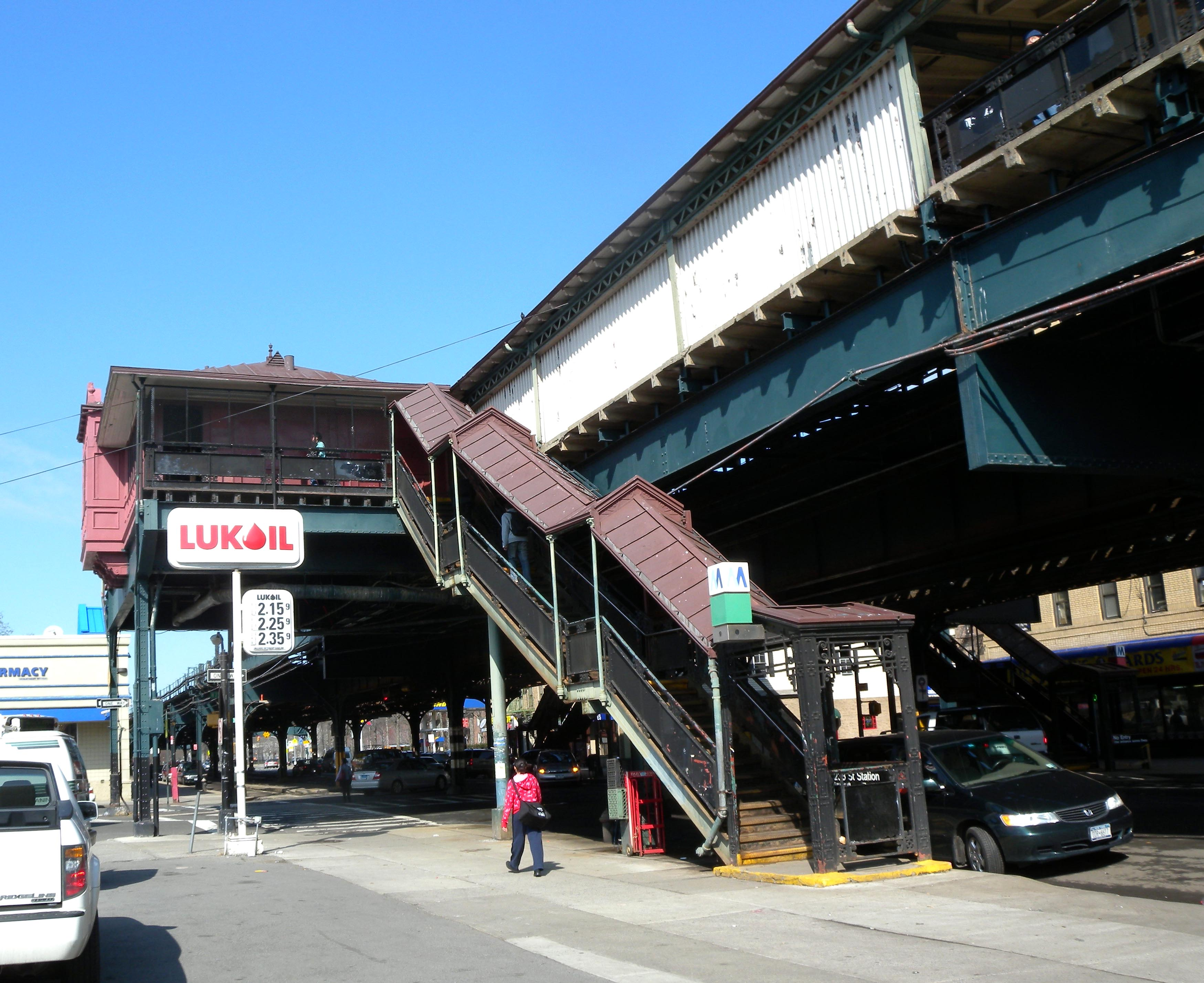
Southwestern stair

This elevated station has two side platforms and three tracks, with the center one not used in revenue service. The station is served by the 1 at all times and is between Van Cortlandt Park–242nd Street to the north and 231st Street to the south. Each platform has beige windscreens and red canopies with green roofs in the center and black waist-high fences on either side.

North of this station is the 240th Street Yard, where cars assigned to the 1 route are inspected and maintained. The yard has a footbridge to the tracks of the IRT Broadway–Seventh Avenue Line, crossovers and leads that allow this station to serve as a terminal. During the morning and afternoon rush-hours, some 1 trains begin their trips here as direct put-ins from the nearby 240th Street Yard, and some morning and afternoon rush-hour 1 trains end their trips either here or at 215th Street and drop-out and lay-up at the 240th Street Yard to prevent congestion at Van Cortlandt Park–242nd Street, which is the next and last stop on the 1 train to the north.

=== Exits ===
The northbound platform was originally exit only since 242nd Street is a short walking distance north, containing two platform-level turnstiles, each of which leads to a staircase that goes down to either eastern corner of 238th Street and Broadway. The Manhattan-bound platform has an adjacent elevated station house that contains a turnstile bank, token booth, and a single street stair going down to the southwest corner of 238th Street and Broadway.
