= 215th Street =

215th Street may refer to:

- 215th Street (MVTA station), Minnesota
- 215th Street (IRT Broadway – Seventh Avenue Line), New York City Subway
