= Dyckman Street station (IRT Broadway–Seventh Avenue Line) =

New York City Subway station in Manhattan

Dyckman Street
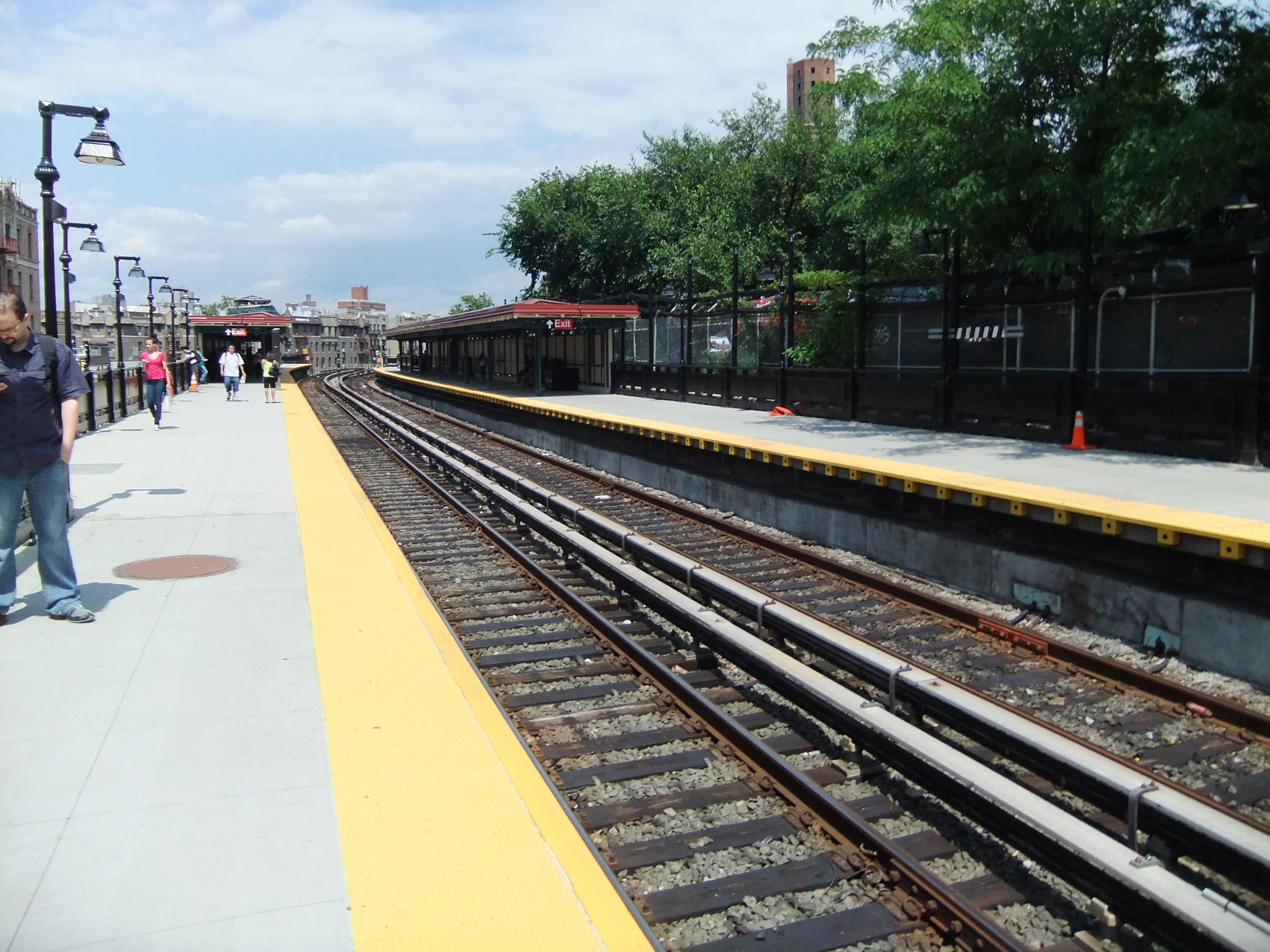
- Station platforms, view from southbound platform

Station statistics
- Address: Dyckman Street and Nagle Avenue; New York, New York
- Borough: Manhattan
- Locale: Inwood
- Coordinates: 40.861°N 73.925°W
- Division: A (IRT)
- Line: IRT Broadway–Seventh Avenue Line
- Services: 1 (all times)
- Transit: NYCT Bus: M100; MTA Bus: BxM1
- Structure: Embankment / At-Grade
- Platforms: 2 side platforms
- Tracks: 2

Other information
- Opened: March 12, 1906; 120 years ago
- Accessible: Yes

Traffic
- 2025: 1,657,235 ▲12.9%
- Rank: 211 out of 423
Services
Preceding station	New York City Subway	Following station
207th Street toward Van Cortlandt Park–242nd Street	1 (New York City Subway service)	191st Street toward South Ferry
Non-revenue services and lines
Preceding station	New York City Subway	Following station
Van Cortlandt Park–242nd Street express	no service	
Location
Location within New York City Subway
Location within New York City
Location within New York
Track layout
Street map
Station service legend
Symbol	Description
Stops all times	Stops all times
- Dyckman Street Subway Station (IRT)
- U.S. National Register of Historic Places
- U.S. Historic district – Contributing property
- New York State Register of Historic Places
- Part of: Dominican Historic District (ID100011048)
- MPS: New York City Subway System MPS
- NRHP reference No.: 04001021
- NYSRHP No.: 06101.007636

Significant dates
- Added to NRHP: September 17, 2004
- Designated CP: January 24, 2025
- Designated NYSRHP: July 20, 2004

The Dyckman Street station (pronounced DIKE-man) is a station on the IRT Broadway–Seventh Avenue Line of the New York City Subway. Located roughly at the intersection of Dyckman Street and Nagle Avenue in the Inwood neighborhood of Manhattan, it is served by the 1 train at all times.

Built by the Interborough Rapid Transit Company (IRT), the station opened on March 12, 1906, as part of the first subway. The northbound platform was lengthened in 1910 while the southbound platform was lengthened in 1948. The station house under the platforms was renovated in 1991. The station was renovated in 2014, during which the southbound platform was retrofitted with an elevator to comply with the Americans with Disabilities Act of 1990. The northbound platform was made accessible in 2023.

The Dyckman Street station contains two side platforms and two tracks. The platforms contain stairs to the station house at Dyckman Street and Nagle Avenue. The station is listed on the National Register of Historic Places.

== History ==
=== Construction and opening ===
Planning for a subway line in New York City dates to 1864, but development of what became the city's first subway line did not start until 1894, when the New York State Legislature passed the Rapid Transit Act. The subway plans were drawn up by a team of engineers led by William Barclay Parsons, the Rapid Transit Commission's chief engineer. It called for a subway line from New York City Hall in lower Manhattan to the Upper West Side, where two branches would lead north into the Bronx. A plan was formally adopted in 1897, and legal challenges were resolved near the end of 1899.

The Rapid Transit Construction Company, organized by John B. McDonald and funded by August Belmont Jr., signed the initial Contract 1 with the Rapid Transit Commission in February 1900, under which it would construct the subway and maintain a 50-year operating lease from the opening of the line. Belmont incorporated the Interborough Rapid Transit Company (IRT) in April 1902 to operate the subway.

The Dyckman Street station was constructed as part of the IRT's West Side Line (now the Broadway–Seventh Avenue Line) north of Hillside Avenue. Work on this section was conducted by E. P. Roberts and Terry & Tench Construction Company, who started building the viaduct on January 19, 1903. The West Side Branch of the first subway was extended northward to a temporary terminus of 221st Street and Broadway on March 12, 1906, with the first open station at Dyckman Street, as the stations at 168th Street, 181st Street, and 191st Street were not yet completed. This extension was served by shuttle trains operating between 157th Street and 221st Street until May 30, 1906, when express trains began running through to 221st Street. The opening of the first subway line, and particularly the Dyckman Street station, helped contribute to the development of Upper Manhattan.

After the first subway line was completed in 1908, the station was served by West Side local and express trains. Express trains began at South Ferry in Manhattan or Atlantic Avenue in Brooklyn, and ended at 242nd Street in the Bronx. Local trains ran from City Hall to 242nd Street during rush hours, continuing south from City Hall to South Ferry at other times. In 1918, the Broadway–Seventh Avenue Line opened south of Times Square–42nd Street, and the original line was divided into an H-shaped system. The original subway north of Times Square thus became part of the Broadway–Seventh Avenue Line. Local trains were sent to South Ferry, while express trains used the new Clark Street Tunnel to Brooklyn.

=== Station improvements ===
==== Early and mid-20th century ====
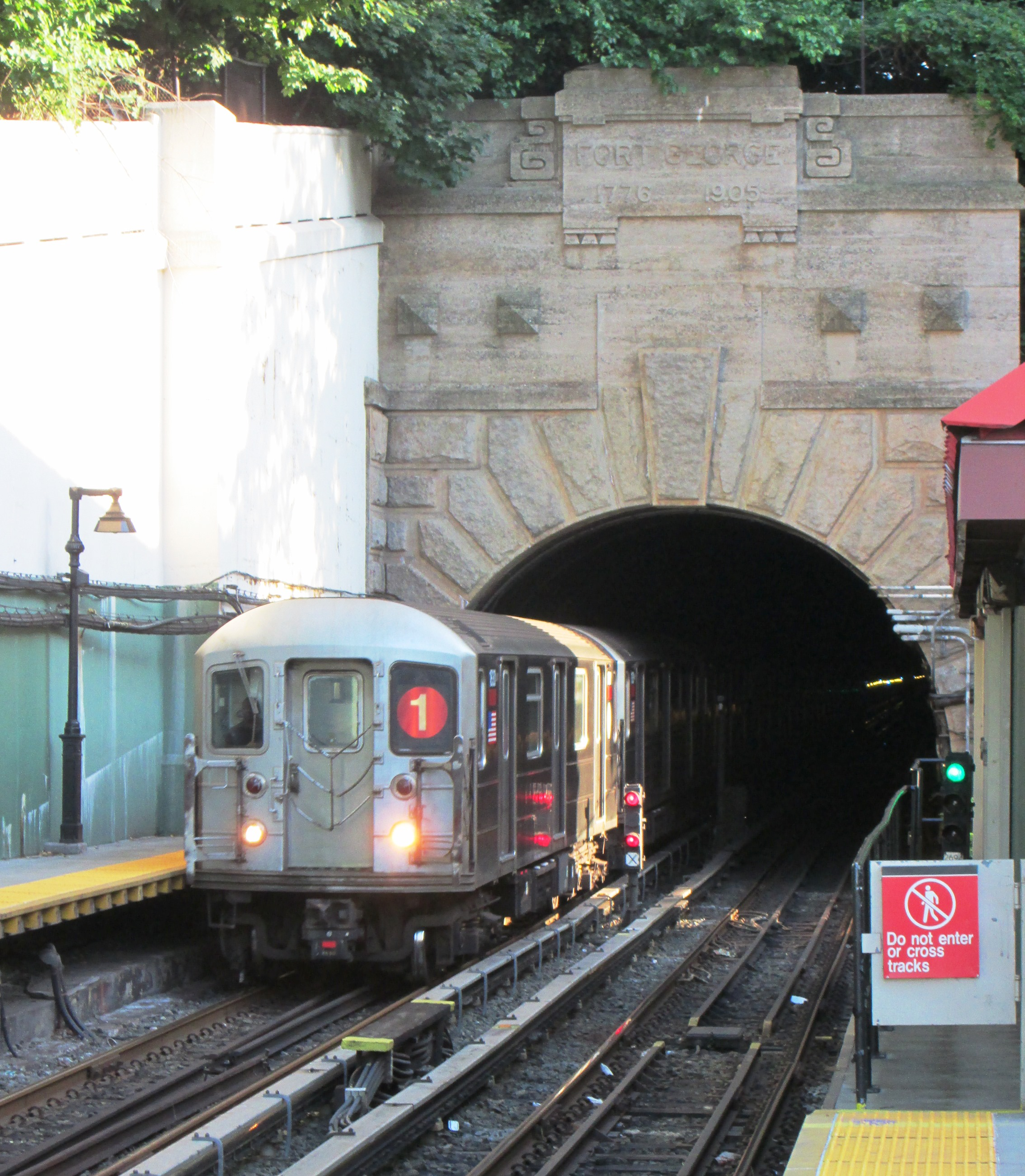
A northbound 1 train exits the tunnel portal just south of the station. The northbound platform, at left, was extended between 1910 and 1911.

To address overcrowding, in 1909, the New York Public Service Commission proposed lengthening the platforms at stations along the original IRT subway. As part of a modification to the IRT's construction contracts made on January 18, 1910, the company was to lengthen station platforms to accommodate ten-car express and six-car local trains. In addition to $1.5 million (equivalent to $51.8 million in 2025) spent on platform lengthening, $500,000 (equivalent to $17.3 million in 2025) was spent on building additional entrances and exits. It was anticipated that these improvements would increase capacity by 25 percent. The northbound platform at the Dyckman Street station was extended 100 feet (30 m) to the south, with a new retaining wall being constructed. The southbound platform was not lengthened. Six-car local trains began operating in October 1910, and ten-car express trains began running on the West Side Line on January 24, 1911. Subsequently, the station could accommodate six-car local trains, but ten-car trains could not open some of their doors.

The city government took over the IRT's operations on June 12, 1940. Platforms at IRT Broadway–Seventh Avenue Line stations between 103rd Street and 238th Street, including those at Dyckman Street, were lengthened to 514 feet (157 m) between 1946 and 1948, allowing full ten-car express trains to stop at these stations. A contract for the platform extensions at Dyckman Street and eight other stations on the line was awarded to Spencer, White & Prentis Inc. in October 1946, with an estimated cost of $3.891 million. The platform extensions at these stations were opened in stages. On April 6, 1948, the platform extension at Dyckman Street opened. At the same time, the IRT routes were given numbered designations with the introduction of "R-type" rolling stock, which contained rollsigns with numbered designations for each service. The route to 242nd Street became known as the 1.

==== Late 20th century to present ====
In April 1988, the New York City Transit Authority (NYCTA) unveiled plans to speed up service on the Broadway–Seventh Avenue Line through the implementation of a skip-stop service: the 9 train. When skip-stop service began on August 21, 1989, skip-stop service was implemented during rush hours and middays. Dyckman Street was served by the 1 at all times. On September 4, 1994, midday skip-stop service was discontinued. Skip-stop service ended on May 27, 2005, as a result of a decrease in the number of riders who benefited.

The control house was renovated between 1990 and 1991. The station was listed on the National Register of Historic Places on September 17, 2004.

Starting in 2010, the station was renovated as part of a $45 million project. The project included rehabilitation of the tunnel portal, realignment and rehabilitation of the platforms and installation of new cast iron lighting fixtures. Initially, no elevators were planned for the Dyckman Street station because it was not on the MTA's list of "key stations" that would receive disabled access under the Americans with Disabilities Act of 1990 (ADA). The United Spinal Association subsequently filed a lawsuit to stop the project because it did not include elevators. The suit was settled in 2011, and an elevator to the southbound platform was built. The project was completed in February 2014.

Originally, no elevator was added to the northbound platform because, at the time the southbound elevator was built, the geology was determined to be too difficult to accommodate an elevator there. The unidirectional accessibility received complaints from disabled riders, who were forced to backtrack several stations if they wanted to exit or enter the station northbound. Northbound accessibility was proposed in February 2019 as part of the MTA's "Fast Forward" program. A contract for the northbound elevator was awarded in December 2020, with funding that was originally earmarked for the Penn Station Access project. The new elevator was almost complete by early 2023, and it went into service in July 2023.

== Station layout ==
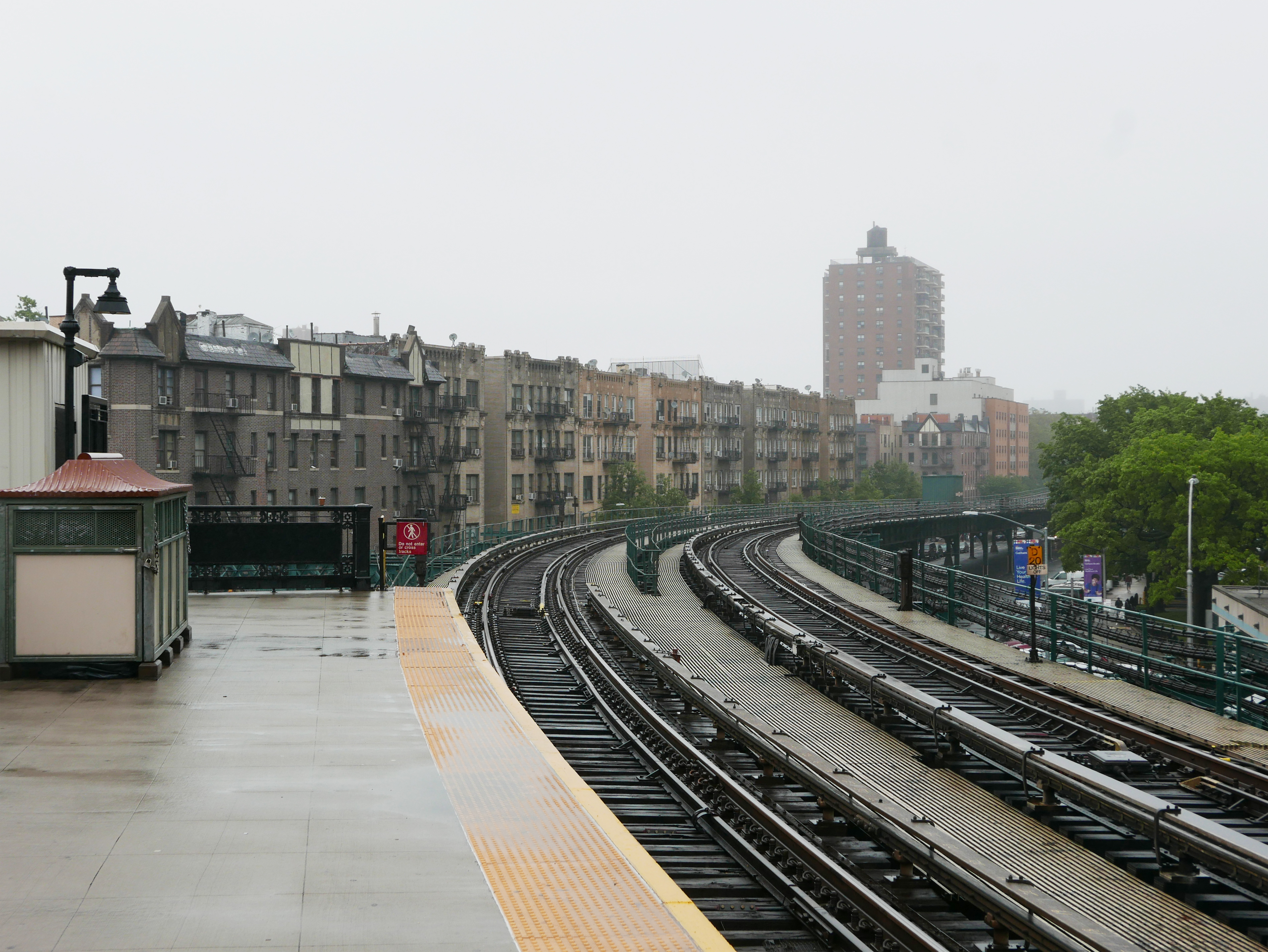
Elevation at north end of station

The Dyckman Street station has two side platforms and two tracks. The station is served by the 1 at all times and is between 207th Street to the north and 191st Street to the south. The station is built into the base of a steep hill known as Fort George. The southern end of the station lies at the northern portal of the Washington Heights Mine Tunnel, which takes the IRT Broadway–Seventh Avenue Line through the bedrock of Manhattan. Here, the line maintains a level grade through the tunnel. The portal of the tunnel is an arch made of rusticated granite blocks, atop which is a keystone and a concrete parapet. There is a rectangular pediment with the inscription "Fort George 1776-1906", flanked by scrolls, atop the center of the arch. North of the station, the terrain of Upper Manhattan drops abruptly and the line becomes elevated to Van Cortlandt Park–242nd Street.

The platforms are offset slightly: the southbound platform extends further to the north than the northbound platform. A center express track, which is currently unused in revenue service, forms just north of this station and runs nonstop to just south of 242nd Street. There used to be a spur track south of the station, but that was removed when the platforms were extended.

=== Station design ===
Both platforms have beige windscreens and red canopies with green frames at the center. The red metal roofs contain rafters and are supported by steel truss bars. Along the platform on either side of the canopy, there are waist-high cast-iron railings with lampposts. The southern end of the northbound platform is adjacent to a concrete retaining wall at the portal of the Washington Heights Mine Tunnel, which slopes down toward the north. There is a blue-and-green "DYCKMAN ST" mosaic on this retaining wall. The southern end of the southbound platform contains equipment rooms and is adjacent to Substation 17.

As with other original IRT elevated viaducts, the elevated structure north of Dyckman Street is carried on two column bents, one on each side of the road, at places where the tracks are no more than 29 feet (8.8 m) above the ground level. There is zigzag lateral bracing at intervals of every four panels.

=== Exit ===
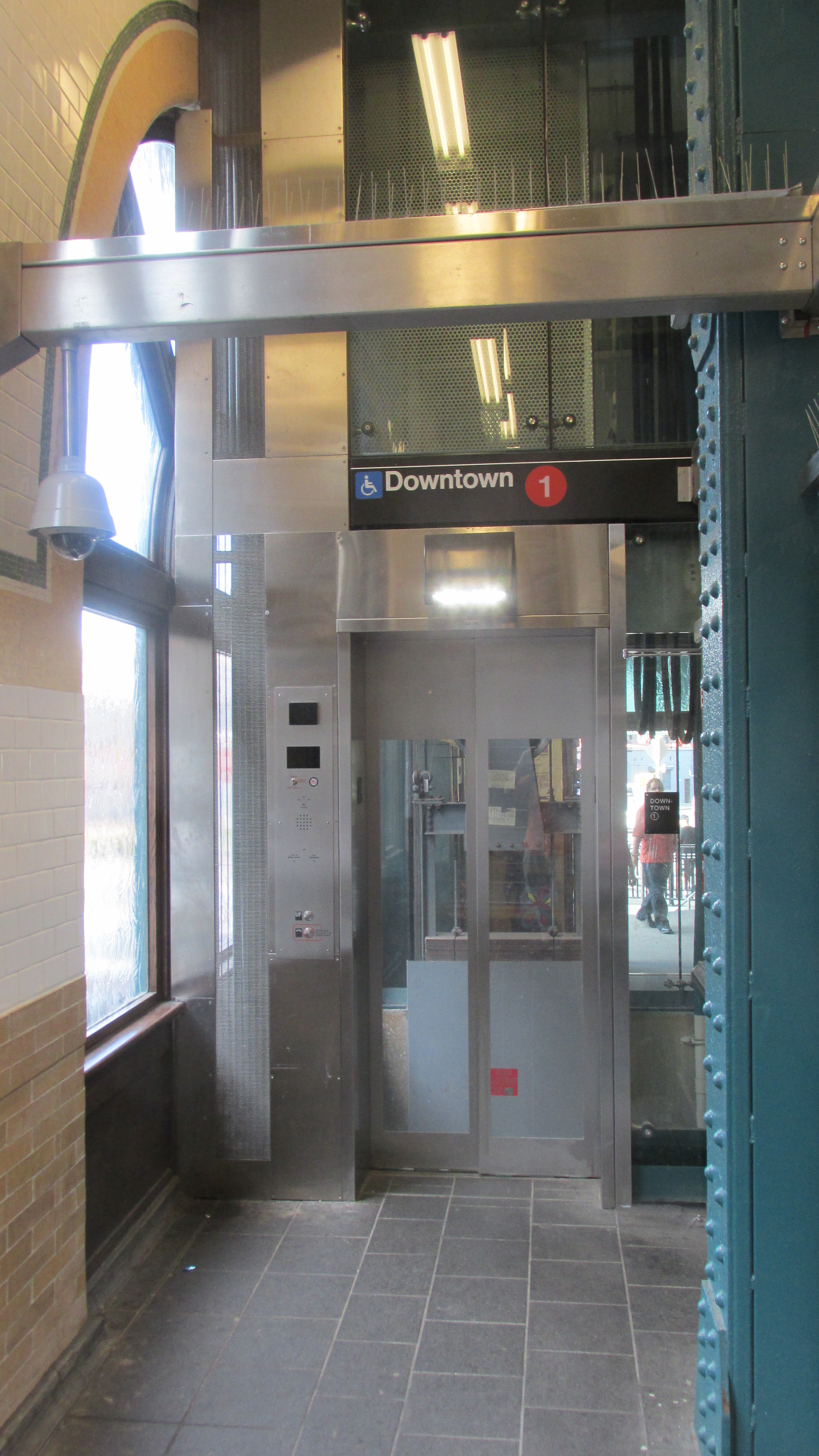
Southbound elevator inside

The station's only entrance is a station house slightly above ground level at the southern corner of Nagle Avenue, Dyckman Street, and Hillside Avenue. Because of the street layout, the northern end of the station house resembles a wedge in plan. The station house is designed in the Beaux-Arts style with concrete facades that are designed to resemble ashlar. There is a ramp and stairs leading up from street level to the station house entrance, which consists of a pair of arches under the elevated viaduct. The northwestern corner of the station house contains a plinth, which supports the northern end of the southbound platform. The western facade of the station house, under the southbound platform, has seven arched windows facing Hillside Avenue.

Inside the station house, the ceiling is supported by large metal I-beams and made of concrete. The eastern side of the ceiling is below the track bed and contains an arched ceiling, which is about 5 feet (1.5 m) lower than the rest of the ceiling. The north, west, and east walls contain a buff-brick wainscoting of Roman brick at the lowest part of the walls. The upper sections of these walls are clad with white glass tiles, topped by a green mosaic band about 12 inches (300 mm) wide. The southern wall contains a 1991 artwork called Flight by Wopo Holup. It features ceramic relief tiles depicting birds in flight. For the 2013 renovation, Holup commissioned an addition to her previous work, with a relief-tile depiction of the moon surrounded by a band of white mosaic tiles.

The space is divided roughly in half by a turnstile bank, with an accompanying station agent's booth on the eastern wall. South of the turnstile bank, within fare control, one staircase from either side of the station house leads to each platform. An elevator also leads to the southbound platform. The elevator is of a "machine room-less" design and is the first of its type to be installed in the New York City Subway system. The southern wall of the station house contains staff rooms. A second elevator ascends to the northbound platform.

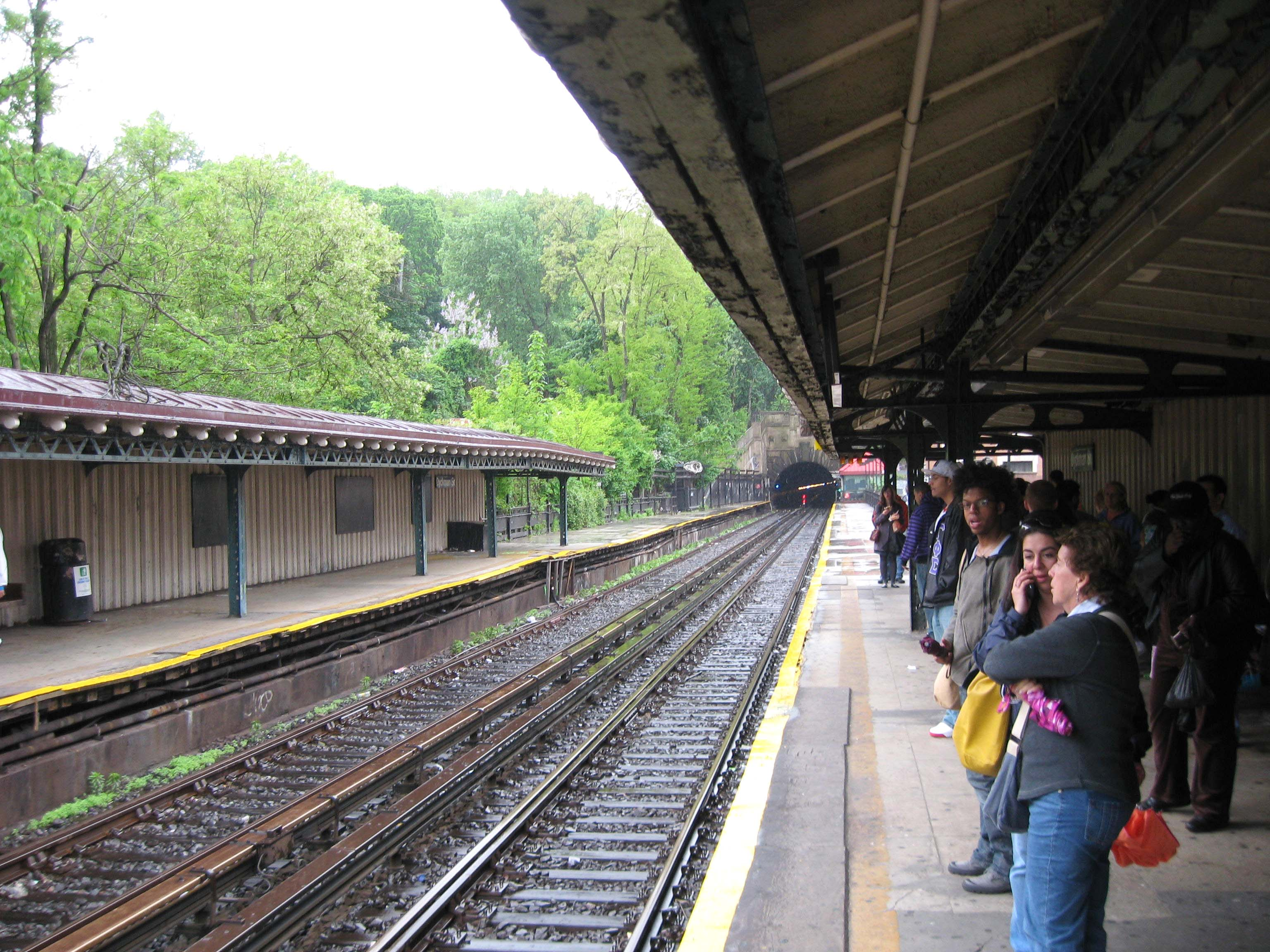
Platforms before renovation

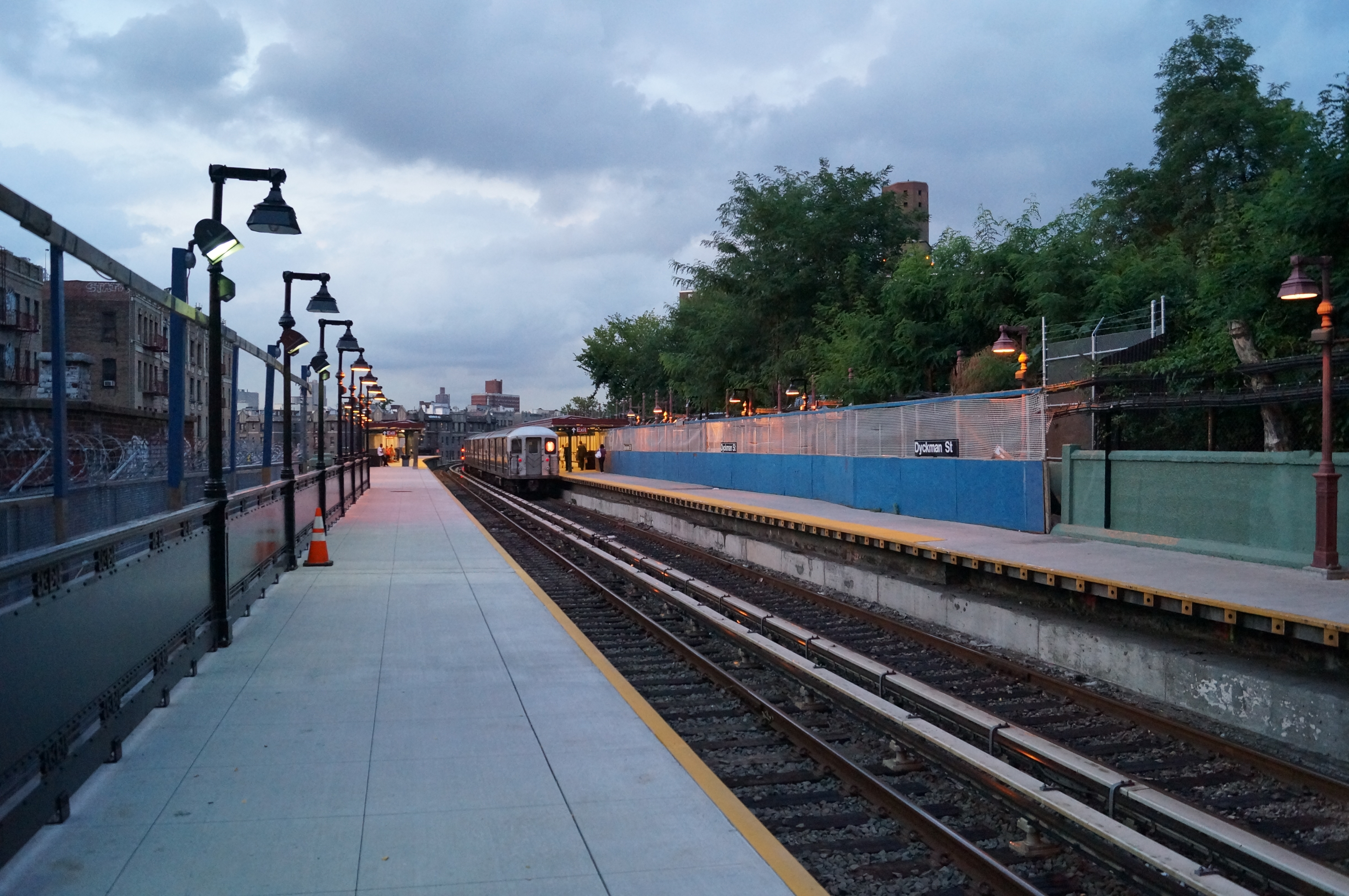
Platforms during renovation

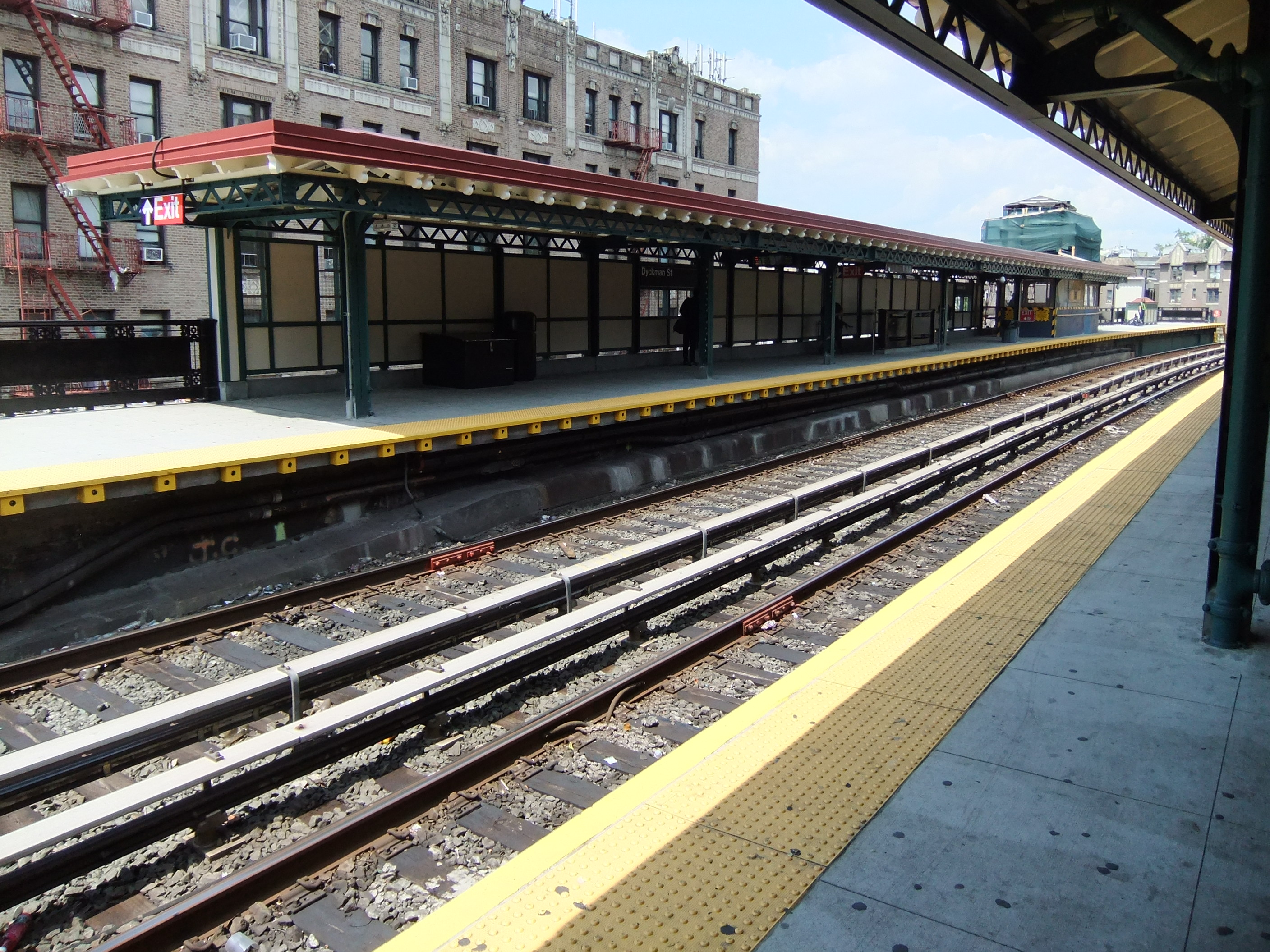
Platforms after renovation

== See also ==
- National Register of Historic Places listings in Manhattan above 110th Street
