= 207th Street =

207th Street may refer to:

- 207th Street Yard, a rail yard of the New York City Subway system
- 207th Street (IND Eighth Avenue Line); the northern terminal of the A train
- 207th Street (IRT Broadway – Seventh Avenue Line); serving the 1 train
- 207th Street (Manhattan), New York City
