= Marble Hill–225th Street station =

New York City Subway station in Manhattan

Marble Hill–225 Street
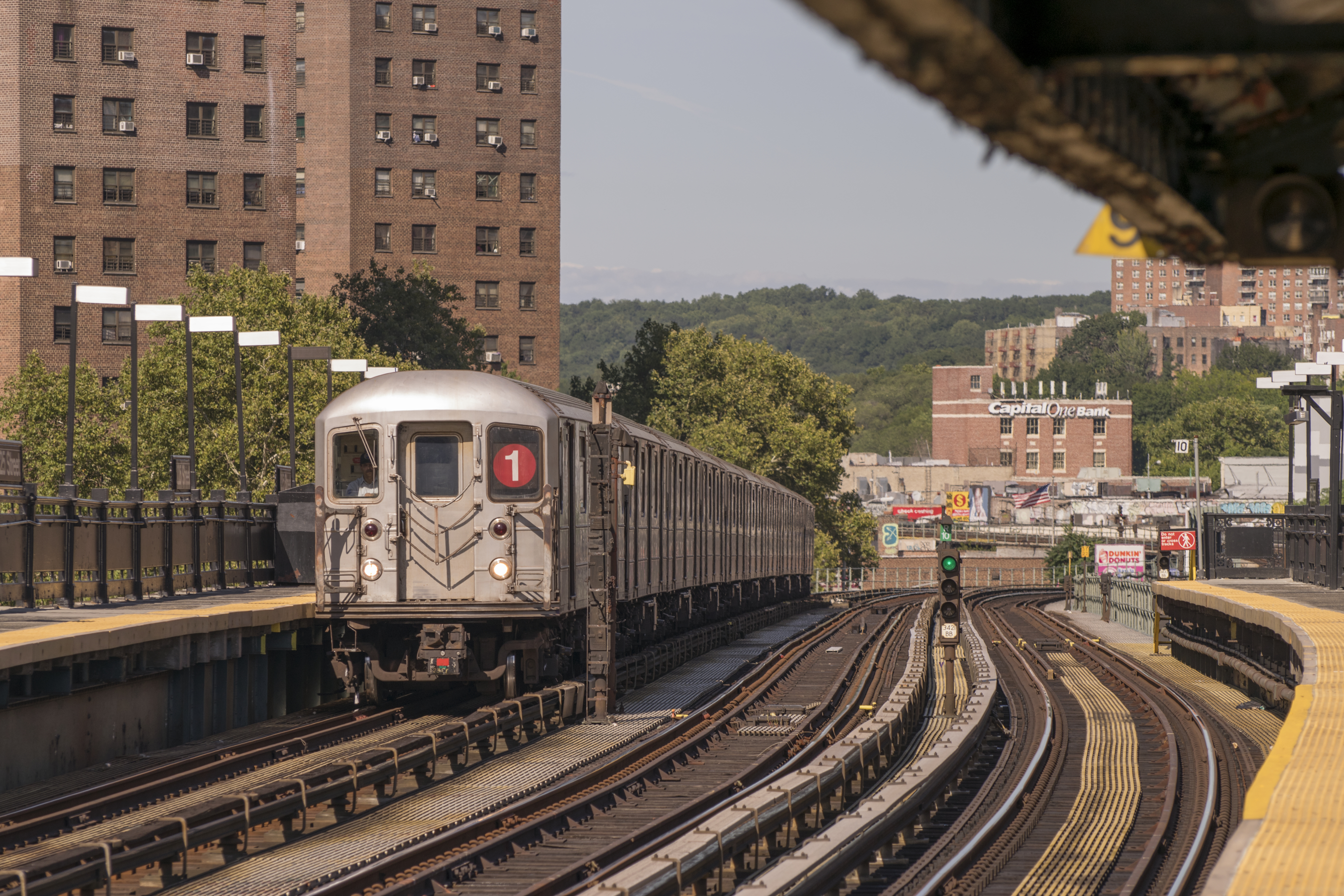
- Downtown 1 train arriving

Station statistics
- Address: West 225th Street & Broadway; New York, New York
- Borough: Manhattan
- Locale: Marble Hill
- Coordinates: 40.874°N 73.91°W
- Division: A (IRT)
- Line: IRT Broadway–Seventh Avenue Line
- Services: 1 (all times)
- Transit: NYCT Bus: Bx7, Bx9, Bx20; Metro-North: Hudson Line (at Marble Hill)
- Structure: Elevated
- Platforms: 2 side platforms
- Tracks: 3 (2 in regular service)

Other information
- Opened: January 14, 1907; 119 years ago

Traffic
- 2025: 1,071,345 ▲5.9%
- Rank: 297 out of 423
Services
Preceding station	New York City Subway	Following station
231st Street toward Van Cortlandt Park–242nd Street	Local	215th Street toward South Ferry
Location
Location within New York City Subway
Location within New York City
Location within New York
Track layout
Street map
Station service legend
Symbol	Description
Stops all times	Stops all times

The Marble Hill–225th Street station (signed as 225th Street) is a local station on the IRT Broadway–Seventh Avenue Line of the New York City Subway. Located at the intersection of Broadway and 225th Street in the Marble Hill neighborhood of Manhattan, it is served by the 1 train at all times.

== History ==
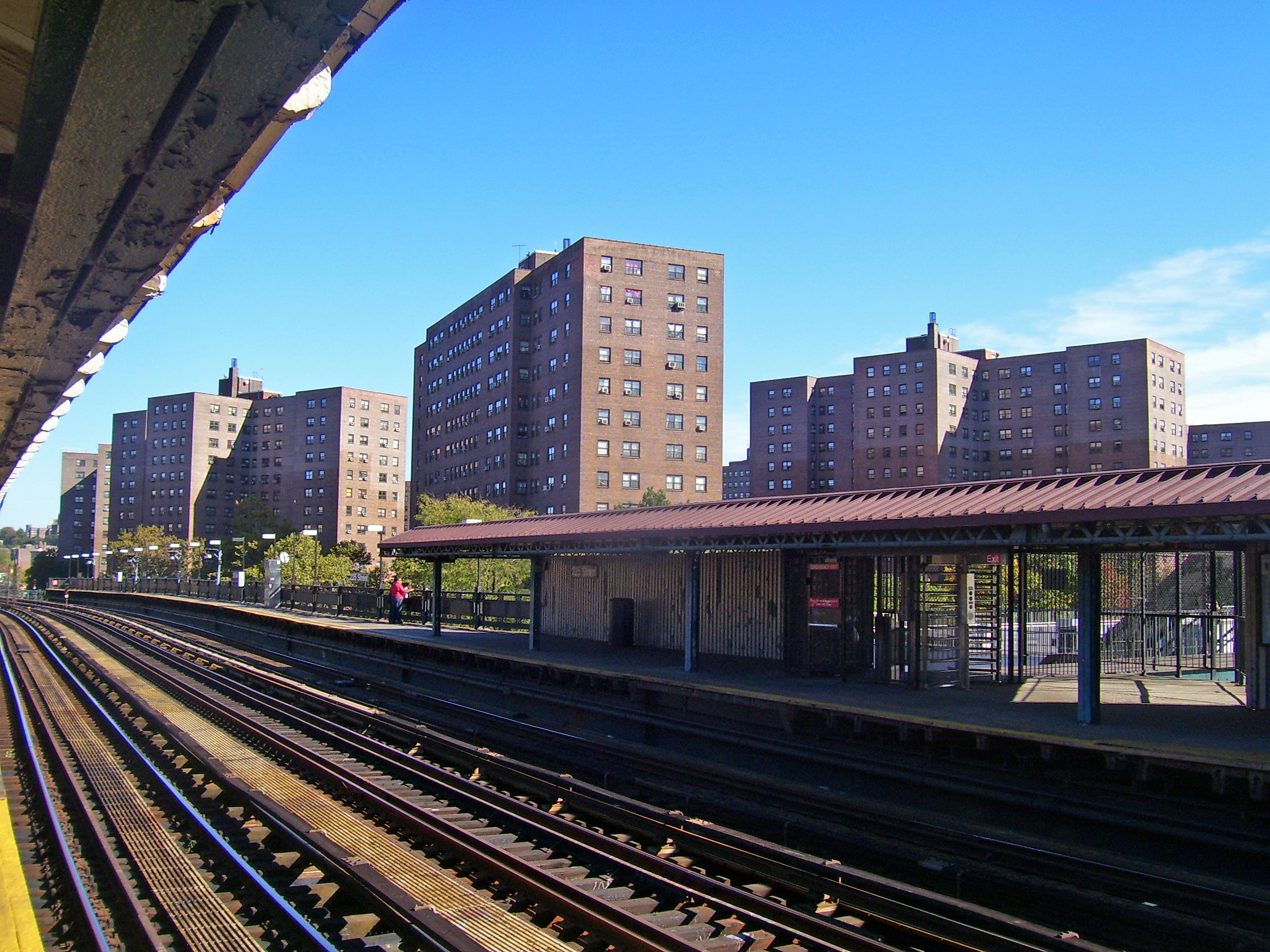
Northbound view from southbound platform

The West Side Branch of the original subway line was extended to 225th Street on January 14, 1907. It would briefly serve as the terminus for the line, until the structure of the 221st Street station was dismantled and moved to 230th Street, where a new temporary terminus was opened on January 27, 1907.

To address overcrowding, in 1909, the New York Public Service Commission proposed lengthening the platforms at stations along the original IRT subway. As part of a modification to the IRT's construction contracts made on January 18, 1910, the company was to lengthen station platforms to accommodate ten-car express and six-car local trains. In addition to $1.5 million (equivalent to $51.8 million in 2025) spent on platform lengthening, $500,000 (equivalent to $17.3 million in 2025) was spent on building additional entrances and exits. It was anticipated that these improvements would increase capacity by 25 percent. The northbound platform at the 225th Street station was extended 95 feet (29 m) to the north. The southbound platform was not lengthened. Six-car local trains began operating in October 1910, and ten-car express trains began running on the West Side Line on January 24, 1911. Subsequently, the station could accommodate six-car local trains, but ten-car trains could not open some of their doors.

In Fiscal Year 1924, an additional stairway was constructed to the northbound platform to accommodate additional ridership from the New York Velodrome.

The city government took over the IRT's operations on June 12, 1940. Platforms at IRT Broadway–Seventh Avenue Line stations between 103rd Street and 238th Street, including those at 225th Street, were lengthened to 514 feet (157 m) between 1946 and 1948, allowing full ten-car express trains to stop at these stations. A contract for the platform extensions at 225th Street and five other stations on the line was awarded to the Rao Electrical Equipment Company and the Kaplan Electric Company in June 1946. The platform extensions at these stations were opened in stages. On July 9, 1948, the platform extensions at stations between 207th Street and 238th Street, including the 225th Street station, were opened for use at the cost of $423,000. At the same time, the IRT routes were given numbered designations with the introduction of "R-type" rolling stock, which contained rollsigns with numbered designations for each service. The route to 242nd Street became known as the 1.

From August 21, 1989 to May 27, 2005 this was one of three (originally four) stations served by only the 9 train during rush hours (as well as middays before September 4, 1994), when skip stop service was operating. 1 trains served the station at all other times when the 9 was not operating. Skip-stop service as well as the 9 train were discontinued on May 29, 2005, at which point the 1 train began stopping at the station at all times.

== Station layout ==
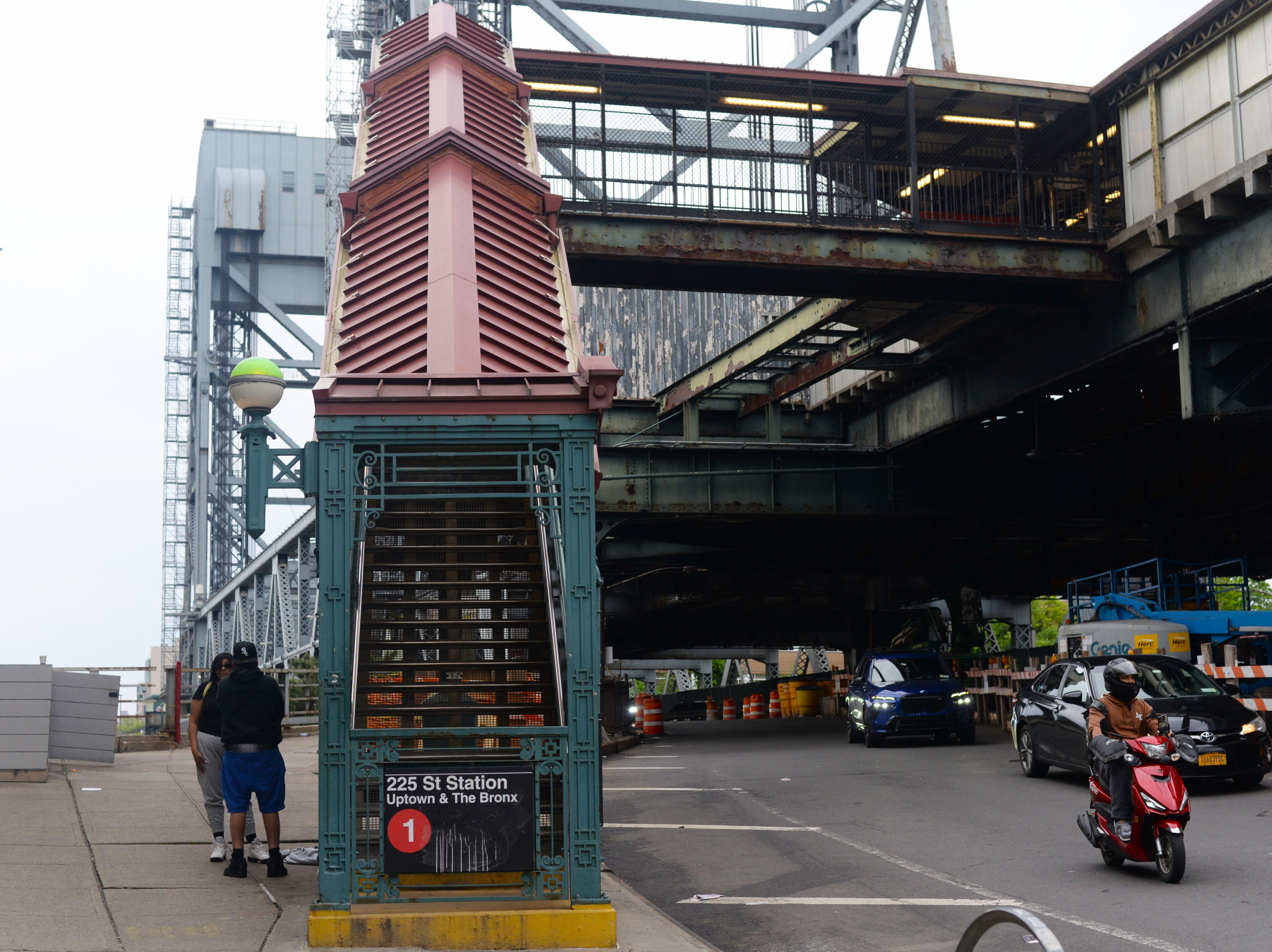
Eastern street staircase

This elevated station has three tracks and two side platforms. The center track is not used in revenue service. The station is served by the 1 at all times and is between 231st Street to the north and 215th Street to the south. The southern half of the platforms has beige windscreens and red canopies with green frames and support columns while the northern half has black, steel, waist high fences and lampposts. The station signs are in the standard black name plates in white lettering.

The 1991 artwork here, by Wopo Holup, is called Elevated Nature I-IV. Portions are also located at four other stations on this line.

Marble Hill–225th Street is the northernmost subway station in Manhattan, and is one of two subway stations in Manhattan that are not located on Manhattan Island itself, the other one being Roosevelt Island on the F and M trains.

=== Exits ===
All fare control areas are at platform level and there are no crossovers or crossunders. Both platforms have a station house, but only the southbound one is active. It has a turnstile bank, token booth, and one staircase going down to 225th Street and the northwest corner of Broadway. Access to and from the northbound platform is via two full-height turnstiles, one exit-only and the other entry-exit, and one staircase going down to the east side of Broadway across from the northwest corner of 225th Street.

== Location ==
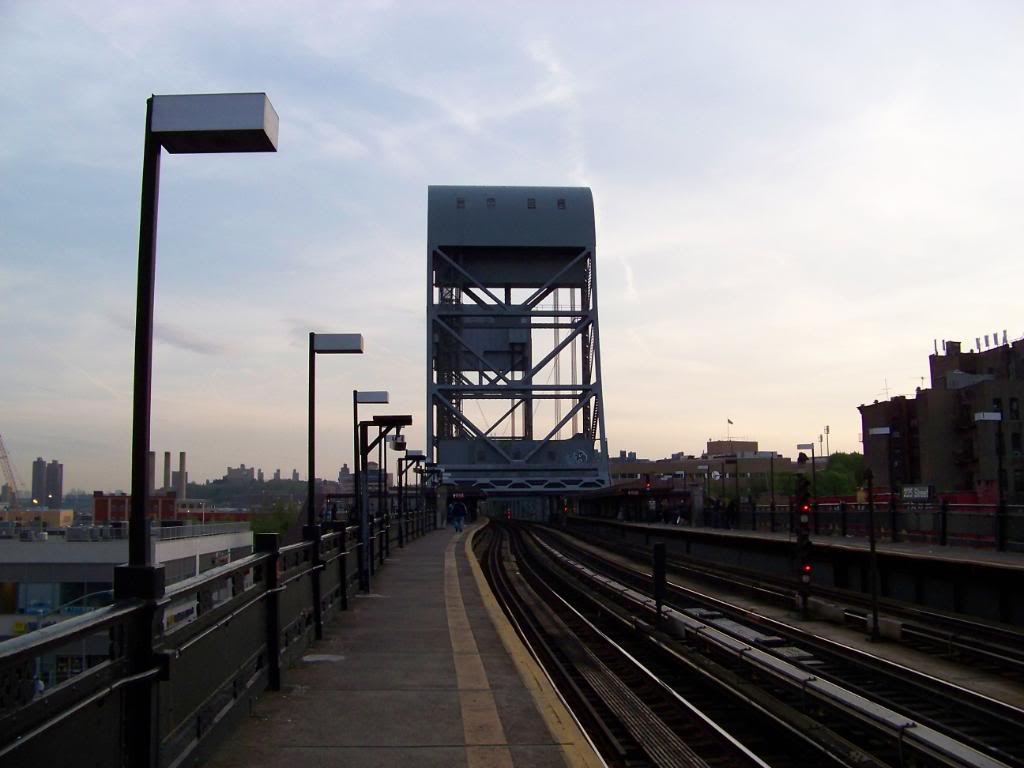
View south toward bridge

This station is less than 0.2 miles (0.32 km) from the Marble Hill station on Metro-North Railroad's Hudson Line. Just south of the station, the IRT Broadway–Seventh Avenue Line crosses the Broadway Bridge onto the island of Manhattan.

This station today and the neighborhood it serves reside on the north shore of the Harlem River Ship Canal, also known as Spuyten Duyvil Creek, and are thus geographically on the mainland. However, the neighborhood was formerly part of the island of Manhattan. The canal was constructed in 1895, separating the neighborhood from the rest of the island. After the original creek bed was filled in, Marble Hill became part of the mainland, although it is still considered part of Manhattan for administrative and political purposes. (Note: See Manhattan for an explanation of the distinction between island of Manhattan and the borough of Manhattan, a political entity consisting of the island of Manhattan, several other islands, and the Marble Hill neighborhood on the mainland.)
