= 181st Street station (IRT Broadway–Seventh Avenue Line) =

New York City Subway station in Manhattan

181 Street
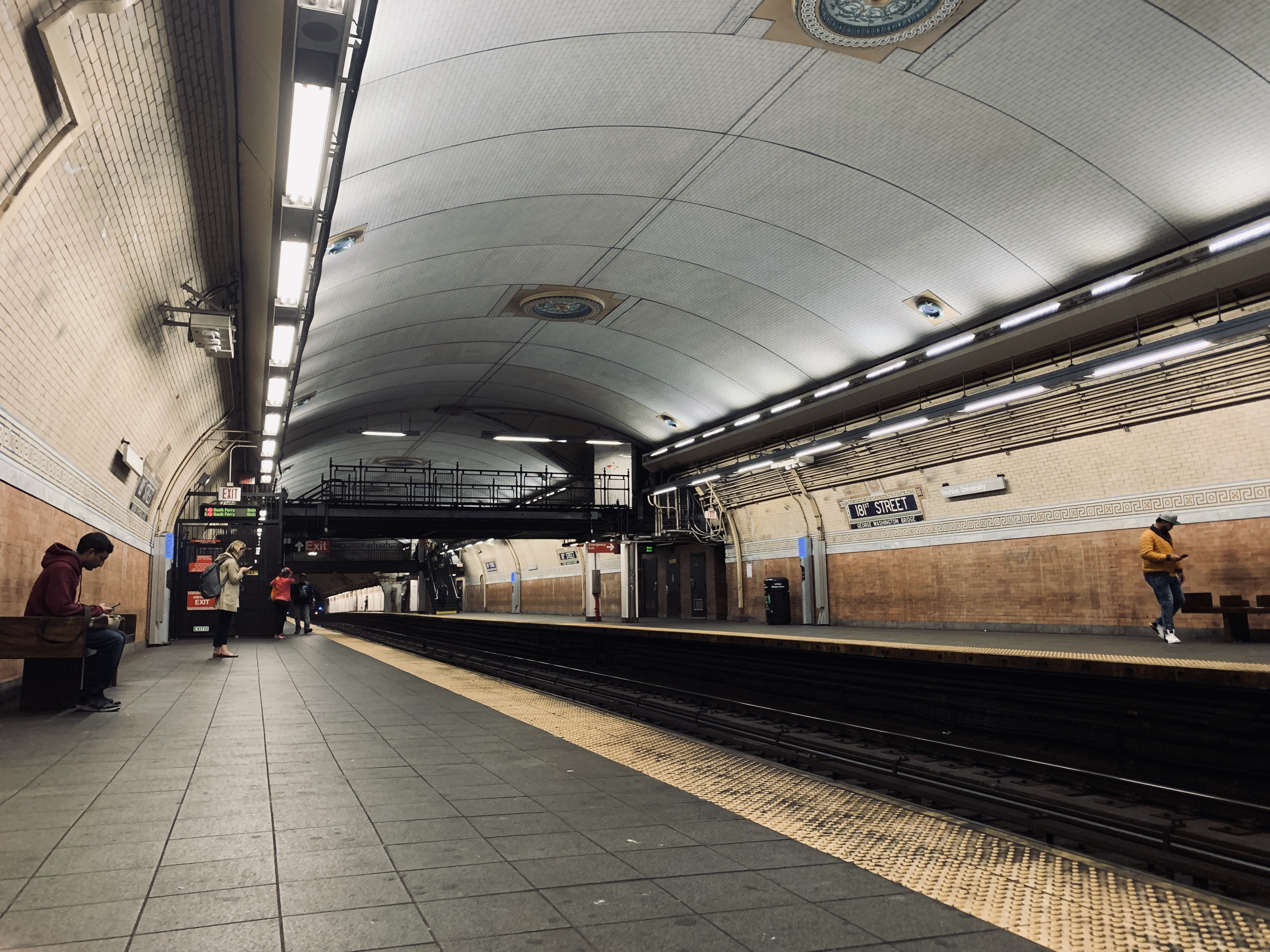
- Renovated platform view

Station statistics
- Address: West 181st Street & Saint Nicholas Avenue; New York, New York
- Borough: Manhattan
- Locale: Washington Heights
- Coordinates: 40.849°N 73.934°W
- Division: A (IRT)
- Line: IRT Broadway–Seventh Avenue Line
- Services: 1 (all times)
- Transit: NYCT Bus: M3, Bx3, Bx11, Bx13, Bx35, Bx36; GWB Bus Station (at 179th Street)
- Structure: Underground
- Depth: 120 feet (37 m)
- Platforms: 2 side platforms
- Tracks: 2

Other information
- Opened: May 30, 1906; 120 years ago
- Accessible: Partially; access to mezzanine only, platforms not accessible
- Former/other names: 181st Street–George Washington Bridge

Traffic
- 2025: 2,466,470 ▲9.3%
- Rank: 150 out of 423
Services
Preceding station	New York City Subway	Following station
191st Street toward Van Cortlandt Park–242nd Street	1 (New York City Subway service)	168th Street toward South Ferry
Location
Location within New York City Subway
Location within New York City
Location within New York
Track layout
Street map
Station service legend
Symbol	Description
Stops all times	Stops all times
- 181st Street Subway Station (IRT)
- U.S. National Register of Historic Places
- U.S. Historic district – Contributing property
- New York State Register of Historic Places
- Part of: Dominican Historic District (ID100011048)
- MPS: New York City Subway System MPS
- NRHP reference No.: 05000224
- NYSRHP No.: 06101.015033

Significant dates
- Added to NRHP: March 30, 2005
- Designated CP: January 24, 2025
- Designated NYSRHP: December 18, 2004

The 181st Street station (signed as 181st Street–George Washington Bridge) is a station on the IRT Broadway–Seventh Avenue Line of the New York City Subway. Located at the intersection of St. Nicholas Avenue and 181st Street in the Washington Heights neighborhood of Manhattan, it is served by the 1 train at all times.

Built by the Interborough Rapid Transit Company (IRT), the station opened on May 30, 1906, as part of the first subway, although the line had opened two months earlier and trains were skipping the station. It is one of three stations in the Fort George Mine Tunnel, which carries the Broadway–Seventh Avenue Line under Washington Heights, and is 120 feet (37 m) below ground level. Due to the station's depth, the tunnel was blasted through the hillside; during the station's construction, a 300-ton boulder had killed 10 miners. The station's platforms were lengthened in 1948. The station was closed from December 2020 to November 2021 for elevator replacement.

The 181st Street station contains two side platforms and two tracks. The station was built with tile and mosaic decorations as well as a ceiling vault. The platforms contain exits to 181st Street and St. Nicholas Avenue. 181st Street is one of three New York City Subway stations that can be accessed only by elevators; however, the station's four elevators are not compliant with the Americans with Disabilities Act of 1990 (ADA). The station is listed on the National Register of Historic Places.

== History ==
=== Construction and opening ===
==== Construction ====
Planning for a subway line in New York City dates to 1864, but development of what became the city's first subway line did not start until 1894, when the New York State Legislature passed the Rapid Transit Act. The subway plans were drawn up by a team of engineers led by William Barclay Parsons, the Rapid Transit Commission's chief engineer. It called for a subway line from New York City Hall in lower Manhattan to the Upper West Side, where two branches would lead north into the Bronx. A plan was formally adopted in 1897, and all legal conflicts over the route alignment were resolved near the end of 1899.

The Rapid Transit Construction Company, organized by John B. McDonald and funded by August Belmont Jr., signed the initial Contract 1 with the Rapid Transit Commission in February 1900, under which it would construct the subway and maintain a 50-year operating lease from the opening of the line. In 1901, the firm of Heins & LaFarge was hired to design the underground stations. Belmont incorporated the Interborough Rapid Transit Company (IRT) in April 1902 to operate the subway.

The 181st Street station was constructed as part of the IRT's West Side Line (now the Broadway–Seventh Avenue Line) from 133rd Street to a point 100 feet (30 m) north of 182nd Street. Work on this section was conducted by L. B. McCabe & Brother, who started building the tunnel segment on May 14, 1900. On that date, a groundbreaking ceremony took place at Broadway and 156th Street, one block south of the 157th Street station site. The 168th Street, 181st Street, and 191st Street stations were built as part of the Washington Heights Mine Tunnel (also known as the Fort George Tunnel), which stretches for over 2 miles (3.2 km). The tunnel was dug through the hard rock under Washington Heights, with work proceeding from either end as well as from construction shafts. Construction shafts were excavated at 168th and 181st Streets, and elevators were installed inside these construction shafts after the tunnel was completed. The tunnel was mined in the early morning to minimize disruption. Much of the rock was crushed for concrete, including the concrete floor. The rails and arched roof were laid using travelers that proceeded the length of the tunnel. During construction, on October 24, 1903, a 300-ton boulder weakened by an explosive gave way, killing 10 miners (six instantly) and injuring eight more. The dead miners consisted of nine Italian immigrants (including the foreman) as well as an electrician from Germany.

==== Opening ====
The original New York City Subway line from City Hall to 145th Street on the West Side Branch opened in 1904, with the line being extended to 157th Street that year. The West Side Branch was extended northward from 157th Street to a temporary terminus at 221st Street, near the Harlem River Ship Canal, (Note: One New York Times article labeled the Harlem River Ship Canal station as being at 220th Street. However, others have referred to that station as being on 221st Street.) on March 12, 1906, with the station at 181st Street not yet open. The 181st Street station opened on May 30, 1906, when express trains began running through to 221st Street. On the following day, new feeder streetcar lines operated by the Interborough Railway Company began running from the Bronx, over the Washington Bridge, and along 181st Street, to the station to provide transfers with the subway at the new station. These routes ran along Aqueduct Avenue, Fordham Road, 189th Street, Southern Boulevard, and 180th Street in the Bronx, connecting the West Bronx with the new subway line.

The opening of the first subway line, and particularly the 181st Street station, in conjunction with the streetcar routes over the Washington Bridge, helped contribute to a development boom in the direct vicinity of the station and the development of Washington Heights. Within five years, five- and six-story apartment buildings occupied most of the area around the station. The opening of the subway transformed the sparsely populated area into a growing neighborhood with apartment buildings and thriving business district along 181st Street.

After the first subway line was completed in 1908, the station was served by West Side local and express trains. Express trains began at South Ferry in Manhattan or Atlantic Avenue in Brooklyn, and ended at 242nd Street in the Bronx. Local trains ran from City Hall to 242nd Street during rush hours, continuing south from City Hall to South Ferry at other times.

Due to the draftiness of the 181st Street and 168th Street stations, many women's petticoats would fly about. In February 1908, engineers at the New York Public Service Commission (PSC) were almost done devising a solution to the problem.

=== Service changes and station renovations ===
==== 1910s to 1930s ====
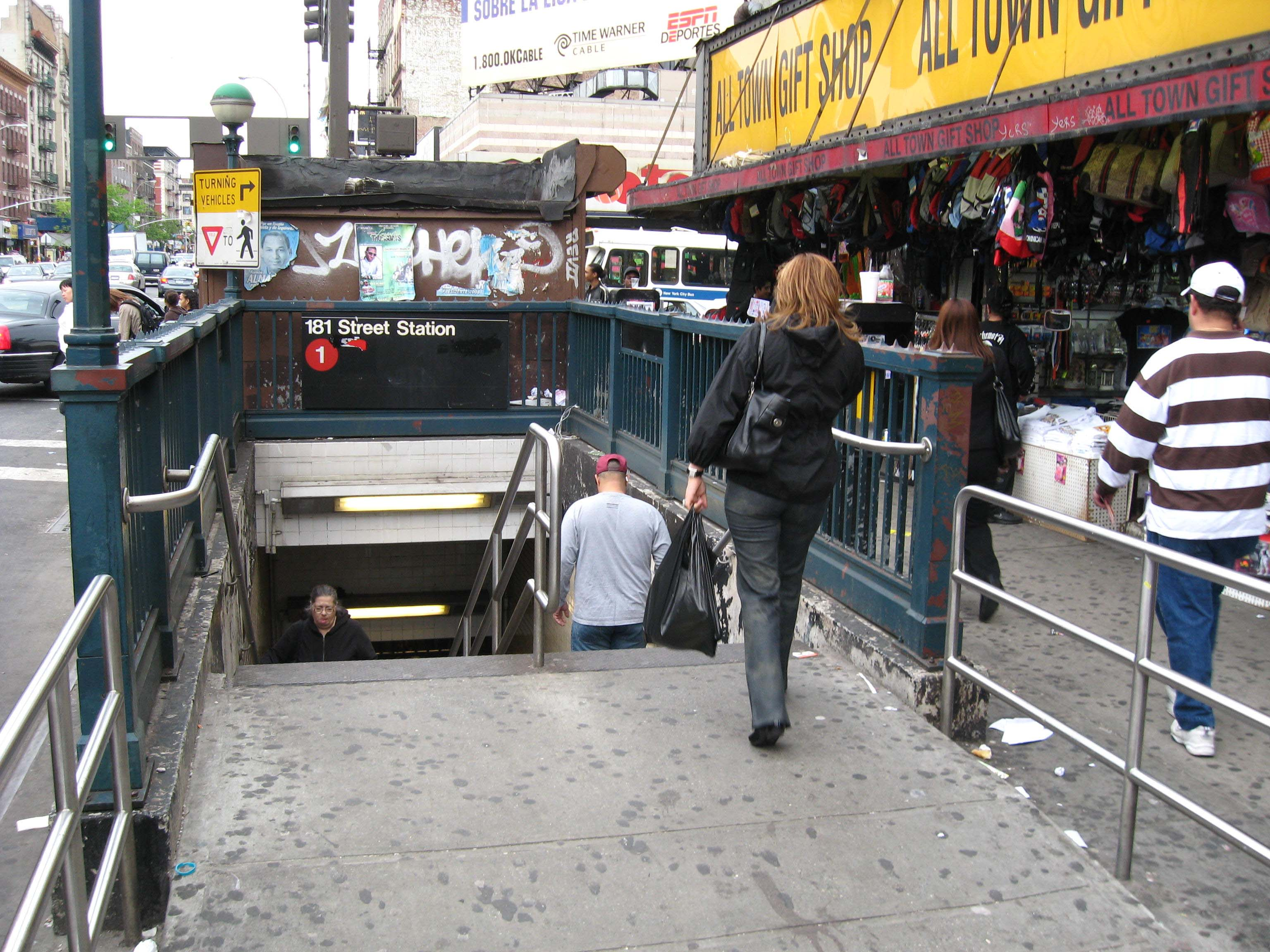
Street stair

The station was originally built with two elevators on the southern end of the uptown platform. In fiscal year 1909, work was done to increase the carrying load of the elevators. On June 25, 1909, the New York City Board of Estimate approved an appropriation of $160,000 (equivalent to $5,733,333 in 2025) for the installation of four additional elevators on the northern end of the uptown platform. These elevators measured 8.75 by 11.5 feet (2.67 by 3.51 m) each and could carry up to 8,000 pounds (3,628.7 kg). In June 1910, work on the additional elevators was about 50 percent complete and was on track to be completed by March 1, 1911, although some of the elevators were to be placed in service before then. Work to install the elevators was nearly complete in 1911, and the final finishes were installed by January and February 1912. On February 3, 1913, the PSC was informed that the IRT had let a contract to construct an additional elevator at the station, which would be completed in April. The elevator would supplement the four elevators already in service at the station and would make use of the space provided in the elevator shaft for two additional elevators. The PSC had ordered that the IRT install two additional elevators in the station a few months prior. On May 19, 1915, residents of Washington Heights requested that the PSC install additional elevators at the 181st Street and 168th Street stations.

To address overcrowding, in 1909, the PSC proposed lengthening the platforms at stations along the original IRT subway. As part of a modification to the IRT's construction contracts made on January 18, 1910, the company was to lengthen station platforms to accommodate ten-car express and six-car local trains. In addition to $1.5 million (equivalent to $51.8 million in 2025) spent on platform lengthening, $500,000 (equivalent to $17.3 million in 2025) was spent on building additional entrances and exits. It was anticipated that these improvements would increase capacity by 25 percent. The northbound platform at the 181st Street station was extended 176 feet (54 m) to the north; timbering was used to support the arched ceiling during the extension work, thereby allowing it to retain structural integrity. The southbound platform was not lengthened. Six-car local trains began operating in October 1910, and ten-car express trains began running on the West Side Line on January 24, 1911. Subsequently, the station could accommodate six-car local trains, but ten-car trains could not open some of their doors.

In 1918, the Broadway–Seventh Avenue Line opened south of Times Square–42nd Street, and the original line was divided into an H-shaped system. The original West Side Line thus became part of the Broadway–Seventh Avenue Line. Local trains were sent to South Ferry, while express trains used the new Clark Street Tunnel to Brooklyn.

On March 10, 1925, members of a committee of the Cheskchamay Democratic Club of the 23rd Assembly District requested that the New York City Board of Transportation (NYCBOT) construct additional elevators at 180th Street and 182nd Street on the west side of St. Nicholas Avenue to reduce congestion at the station's six elevators. Transit Commissioner John O'Ryan said he would look into the issue and said that having the four north elevators run to the northbound platform instead of running only to the mezzanine level as a short-term measure could help address some of the congestion.

==== 1940s to 1990s ====
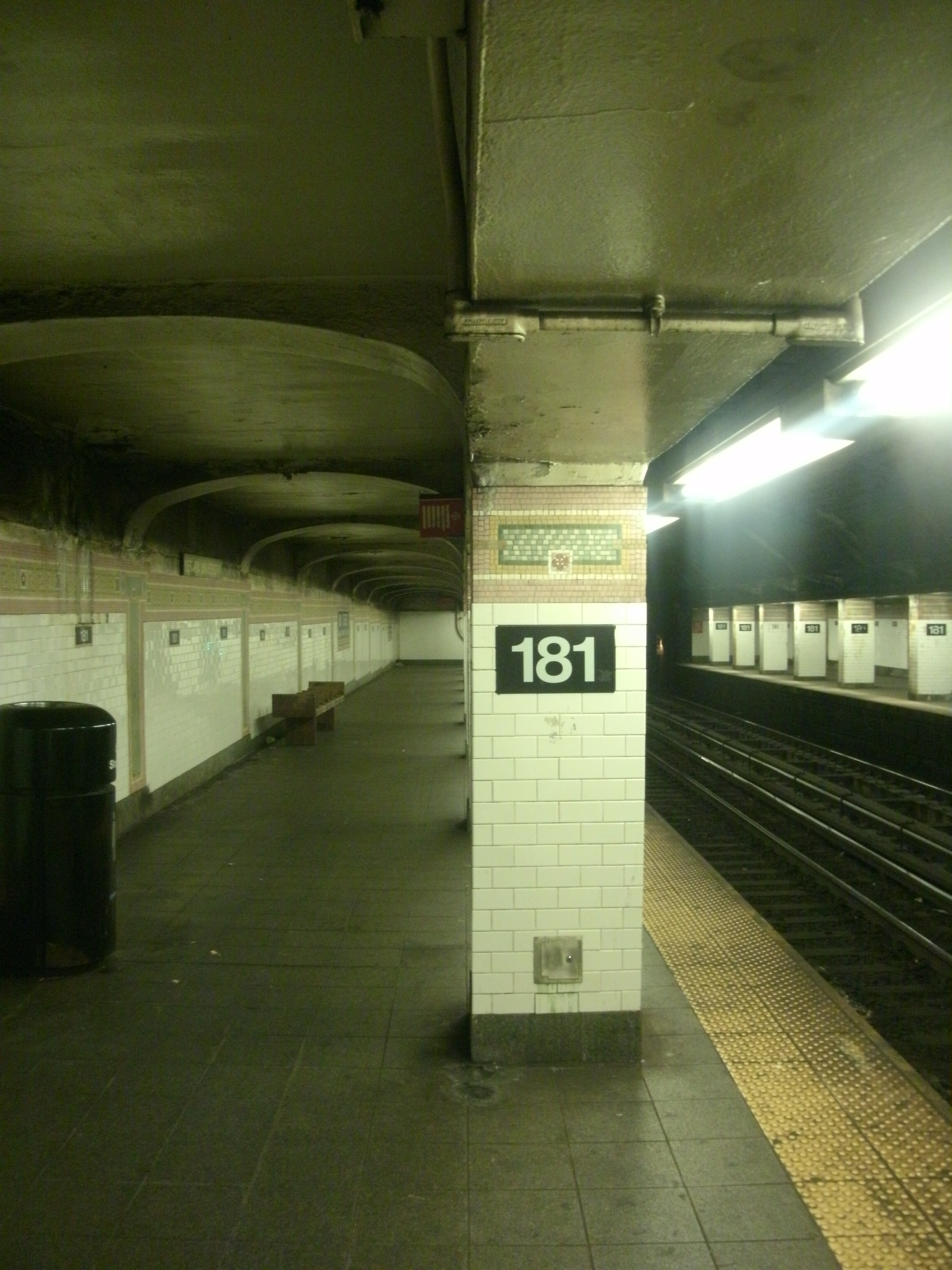
A view of the platform extensions

The city government took over the IRT's operations on June 12, 1940. Platforms at IRT Broadway–Seventh Avenue Line stations between 103rd Street and 238th Street, including those at 181st Street, were lengthened to 514 feet (157 m) between 1946 and 1948, allowing full ten-car express trains to stop at these stations. A contract for the platform extensions at 181st Street and eight other stations on the line was awarded to Spencer, White & Prentis Inc. in October 1946, with an estimated cost of $3.891 million (equivalent to $64,241,340 in 2025). The platform extensions at these stations were opened in stages. On April 6, 1948, the platform extension at 181st Street opened. Simultaneously, the IRT routes were given numbered designations with the introduction of "R-type" rolling stock, which contained rollsigns with numbered designations for each service. The route to 242nd Street became known as the 1. In 1959, all 1 trains became local.

On December 28, 1950, the NYCBOT issued a report concerning the construction of bomb shelters in the subway system. Five deep stations in Washington Heights, including the 181st Street station, were considered to be ideal for being used as bomb-proof shelters. The program was expected to cost $104 million (equivalent to $1.392 billion in 2025). These shelters were expected to provide limited protection against conventional bombs while protecting against shock waves and air blast, as well as from the heat and radiation from an atomic bomb. To become suitable as shelters, the stations would require water-supply facilities, first-aid rooms, and additional bathrooms. However, the program, which required federal funding, was never completed.

On July 28, 1959, the New York City Transit Authority (NYCTA) released an invitation to contractors to bid on a project to remove an entrance kiosk at street level and replace it with an underpass under 181st Street to the street's northern building line. Work on the project was to be completed within eight months of the letting of the contract. The old entrance kiosk was demolished with a ceremony in April 1960. City officials claimed it was the highest subway kiosk in Manhattan, at 188 feet (57 m) above sea level. Additionally, in Fiscal Year 1959, two elevators in the station were replaced with automatic ones that could travel at higher speeds. In Fiscal Year 1961, the installation of fluorescent lighting at the station was completed. In 1963, one of the elevators at the station was replaced, while work replacing two more was underway. In June 1964, it was expected that the replacement of another elevator would be completed in September.

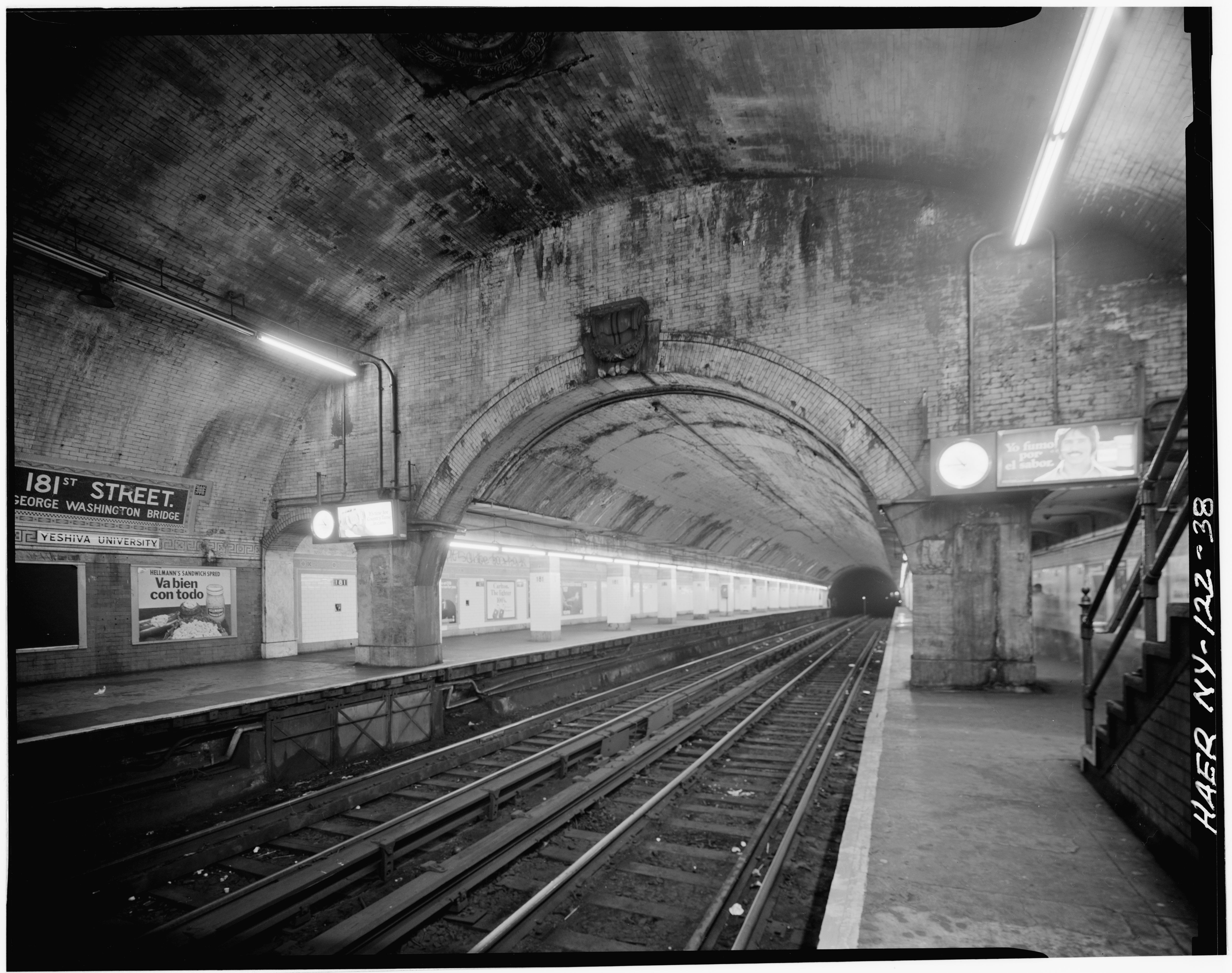
The northern end of the station in 1978

The mezzanine to the southern elevators was closed in 1981. The station was closed for the installation of new elevators in the late 1990s and reopened on November 22, 1999, upon the completion of the installation. (Note: According to Patch and the MTA, in 2020 the elevators were more than eighty years old. However, directly contradicts a 1999 bulletin in the Daily News that announced the installation of new elevators.) The entrance at the southeast corner of 181st Street and St. Nicholas Avenue was to remain closed until early 2000.

In April 1988, the NYCTA unveiled plans to speed up service on the Broadway–Seventh Avenue Line through the implementation of a skip-stop service: the 9 train. When skip-stop service started in 1989, it was only implemented north of 137th Street–City College on weekdays, and 181st Street was served by both the 1 and the 9. Skip-stop service ended on May 27, 2005, as a result of a decrease in the number of riders who benefited.

==== 21st century ====
Several of the elevators in the station are staffed by elevator attendants, who are also employed at four other deep-level stations in Washington Heights. The elevator attendants are intended to reassure passengers, as the elevators are the only entrance to the platforms, and passengers often wait for the elevators with an attendant. The attendants at the five stations are primarily maintenance and cleaning workers who suffered injuries that made it hard for them to continue doing their original jobs. In July 2003, to reduce costs, the Metropolitan Transportation Authority (MTA) announced that as part of its 2004 budget it would eliminate 22 elevator operator positions at the 181st Street station and four others in Washington Heights, leaving one full-time operator per station. The agency had intended to remove all the attendants at these stops, but kept one in each station after many riders protested. In addition, the MTA began operating all elevators at all times; prior to the change, each elevator only operated if it was staffed by an elevator operator. The change took effect on January 20, 2004, and was expected to save $1.15 million (equivalent to $2,012,708 in 2025) a year.

In November 2007, the MTA proposed savings cuts to help reduce the agency's deficit. As part of the plan, all elevator operators at 181st Street, along with those in four other stations in Washington Heights, would have been cut. MTA employees had joined riders in worrying about an increase in crime as a result of the cuts after an elevator operator at 181st Street on the Broadway–Seventh Avenue Line helped save a stabbed passenger. The move was intended to save $1.7 million a year. However, on December 7, 2007, the MTA announced that it would not remove the remaining elevator operators at these stations, due to pushback from elected officials and residents from the area. In October 2018, the MTA once again proposed removing the elevator operators at the five stations, but this was reversed after dissent from the Transport Workers' Union. The MTA again suggested reassigning elevator operators to station-cleaner positions in June 2023, prompting local politicians to sue to prevent the operators' reassignments.

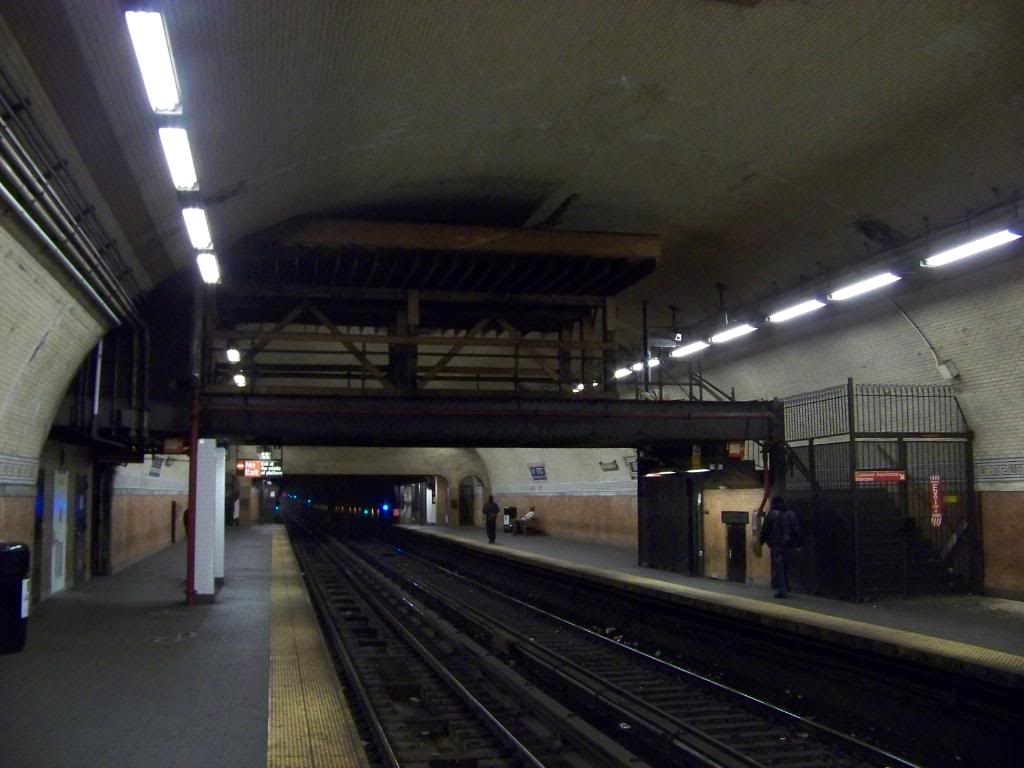
Station view before the 2009 ceiling collapse. Note the scaffolding on the bridge from the 2007 ceiling collapse

The station was added to the National Register of Historic Places in 2005. There was a partial ceiling collapse at the station in 2007. After that collapse, protective scaffolding was erected, and officials devised a master plan for ceiling repairs. However, funds for the ceiling repairs were not approved by the New York State Legislature until August 14, 2009. Two days later, on August 16 at around 10:30 pm, a 25-foot section of the bricks collapsed onto both tracks and platforms. Nobody was injured in the incident. This caused suspension of 1 service between 168th Street and Dyckman Street stations in both directions for eight days with free shuttle buses providing replacement. End-to-end service on the 1 was restored on August 24, and the 181st Street station reopened one week later. An internal MTA audit found that the ceiling had been allowed to decay for a decade prior to the collapse. A $30 million (equivalent to $42,936,391 in 2025) repair of the 168th and 181st Street stations was to start in early 2012, but was delayed by several months due to scheduling conflicts. The renovation, which started in late 2012, was scheduled to take two and a half years. The project received the 2018 Design Award of Excellence from the Society of American Registered Architects' New York chapter.

This station was closed from December 5, 2020, to November 30, 2021, for elevator repair; this was accelerated from an original date range of March 2021 to February 2022. As part of the reconstruction, the elevators were extended to directly serve the northbound platform. During construction, the frequency of M3 bus service between 191st Street and 168th Street was increased. According to a study conducted by New York University researchers and published in 2024, the 181st Street station had some of the highest particulate matter pollution levels of any subway station in New York City.

== Station layout ==
The 181st Street station, which has two tracks and two side platforms, is served by the 1 train at all times. The station is between 191st Street to the north and 168th Street to the south. The station is 120 feet (37 m) below the surface. It is one of three in the deep-level Fort George Mine Tunnel, along with the 168th Street station to the south and the 191st Street station to the north; the tunnel allows the Broadway–Seventh Avenue Line to travel under the high terrain of Washington Heights. The 181st Street station is one of three stations in the New York City Subway system that can be accessed solely by elevators. The other two, also located on the Broadway–Seventh Avenue Line, are 168th Street, as well as Clark Street on the 2 and 3 trains in Brooklyn. However, this station is not ADA-accessible.

Near the northern end of the station, there are four elevators adjacent to the northbound platform, which lead from the fare control level to one level above the platforms and the northbound platform itself. On the second level, a footbridge connects the side platforms. There is a second footbridge near the center of the station. It leads to a shaft next to the northbound platform, which formerly contained two elevators leading to the fare control area. The footbridge and southern elevator bank were closed in 1981; the shaft is used for ventilation and contains a staircase. There was also a third footbridge in the station.

=== Design ===
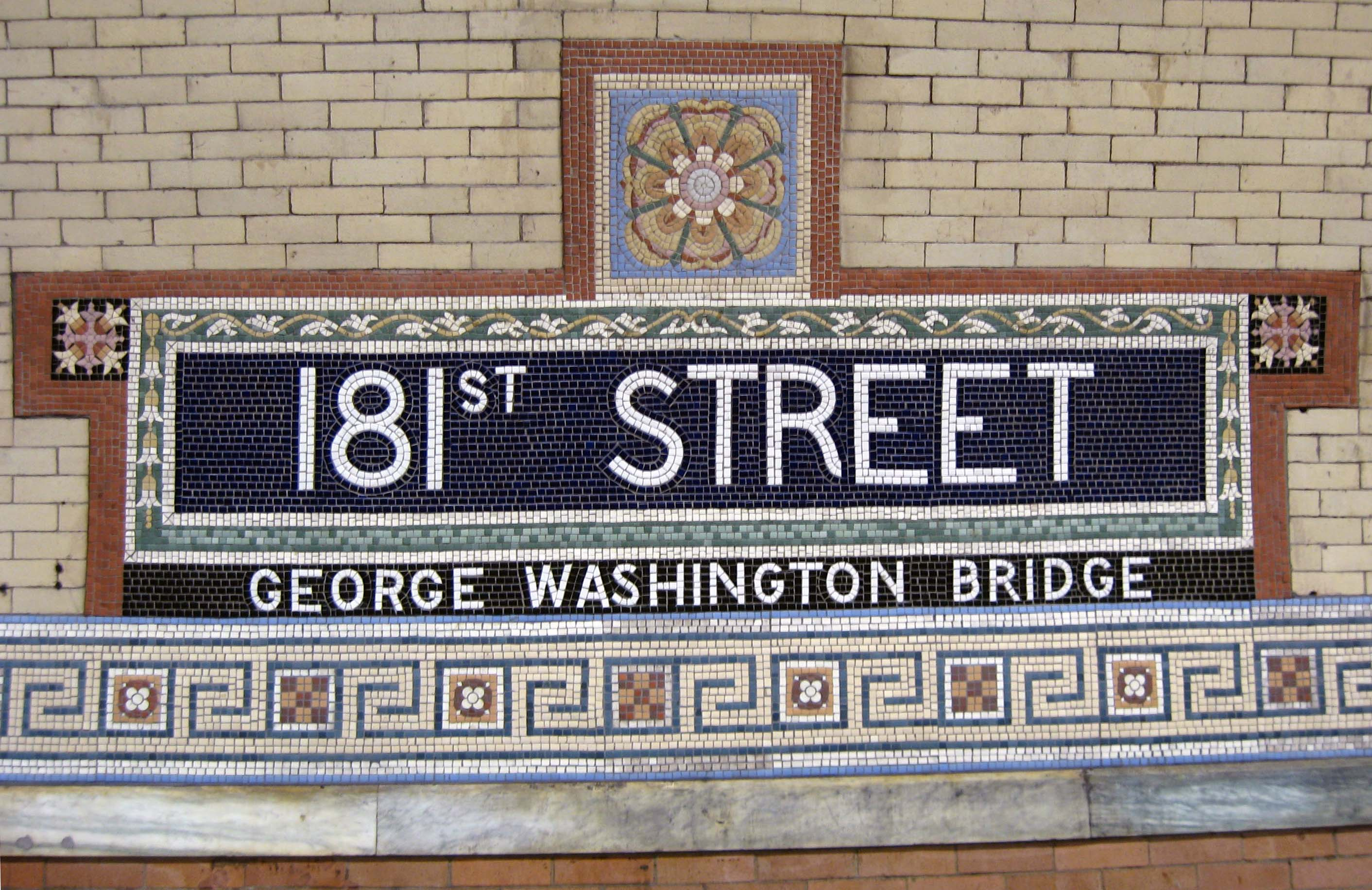
Some of the name plaques contain a tablet with the words "181st Street", beneath which is a secondary tablet with the words "George Washington Bridge".

Much of the station is contained within a vault that measures 50 feet (15 m) wide. The lowest 6 feet (1.8 m) of the vault walls are wainscoted with rust-colored brick. Atop the brick wainscoting are a belt course made of marble and a multicolored mosaic frieze measuring about 16 inches (410 mm) thick. The tops of the walls contain tan brick. Tile name tablets are placed above the frieze at regular intervals, with white letters on a dark background surrounded by floral designs. Some of these plaques consist of a single mosaic tablet with the words "181st Street / George Washington Bridge" on two lines of text, in reference to the nearby George Washington Bridge. Others contain a primary plaque with the words "181st Street", a secondary plaque with the words "George Washington Bridge" beneath it, and a mosaic flower atop the primary plaque.

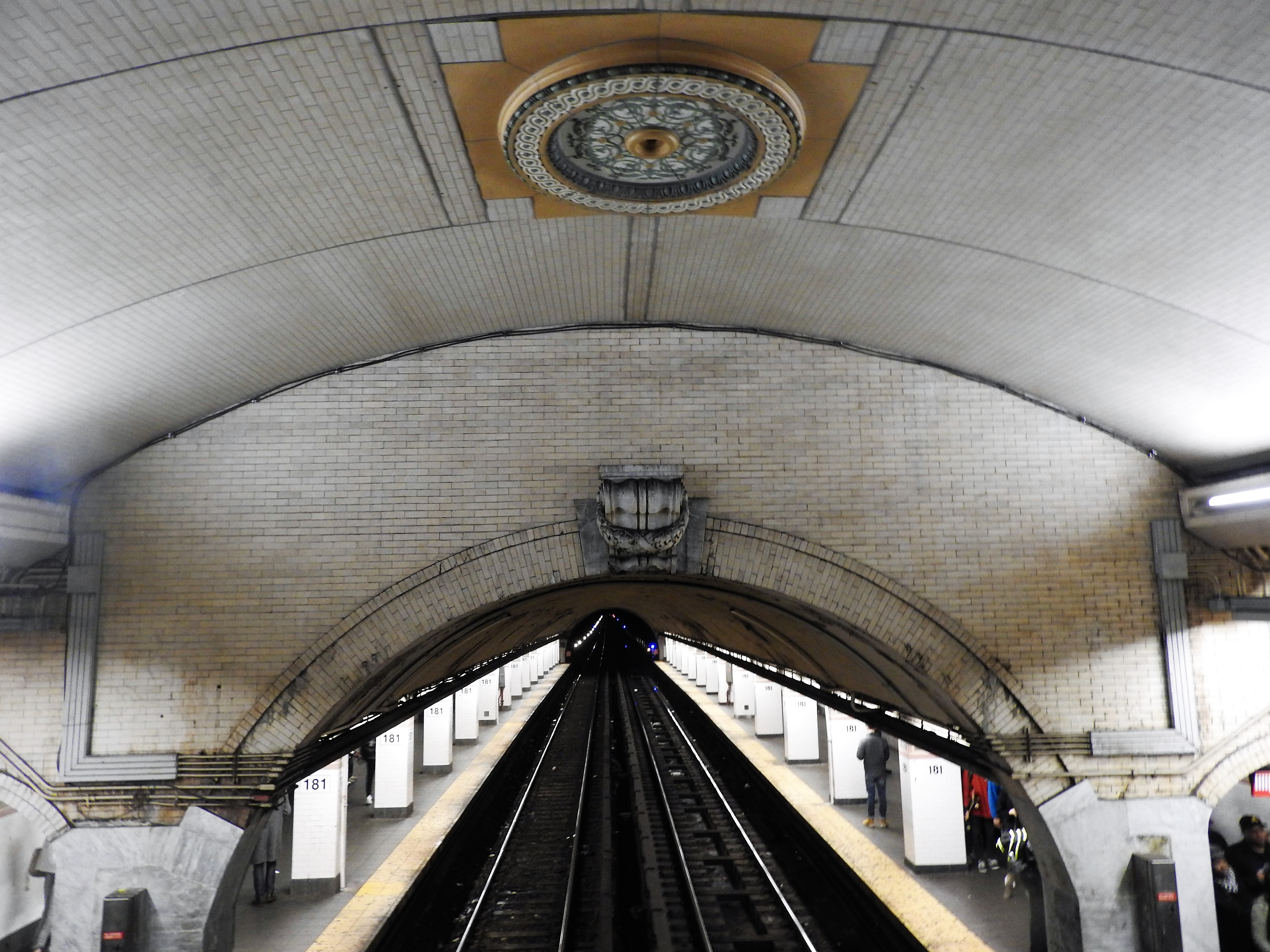
The station ceiling

The top of the vault ceiling is approximately three stories above the platform level. The center of the vault ceiling has six multicolored terracotta medallions at regular intervals; these formerly held lighting fixtures. The medallions contain foliate rings surrounded by egg-and-dart moldings, followed by guilloche moldings. Similar, smaller rosettes are on the side walls of the vault. The modern lighting fixtures are fluorescent tubes on the vault walls.

The station's platform extensions have ceilings that are 10 to 12 feet (3.0 to 3.7 m) above the platform level. At the portals between the original vault and the much lower ceilings of the platform extensions, there is a wide arch over the tracks flanked by narrow arches over each platform. These transitions are clad with tan brick. The arch over the tracks has a volute with a laurel wreath. The walls of the platform extensions have white ceramic tiles with mosaic friezes as well as plaques with the words "181st Street / George Washington Bridge". The walls are divided every 15 feet (4.6 m) by multicolored tile pilasters that are 16 inches (410 mm) wide. Columns near the platform edge, clad with white tile, support the jack-arched concrete station roof.

The northern elevator mezzanine is the only one that is open to the public, as the southern mezzanine was shuttered in 1981 when that elevator bank closed. The walls of the mezzanine and connecting passageways are clad with white ceramic tiles, while the tops of the walls contain multicolored friezes similar to at platform level. The mezzanine and passageway ceilings are made of concrete. The fare control area contains two retail spaces and is clad with ceramic and glazed tile.

=== Exits ===
There are two exits to this station, one at either eastern corner of St. Nicholas Avenue and 181st Street. The northeast-corner entrance is inside a building and the southeast-corner entrance is on the street. The station serves Yeshiva University and the George Washington Bridge Bus Terminal.

== See also ==
- National Register of Historic Places listings in Manhattan above 110th Street
