= 207th Street station =

New York City Subway station in Manhattan

207 Street
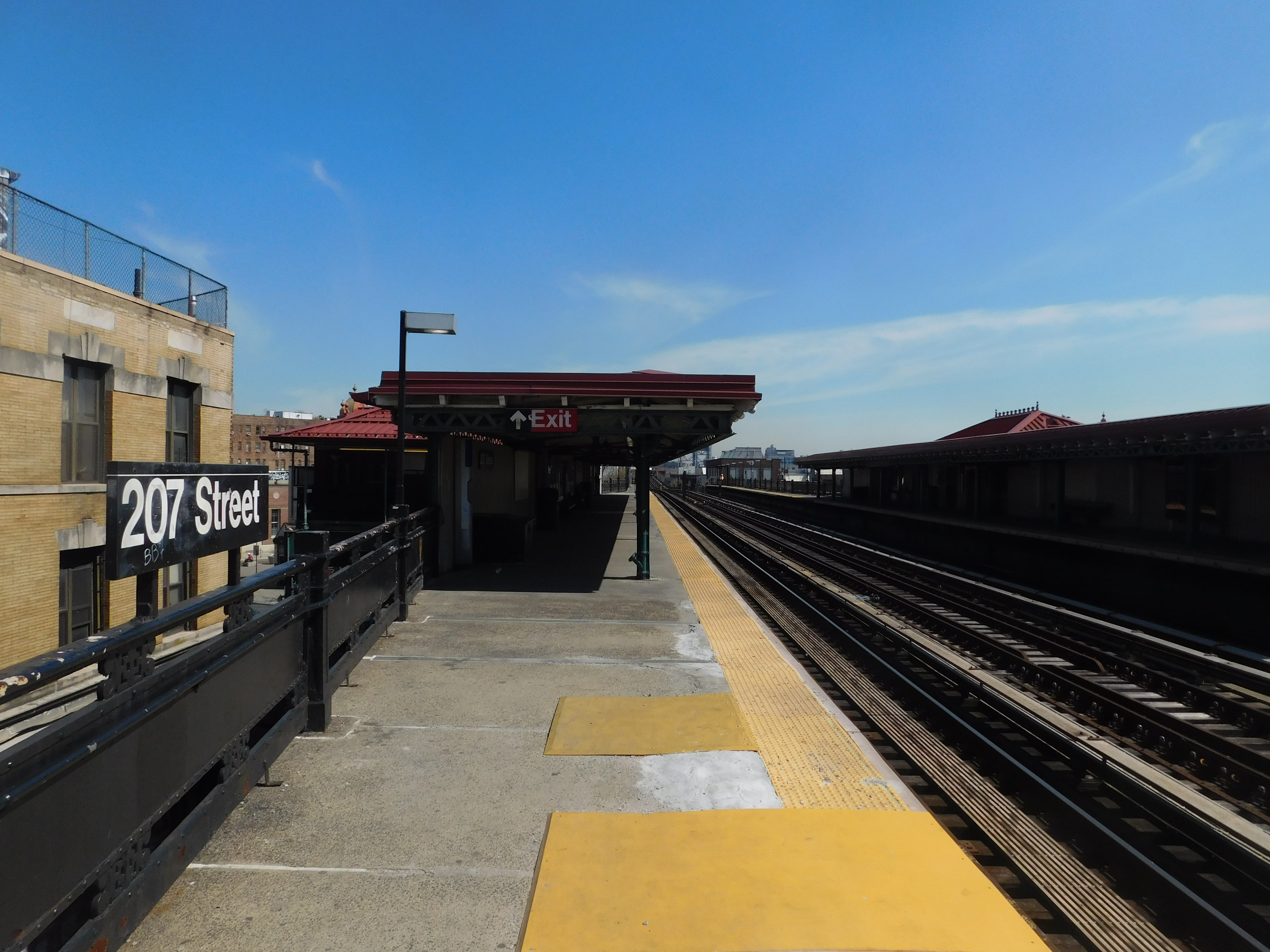
- 207th Street station in April 2025.

Station statistics
- Address: West 207th Street and 10th Avenue; New York, New York
- Borough: Manhattan
- Locale: Inwood
- Coordinates: 40.8644°N 73.9189°W
- Division: A (IRT)
- Line: IRT Broadway–Seventh Avenue Line
- Services: 1 (all times)
- Transit: NYCT Bus: M100, Bx12, Bx12 SBS
- Structure: Elevated
- Platforms: 2 side platforms
- Tracks: 3 (2 in regular service)

Other information
- Opened: April 1, 1907 (119 years ago)
- Accessible: No; planned

Traffic
- 2025: 1,346,653 ▲7.6%
- Rank: 249 out of 423
Services
Preceding station	New York City Subway	Following station
215th Street toward Van Cortlandt Park–242nd Street	Local	Dyckman Street toward South Ferry
Location
Location within New York City Subway
Location within New York City
Location within New York
Track layout
Street map
Station service legend
Symbol	Description
Stops all times	Stops all times

The 207th Street station is a local station on the IRT Broadway–Seventh Avenue Line of the New York City Subway. Located at the intersection of 207th Street and 10th Avenue in the Inwood neighborhood of Manhattan, it is served by the 1 train at all times.

Built by the Interborough Rapid Transit Company (IRT), the station opened on April 1, 1907, as part of the first subway. The northbound platform was lengthened in 1910 while the southbound platform was lengthened in 1948.

== History ==
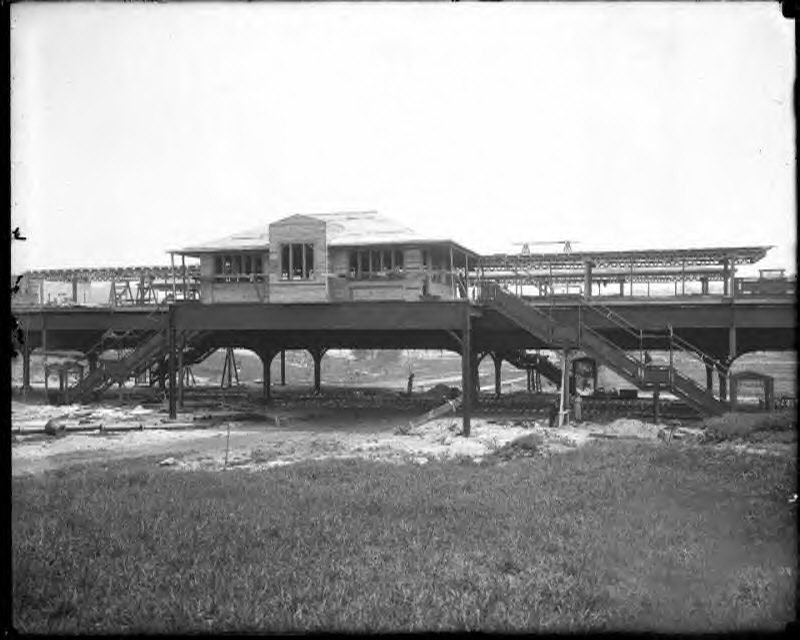
207th Street station under construction in 1906, before development in the surrounding area took shape

This station was completed in 1906, but since it was in a sparsely populated location, it did not open until April 1, 1907.

To address overcrowding, in 1909, the New York Public Service Commission proposed lengthening the platforms at stations along the original IRT subway. As part of a modification to the IRT's construction contracts made on January 18, 1910, the company was to lengthen station platforms to accommodate ten-car express and six-car local trains. In addition to $1.5 million (equivalent to $51.8 million in 2025) spent on platform lengthening, $500,000 (equivalent to $17.3 million in 2025) was spent on building additional entrances and exits. It was anticipated that these improvements would increase capacity by 25 percent. The northbound platform at the 207th Street station was extended 100 feet (30 m) to the north. The southbound platform was not lengthened. Six-car local trains began operating in October 1910, and ten-car express trains began running on the West Side Line on January 24, 1911. Subsequently, the station could accommodate six-car local trains, but ten-car trains could not open some of their doors.

A subway crash occurred at the station in 1916, in which one train telescoped into another train. One motorman was badly injured, and twelve of the more than 200 passengers on the trains suffered minor injuries.

The city government took over the IRT's operations on June 12, 1940. Platforms at IRT Broadway–Seventh Avenue Line stations between 103rd Street and 238th Street, including those at 207th Street, were lengthened to 514 feet (157 m) between 1946 and 1948, allowing full ten-car express trains to stop at these stations. A contract for the platform extensions at 207th Street and five other stations on the line was awarded to the Rao Electrical Equipment Company and the Kaplan Electric Company in June 1946. The platform extensions at these stations were opened in stages. On July 9, 1948, the platform extensions at stations between 207th Street and 238th Street were opened for use at the cost of $423,000. At the same time, the IRT routes were given numbered designations with the introduction of "R-type" rolling stock, which contained rollsigns with numbered designations for each service. The route to 242nd Street became known as the 1.

From January 5 to December 20, 2019, a free out-of-system transfer was provided from this station to Inwood–207th Street to accommodate the temporary closure of the IRT platforms at 168th Street, where a free transfer was normally provided. A similar transfer was also provided one station north at 215th Street.

As part of its 2025–2029 Capital Program, the MTA has proposed making the station wheelchair-accessible in compliance with the Americans with Disabilities Act of 1990.

== Station layout ==
This elevated station has two side platforms and three tracks, with the center track not used in revenue service. The station is served by the 1 at all times and is between 215th Street to the north and Dyckman Street to the south. Both platforms have beige windscreens and dark canopies (both of which are currently being replaced as part of a renovation project) in the center, and black steel waist-high fences at either end. The station name plates are in the standard black with white lettering.

North of this station, there are two switches and a ramp to allow access from each of the three tracks to the 207th Street Yard, which runs along the east side of the line.

The 1991 artwork here is called Elevated Nature I-IV by Wopo Holup. It consists of two concrete panels with wooden frames on the southbound platform's station house. Each panel consists of eight squares depicting tree limbs. Similar artwork is also located at four other stations on this line.

=== Exits ===
Both platforms have one wooden adjacent station house in the center. However, only the southbound one is used for passenger service. Doors from the platform lead to a small waiting area, where a turnstile bank provides entrance/exit from the station. Outside the fare control area, there is a token booth, one staircase going down to the southwest corner of 207th Street and Tenth Avenue, and a passageway leading to a staircase that goes down to the northwest corner.

The station house on the northbound platform is used for employees only. One exit-only turnstile at platform level leads to a staircase that goes down to the northeast corner of 207th Street and Tenth Avenue, while a High Entry/Exit Turnstile, also at platform level, leads to a staircase going down to the southeast corner.
