= 221st Street station =

New York City Subway station in Manhattan (closed 1907)

221st Street
- Former New York City Subway station
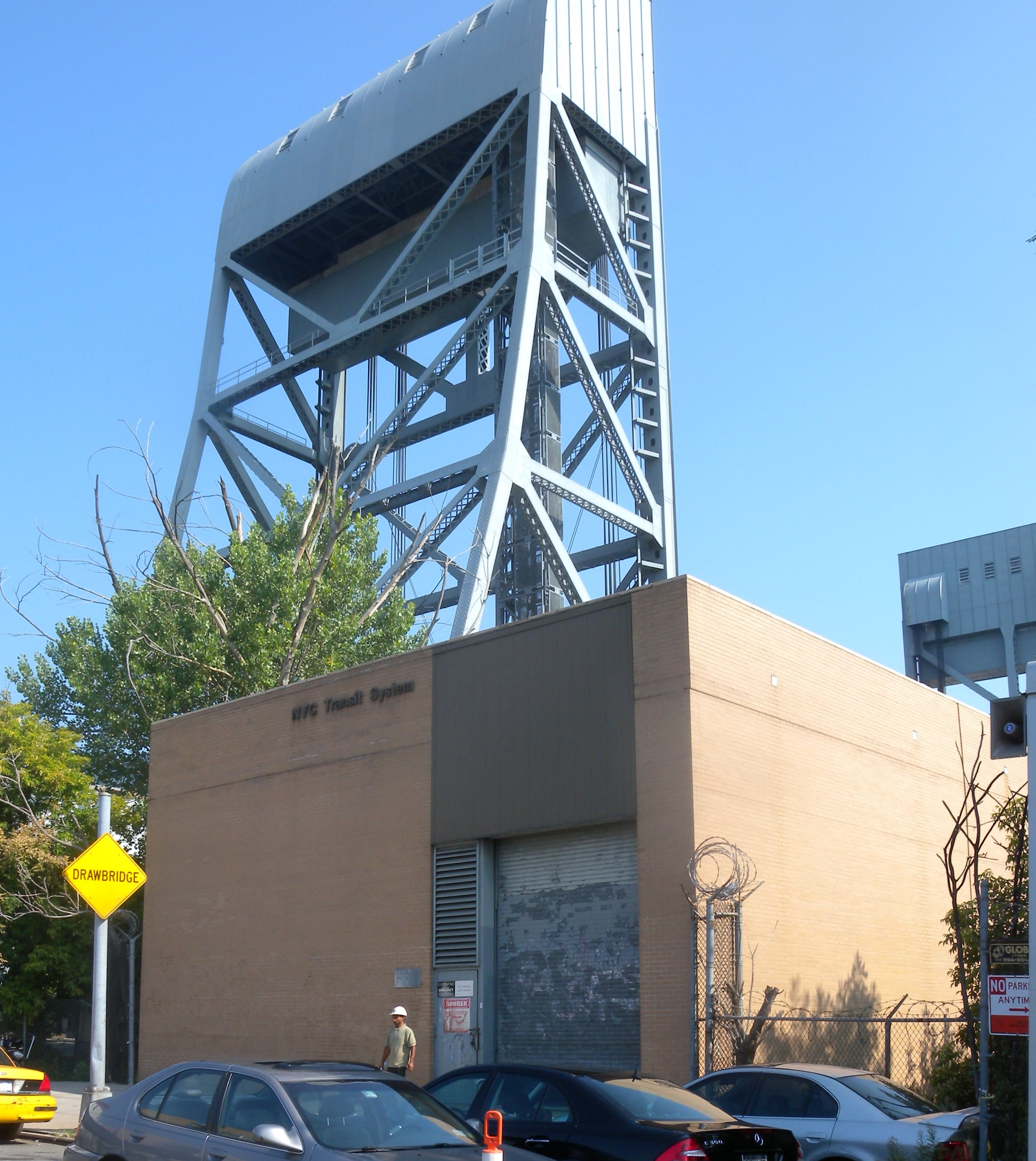
- The Harlem River Substation near the site of the former 221st Street station.

Station statistics
- Address: 221st Street and Broadway; New York, NY 10034
- Borough: Manhattan
- Locale: Inwood
- Coordinates: 40.872921°N 73.912015°W
- Division: A (IRT)
- Line: IRT Broadway–Seventh Avenue Line
- Services: None (demolished)
- Structure: Elevated
- Platforms: 2 side platforms
- Tracks: 3

Other information
- Opened: March 12, 1906; 119 years ago
- Closed: January 14, 1907; 118 years ago

Station succession
- Next north: Marble Hill–225th Street
- Next south: 215th Street
Location

Street map

The 221st Street station was a local station on the IRT Broadway–Seventh Avenue Line of the New York City Subway, located at the intersection of Broadway and 221st Street in Inwood, Manhattan. It operated for less than a year.

== History ==
The West Side Branch of the first subway was extended northward from the line's previous terminus at 157th Street to 221st Street, which served as the line's temporary terminus, on March 12, 1906. This extension was served by shuttle trains operating between 157th Street and 221st Street until May 30, 1906, when express trains began running through to 221st Street.

The station was closed with the extension of service over the new Broadway Bridge to Marble Hill–225th Street on January 14, 1907. After service was discontinued at 221st Street, the structure was dismantled and moved to 230th Street and Broadway for a new temporary terminus.
