= 79th Street station (IRT Broadway–Seventh Avenue Line) =

New York City Subway station in Manhattan

79 Street
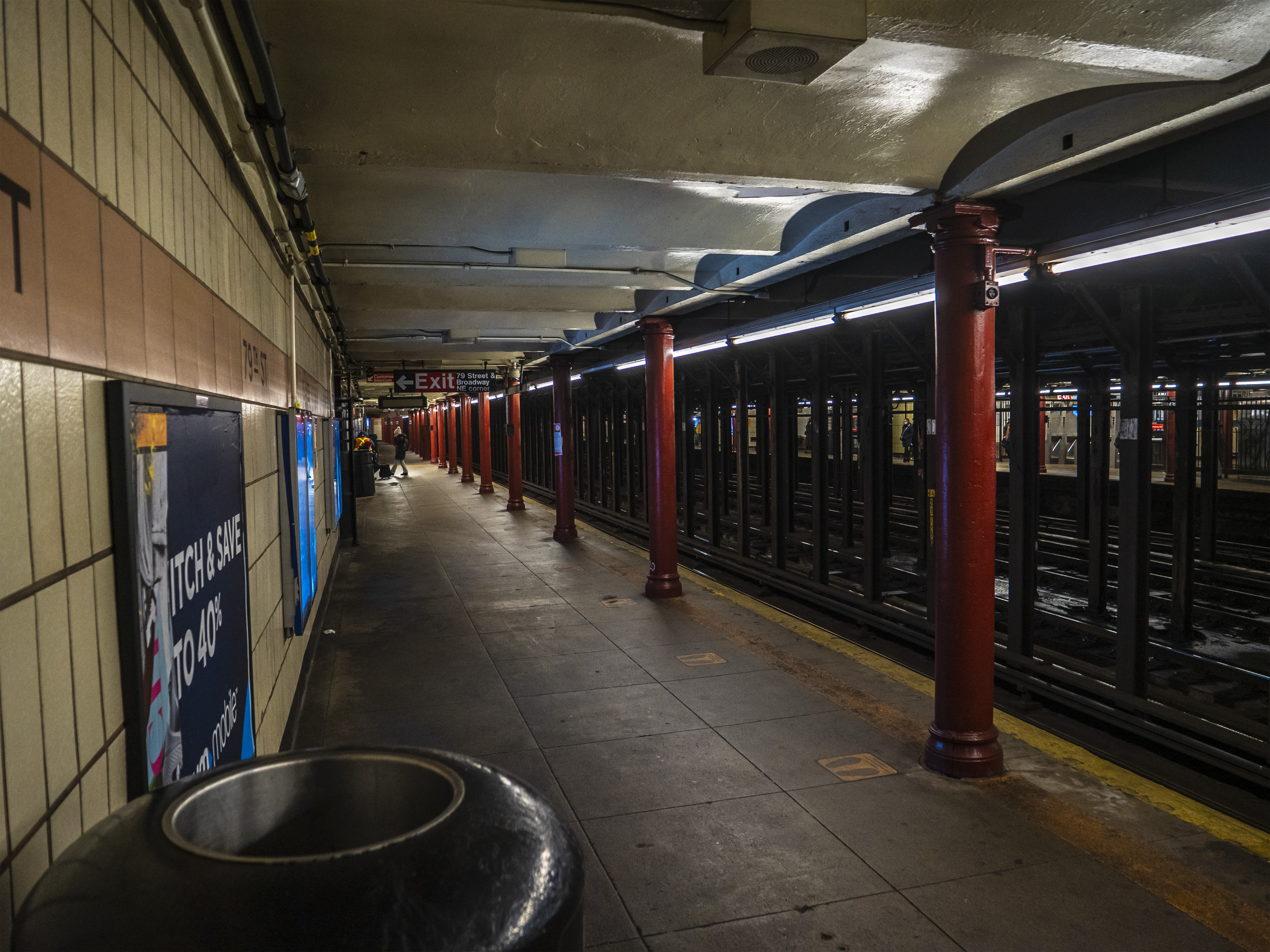
- View from northbound platform

Station statistics
- Address: West 79th Street & Broadway; New York, New York
- Borough: Manhattan
- Locale: Upper West Side
- Coordinates: 40.784°N 73.98°W
- Division: A (IRT)
- Line: IRT Broadway–Seventh Avenue Line
- Services: 1 (all times); 2 (late nights)
- Transit: NYCT Bus: M79 SBS, M104
- Structure: Underground
- Platforms: 2 side platforms
- Tracks: 4

Other information
- Opened: October 27, 1904; 121 years ago

Traffic
- 2025: 3,842,333 ▲18%
- Rank: 92 out of 423
Services
Preceding station	New York City Subway	Following station
86th Street 1 2 toward Van Cortlandt Park–242nd Street	Local	72nd Street 1 2 toward South Ferry
does not stop here
Location
Location within New York City Subway
Location within New York City
Location within New York
Track layout
Street map
Station service legend
Symbol	Description
Stops all times	Stops all times
Stops late nights only	Stops late nights only
- 79th Street Subway Station (IRT)
- U.S. National Register of Historic Places
- New York City Landmark
- MPS: New York City Subway System MPS
- NRHP reference No.: 04001018
- NYCL No.: 1096

Significant dates
- Added to NRHP: September 17, 2004
- Designated NYCL: October 23, 1979

The 79th Street station is a local station on the IRT Broadway–Seventh Avenue Line of the New York City Subway. Located at the intersection of 79th Street and Broadway on the Upper West Side of Manhattan, it is served by the 1 train at all times and the 2 train during late nights.

The 79th Street station was constructed for the Interborough Rapid Transit Company (IRT) as part of the city's first subway line, which was approved in 1900. Construction of the line segment that includes the 79th Street station began on August 22 of the same year. The station opened on October 27, 1904, as one of the original 28 stations of the New York City Subway. The station's platforms have been lengthened since opening.

The 79th Street station contains two side platforms and four tracks; express trains use the inner two tracks to bypass the station. The station was built with tile and mosaic decorations, although most of the original design has been replaced with a cinder block design. The platforms contain exits to 79th Street and Broadway and are not connected to each other within fare control. The remaining portion of the original station interior is a New York City designated landmark and listed on the National Register of Historic Places.

== History ==
=== Construction and opening ===
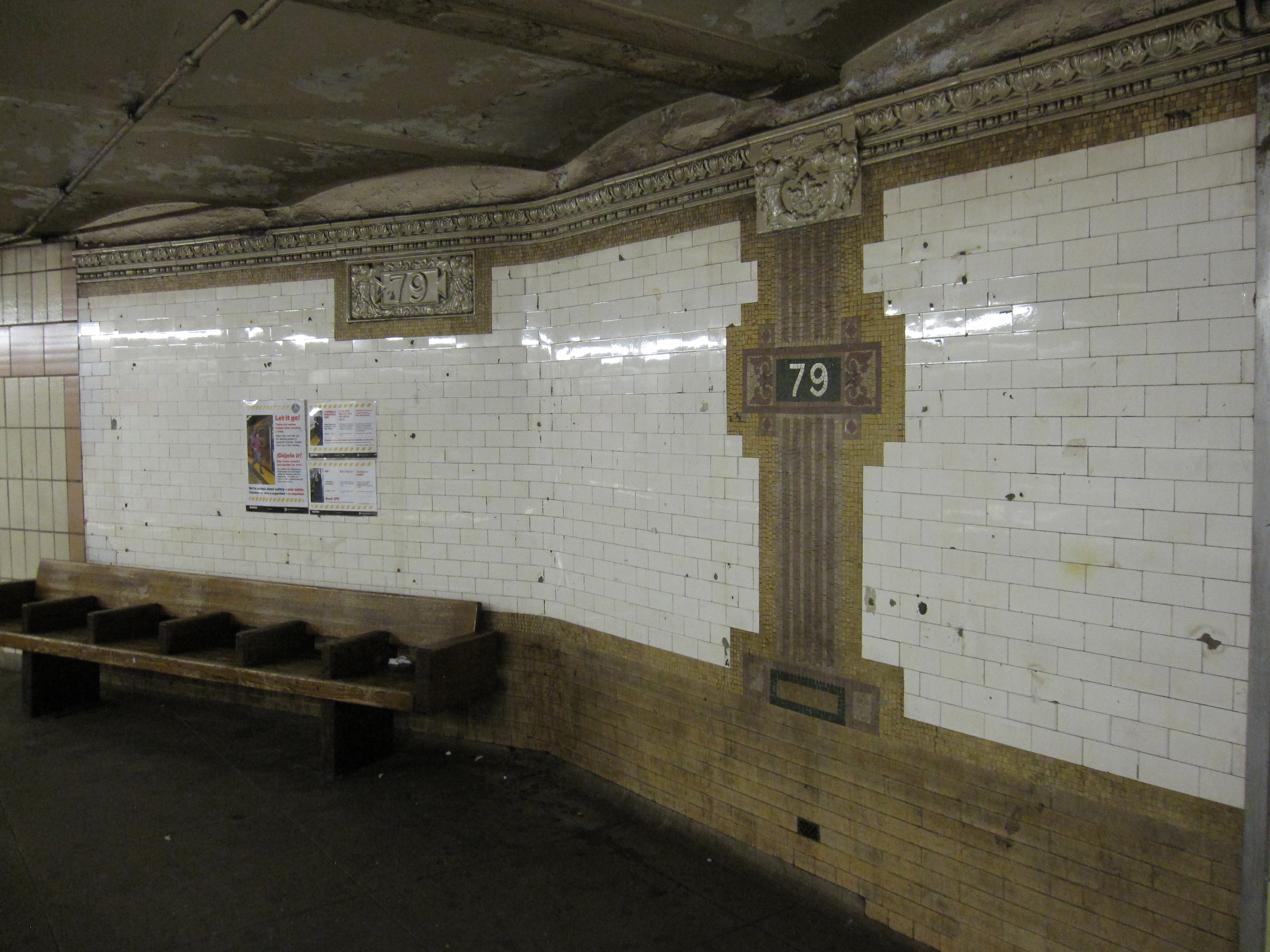
Original wall decorations and mosaics

Planning for a subway line in New York City dates to 1864, but development of what became the city's first subway line did not start until 1894, when the New York State Legislature passed the Rapid Transit Act. The subway plans were drawn up by a team of engineers led by William Barclay Parsons, the Rapid Transit Commission's chief engineer. It called for a subway line from New York City Hall in lower Manhattan to the Upper West Side, where two branches would lead north into the Bronx. A plan was formally adopted in 1897, and all legal conflicts over the route alignment were resolved near the end of 1899.

The Rapid Transit Construction Company, organized by John B. McDonald and funded by August Belmont Jr., signed the initial Contract 1 with the Rapid Transit Commission in February 1900, under which it would construct the subway and maintain a 50-year operating lease from the opening of the line. In 1901, the firm of Heins & LaFarge was hired to design the underground stations. Belmont incorporated the Interborough Rapid Transit Company (IRT) in April 1902 to operate the subway.

The 79th Street station was constructed as part of the IRT's West Side Line (now the Broadway–Seventh Avenue Line) from 60th Street to 82nd Street, for which work had begun on August 22, 1900. Work for that section had been awarded to William Bradley. By late 1903, the subway was nearly complete, but the IRT Powerhouse and the system's electrical substations were still under construction, delaying the system's opening. The 79th Street station opened on October 27, 1904, as one of the original 28 stations of the New York City Subway from City Hall to 145th Street on the West Side Branch. The opening of the first subway line, and particularly the 79th Street station, helped contribute to the development of the Upper West Side. The Apthorp apartment building, just outside one of the station's exits, was built in anticipation of the 79th Street station's opening.

=== Service changes and station renovations ===
==== 1910s to 1930s ====
After the first subway line was completed in 1908, the station was served by local trains along both the West Side (now the Broadway–Seventh Avenue Line to Van Cortlandt Park–242nd Street) and East Side (now the Lenox Avenue Line). West Side local trains had their southern terminus at City Hall during rush hours and South Ferry at other times, and had their northern terminus at 242nd Street. East Side local trains ran from City Hall to Lenox Avenue (145th Street).

To address overcrowding, in 1909, the New York Public Service Commission proposed lengthening the platforms at stations along the original IRT subway. As part of a modification to the IRT's construction contracts made on January 18, 1910, the company was to lengthen station platforms to accommodate ten-car express and six-car local trains. In addition to $1.5 million (equivalent to $51.8 million in 2025) spent on platform lengthening, $500,000 (equivalent to $17.3 million in 2025) was spent on building additional entrances and exits. It was anticipated that these improvements would increase capacity by 25 percent. Platforms at local stations, such as the 79th Street station, were lengthened by between 20 and 30 feet (6.1 and 9.1 m). Both platforms were extended to the north and south. Six-car local trains began operating in October 1910. The Broadway–Seventh Avenue Line opened south of Times Square–42nd Street in 1918, and the original line was divided into an H-shaped system. The original subway north of Times Square thus became part of the Broadway–Seventh Avenue Line, and all local trains were sent to South Ferry.

In December 1922, the Transit Commission approved a $3 million (equivalent to $57,703,777 in 2025) project to lengthen platforms at 14 local stations along the original IRT line, including 79th Street and five other stations on the Broadway–Seventh Avenue Line. Platform lengths at these stations would be increased from 225 to 436 feet (69 to 133 m). The commission postponed the platform-lengthening project in September 1923, at which point the cost had risen to $5.6 million (equivalent to $105,820,313 in 2025).

==== 1940s to 1960s ====
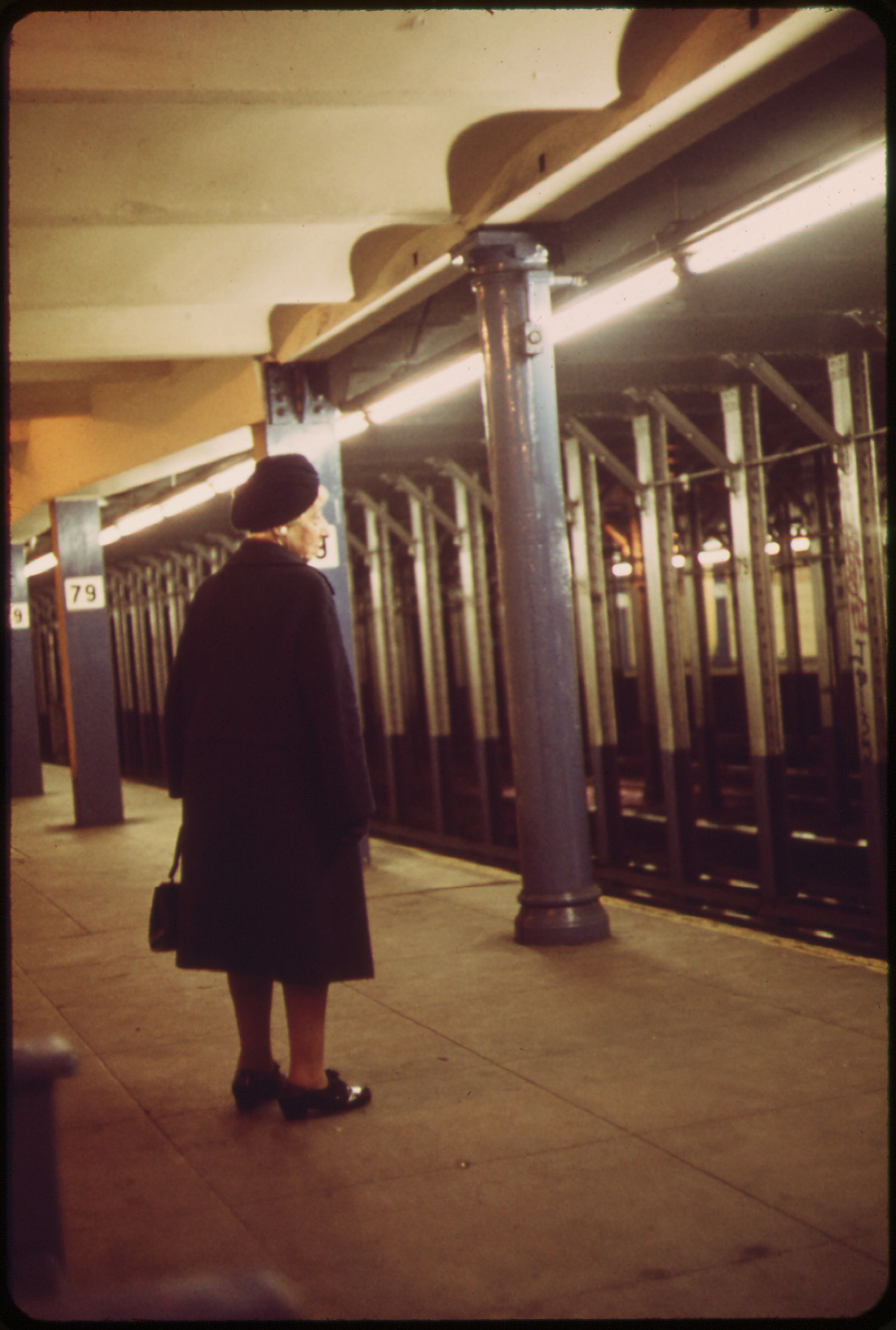
Woman waiting for the train, May 1973

The city government took over the IRT's operations on June 12, 1940. The IRT routes were given numbered designations in 1948 with the introduction of "R-type" rolling stock, which contained rollsigns with numbered designations for each service. The Broadway route to 242nd Street became known as the 1 and the Lenox Avenue route as the 3.

The original IRT stations north of Times Square could barely fit local trains of five or six cars depending on the configuration of the trains. Stations on the line from 50th Street to 96th Street, including this station but excluding the 91st Street station, had their platforms extended in the 1950s to accommodate ten-car trains as part of a $100 million (equivalent to $1.104452055×10^{9} in 2025) rebuilding program. The contract to extend the platforms at 79th Street and 86th Street was awarded to Delma Engineering Corporation for $1,867,705 in 1957 (equivalent to $21,410,000 in 2025). The platform extensions at the local stations were completed by early 1958. Once the project was completed, all 1 trains became local and all 2 and 3 trains became express, and eight-car local trains began operation. Increased and lengthened service was implemented during peak hours on the 1 train on February 6, 1959. Due to the lengthening of the platforms at 86th Street and 96th Street, the intermediate 91st Street station was closed on February 2, 1959, because it was too close to the other two stations.

In November 1959, the Warshaw Construction Company received a contract to remove fifteen entrance/exit kiosks on IRT lines, including two at the 79th Street station. This was part of a citywide initiative to remove the kiosks, which obstructed motorists' views of pedestrians. On June 28, 1964, the New York City Transit Authority (NYCTA) awarded a contract to construct additional entrances at the station to Delma Engineering Corporation for $212,874 (equivalent to $2,209,824 in 2025). Work on the project was still underway in 1967.

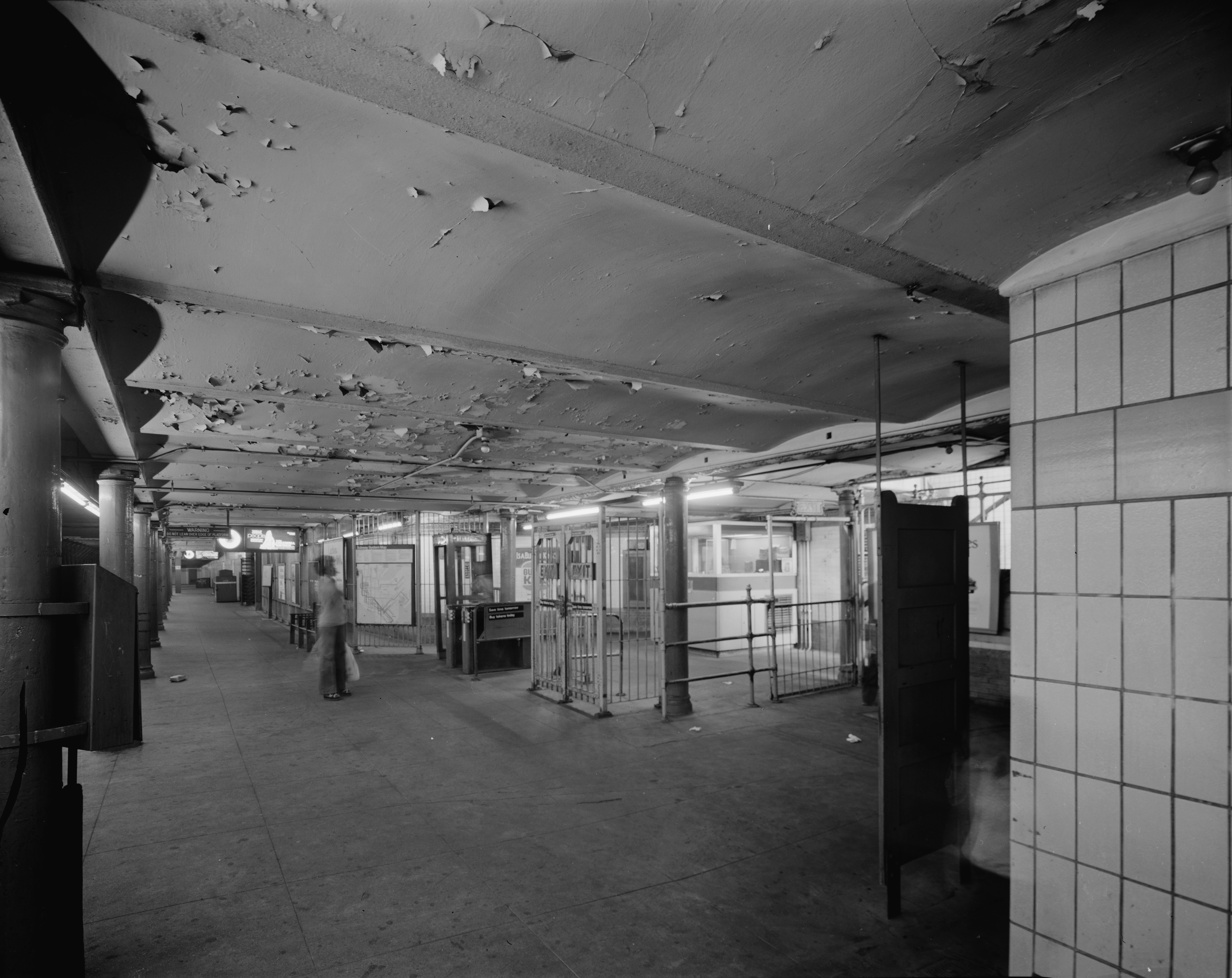
The uptown platform and control area in 1978

==== 1970s to present ====
In April 1988, the NYCTA unveiled plans to speed up service on the Broadway–Seventh Avenue Line through the implementation of a skip-stop service: the 9 train. When skip-stop service started in 1989, it was only implemented north of 137th Street–City College on weekdays, and 79th Street was served by both the 1 and the 9. Skip-stop service ended on May 27, 2005, as a result of a decrease in the number of riders who benefited.

In 1979, the New York City Landmarks Preservation Commission designated the space within the boundaries of the original station, excluding expansions made after 1904, as a city landmark. The station was designated along with eleven others on the original IRT. The original interiors were listed on the National Register of Historic Places in 2004. The southbound platform was closed for structural work in February 2024, followed by the northbound platform in March 2024. After the death of local businessman Saul Zabar (who owned Zabar's delicatessen), the MTA installed a poster commemorating him in late 2025, and New York Assemblymember Linda Rosenthal introduced legislation in March 2026 to rename the station "79th Street–Saul Zabar station".

== Station layout ==
Like other local stations, 79th Street has four tracks and two side platforms. The station is served by the 1 at all times and by the 2 during late nights; the center express tracks are used by the 2 train during daytime hours and the 3 train at all times. The station is between 86th Street to the north and 72nd Street to the south. The platforms were originally 200 feet (61 m) long, like at other local stations on the original IRT, but as a result of the 1958–1959 platform extension, became 525 feet (160 m) long. The station was also originally 55.5 feet (16.9 m) wide.

=== Design ===
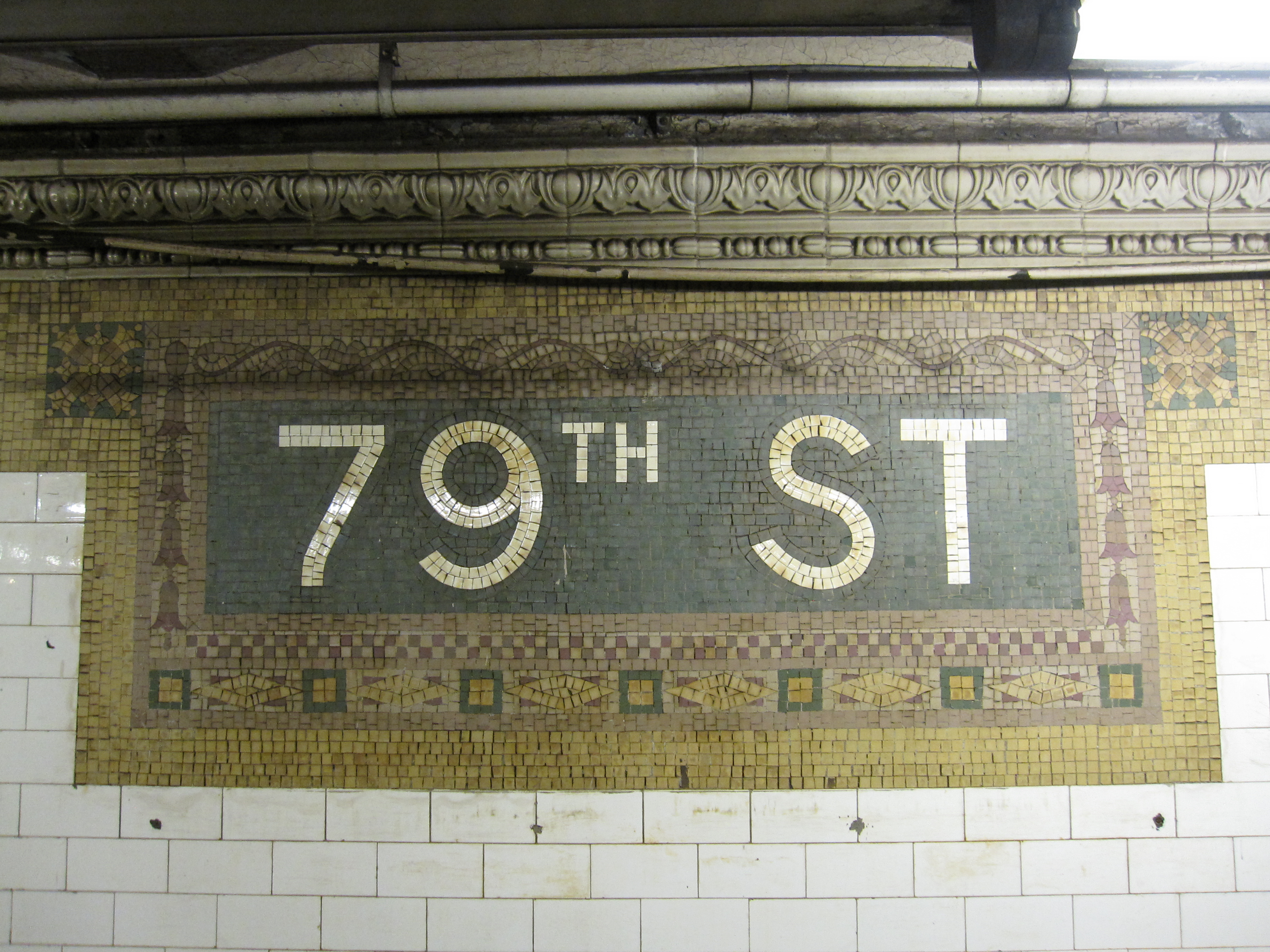
Name in mosaics

As with other stations built as part of the original IRT, the station was constructed using a cut-and-cover method. The tunnel is covered by a U-shaped trough that contains utility pipes and wires. This trough contains a foundation of concrete no less than 4 inches (100 mm) thick. Each platform consists of 3-inch-thick (7.6 cm) concrete slabs, beneath which are drainage basins. The original platforms contain circular, cast-iron Doric-style columns spaced every 15 feet (4.6 m), while the platform extensions contain I-beam columns. Additional columns between the tracks, spaced every 5 feet (1.5 m), support the jack-arched concrete station roofs. The ceiling height varies based on whether there are utilities in the ceiling; the areas without utilities is about 15 feet (4.6 m) above platform level. There is a 1-inch (25 mm) gap between the trough wall and the platform walls, which are made of 4-inch (100 mm)-thick brick covered over by a tiled finish.

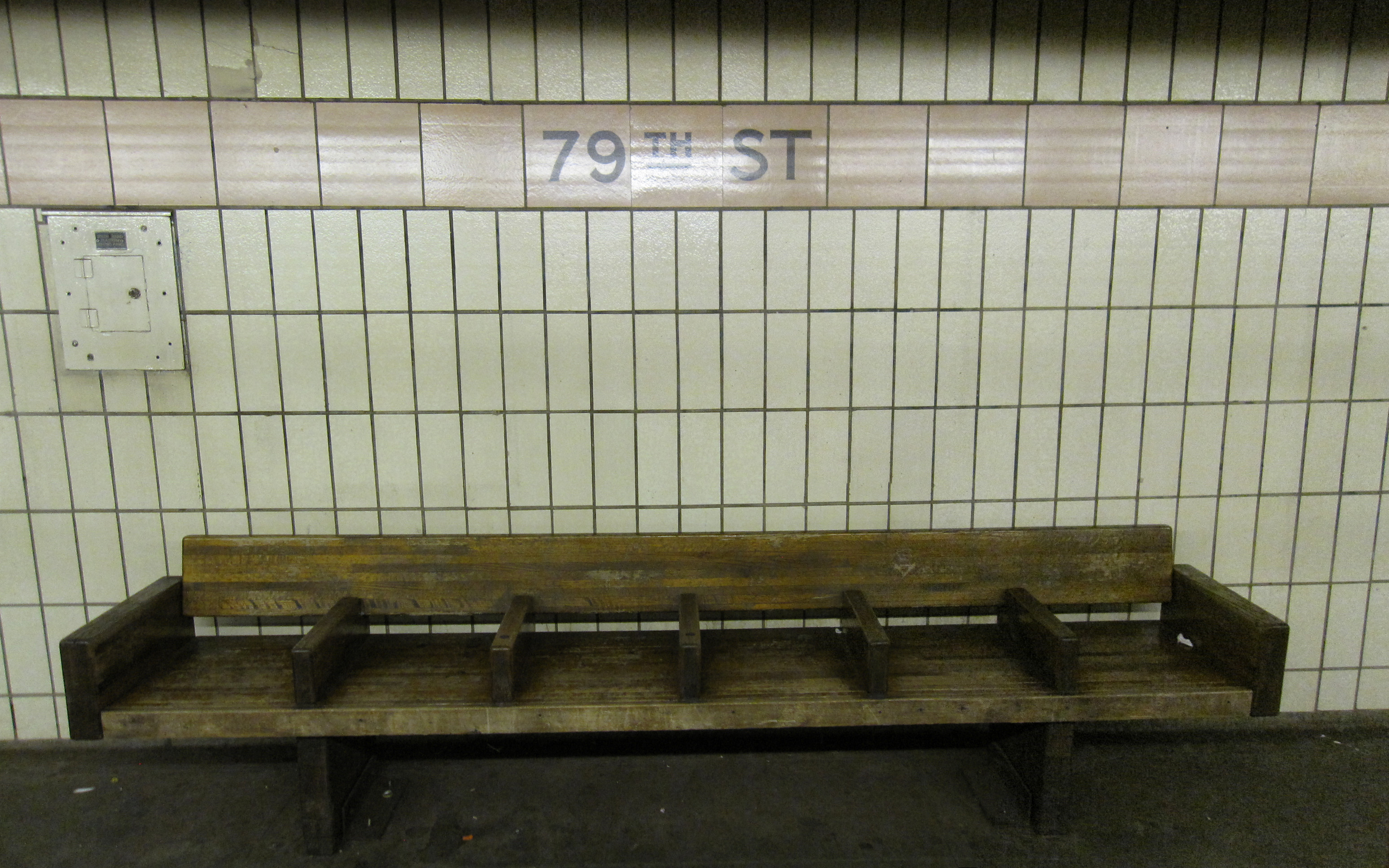
Platform extension tiling

The fare control areas are at platform level, and there is no crossover or crossunder between the platforms. The walls along the platforms near the fare control areas consist of a brick wainscoting on the lowest part of the wall, with bronze air vents along the wainscoting, and white glass tiles above. The platform walls are divided at 15-foot (4.6 m) intervals by buff and salmon tile pilasters, or vertical bands. There are tiled plaques about halfway up each pilaster, with the number "79" in white-on-green tile, and buff-and-salmon foliate designs around them. Atop each pilaster are buff faience plaques depicting two cornucopias around a shield. A cornice with egg-and-dart patterns atop bead-and-reel moldings run atop these walls. The mosaic tiles at all original IRT stations were manufactured by the American Encaustic Tile Company, which subcontracted the installations at each station. The decorative work was performed by tile contractor Alfred Boote Company and faience contractor Rookwood Pottery Company. The ceilings of the original platforms and fare control areas contain plaster molding. The section of the ceiling north of the fare control area is smooth, and the section south of fare control is composed of segmental vaults supported by the center columns.

The remainders of both platforms have cream-colored tiles and a salmon trim line with "79TH ST" written on it in black Sans Serif font at regular intervals. These tiles were installed during the late 1950s renovation.

=== Exits ===
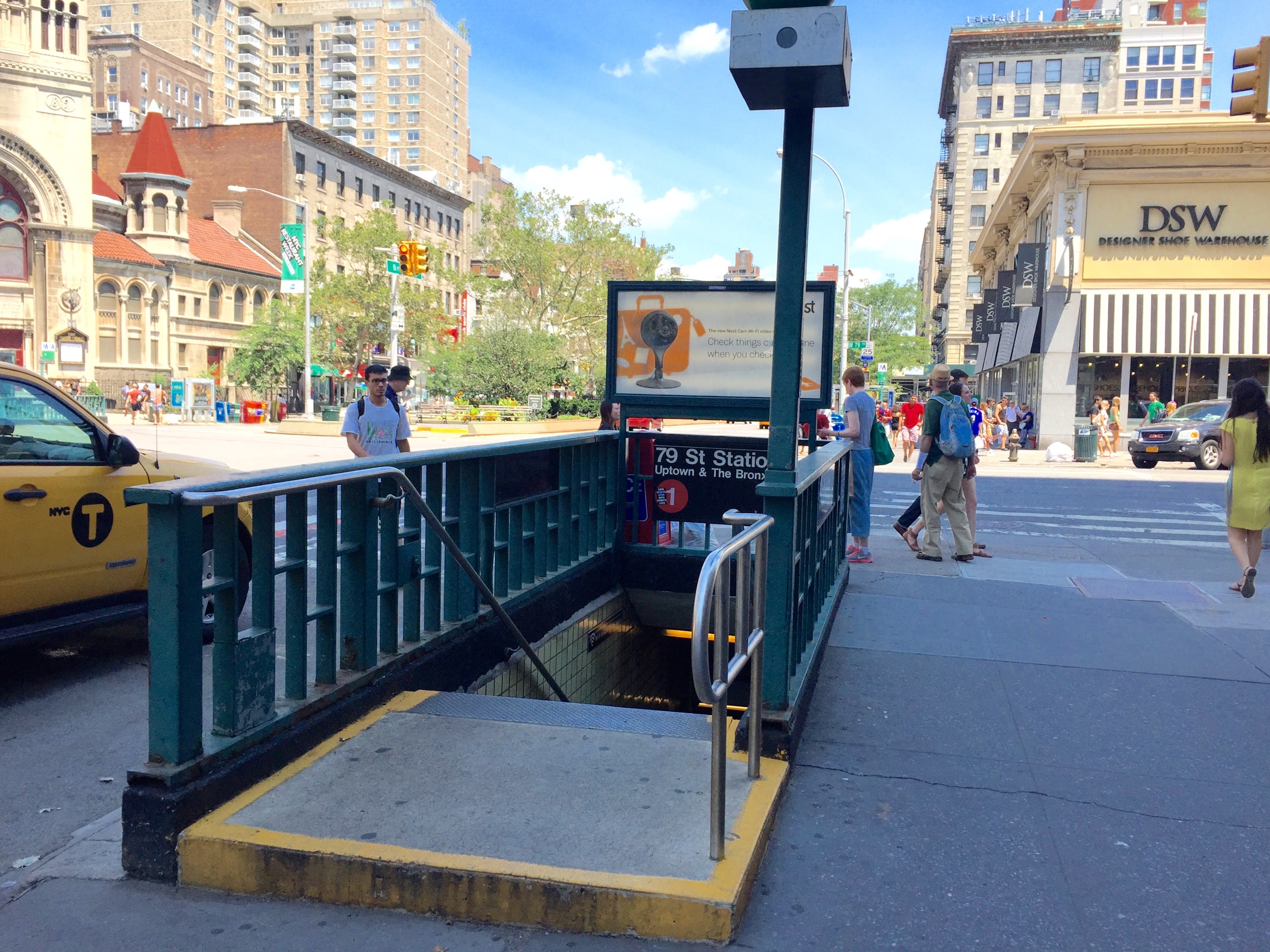
Southeastern corner stairs

The southbound platform is fully staffed, containing a turnstile bank, token booth, staircase going up to the northwest corner of West 79th Street and Broadway, and passageway separated from the platform by a steel fence leading to a staircase that goes up to the southwest corner of the intersection. This passageway has a High Entry-Exit Turnstile to the platform, with walls made of cinder block tiles.

The northbound platform's fare control is unstaffed, containing a turnstile bank, now-closed customer assistance booth, staircase going up to the southeast corner of West 79th Street and Broadway, and passageway separated from the platform by a steel fence leading to a staircase that goes up to the northeast corner of the intersection. This passageway has a High Exit-Only Turnstile to the platform, with walls made of cinder block tiles. The street staircases on both sides contain relatively simple, modern steel railings like those seen at most New York City Subway stations.
