= 1/9 =

1/9 may refer to:

- 1/9 (number), a fraction (one ninth, 1/9)
- 1st Battalion, 9th Marines, an infantry battalion of the US Marine Corps
- January 9 or September 1, depending on date format
- "Breaker 1/9", a song by Common
- Former 1 (New York City Subway service) and 9 (New York City Subway service), which shared the same route
- U.S. Route 1/9, in New Jersey

== See also ==
- 9/1 (disambiguation)
- 1-9 (disambiguation)
