= 1-9 =

1-9 may refer to:

- 0s, the first "decade" of the AD/CE time system (AD 1–9)
- 1% rule (Internet culture), also known as the 1–9–90 rule
- Two services of the New York City Subway which formerly ran together:
  - 1 (New York City Subway service)
  - 9 (New York City Subway service)
- U.S. Route 1/9 concurrency in northern New Jersey
- Emergency telephone number for city police in Morocco
- January 9, 9th day at the 1st month
- September 1, 1st day in the 9th month

== See also ==
- 1/9 (disambiguation)
- Numeral system
