= 9/1 =

9/1 may refer to:

- September 1 (month-day date notation)
- January 9 (day-month date notation)

== See also ==
- 1/9 (disambiguation)
