= 50th Street station (IRT Broadway–Seventh Avenue Line) =

New York City Subway station in Manhattan

50 Street
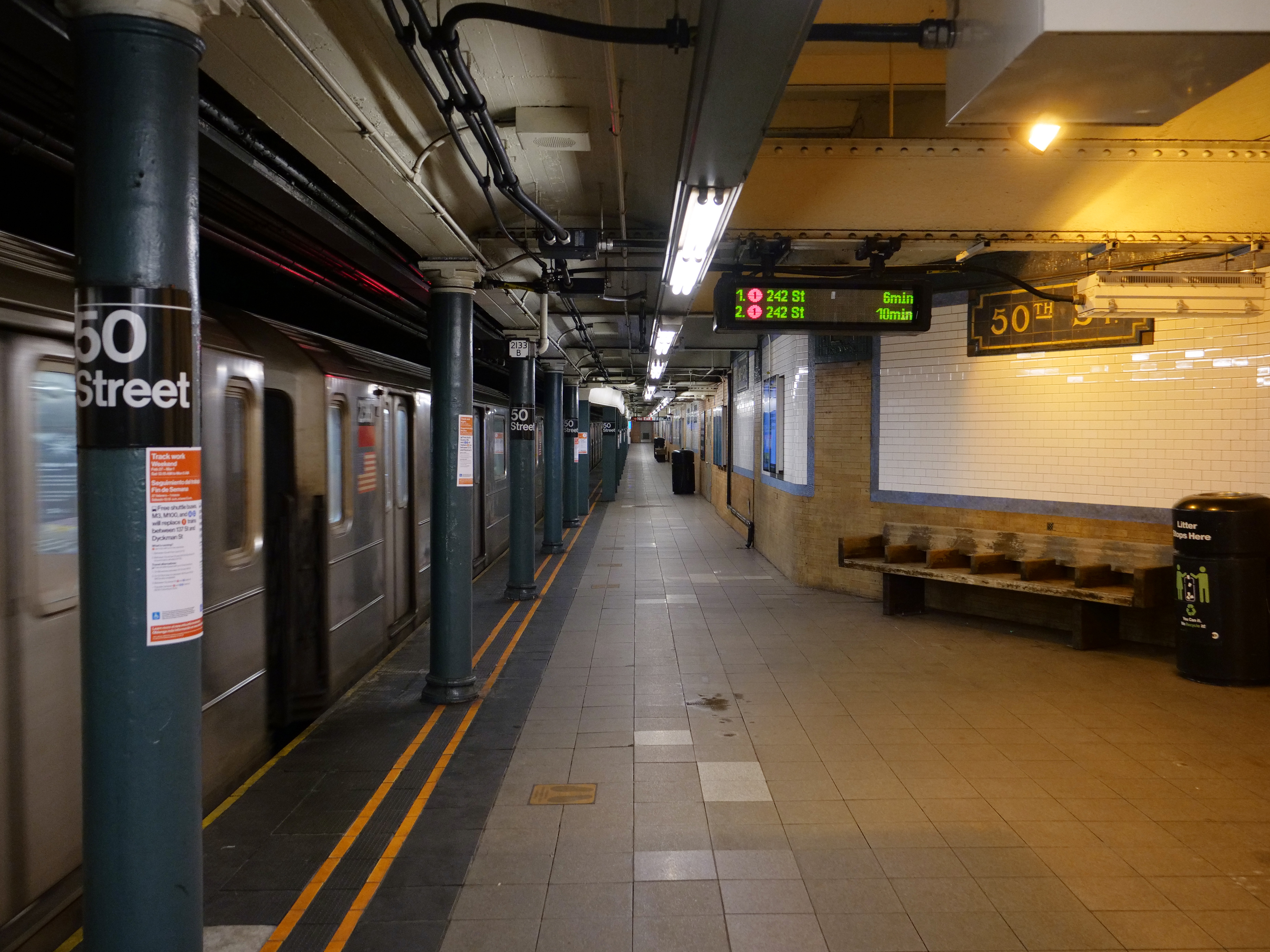
- Northbound 1 train departing

Station statistics
- Address: West 50th Street & Broadway; New York, New York
- Borough: Manhattan
- Locale: Midtown Manhattan
- Coordinates: 40.761°N 73.984°W
- Division: A (IRT)
- Line: IRT Broadway–Seventh Avenue Line
- Services: 1 (all times); 2 (late nights)
- Transit: NYCT Bus: M7, M20, M50, M104; MTA Bus: BxM2
- Structure: Underground
- Platforms: 2 side platforms
- Tracks: 4

Other information
- Opened: October 27, 1904; 122 years ago
- Accessible: No; planned

Traffic
- 2025: 6,486,476 ▲17.8%
- Rank: 37 out of 423
Services
| Preceding station | New York City Subway | Following station |
|---|---|---|
| 59th Street–Columbus Circle 1 2 toward Van Cortlandt Park–242nd Street | Local | Times Square–42nd Street 1 2 toward South Ferry |
does not stop here
Non-revenue services and lines
| Preceding station | New York City Subway | Following station |
|---|---|---|
| | no service | Times Square shuttle |
Location
Location within New York City Subway
Location within New York City
Location within New York
Track layout
Street map
Station service legend
| Symbol | Description |
| Stops all times | Stops all times |
| Stops late nights only | Stops late nights only |

The 50th Street station is a local station on the IRT Broadway–Seventh Avenue Line of the New York City Subway. Located at the intersection of 50th Street and Broadway in the Theater District of Manhattan, it is served by the 1 train at all times and by the 2 train during late nights.

The 50th Street station was constructed for the Interborough Rapid Transit Company (IRT) as part of the city's first subway line, which was approved in 1900. Construction of the line segment that includes the 50th Street station began on September 19 of the same year. The station opened on October 27, 1904, as one of the original 28 stations of the New York City Subway. The station's platforms have been lengthened since opening.

The 50th Street station contains two side platforms and four tracks; express trains use the inner two tracks to bypass the station. The station was built with tile and mosaic decorations. The platforms contain exits to 50th Street and Broadway and are not connected to each other within fare control.

== History ==
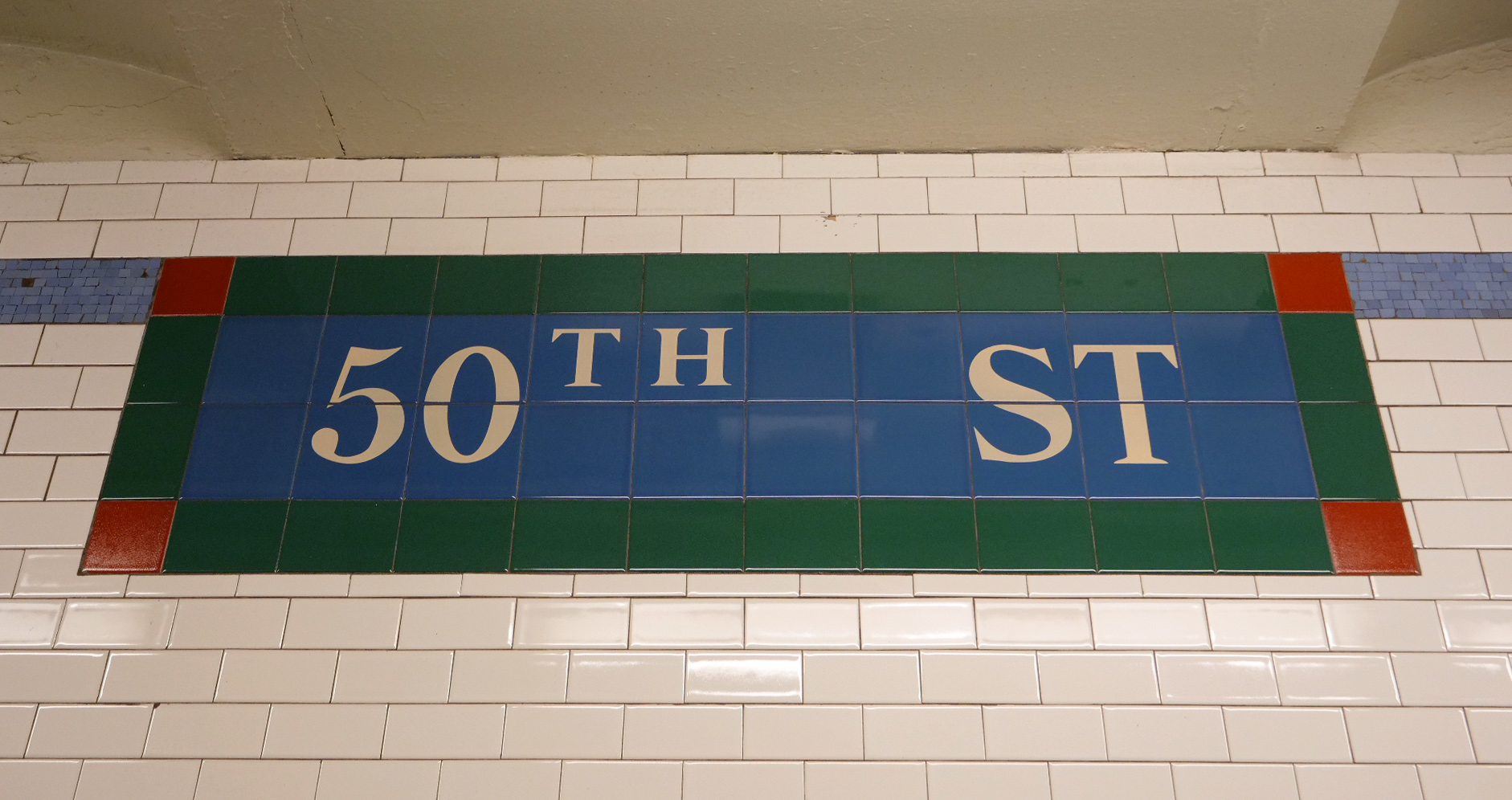
New mosaic replacing the original name plaque

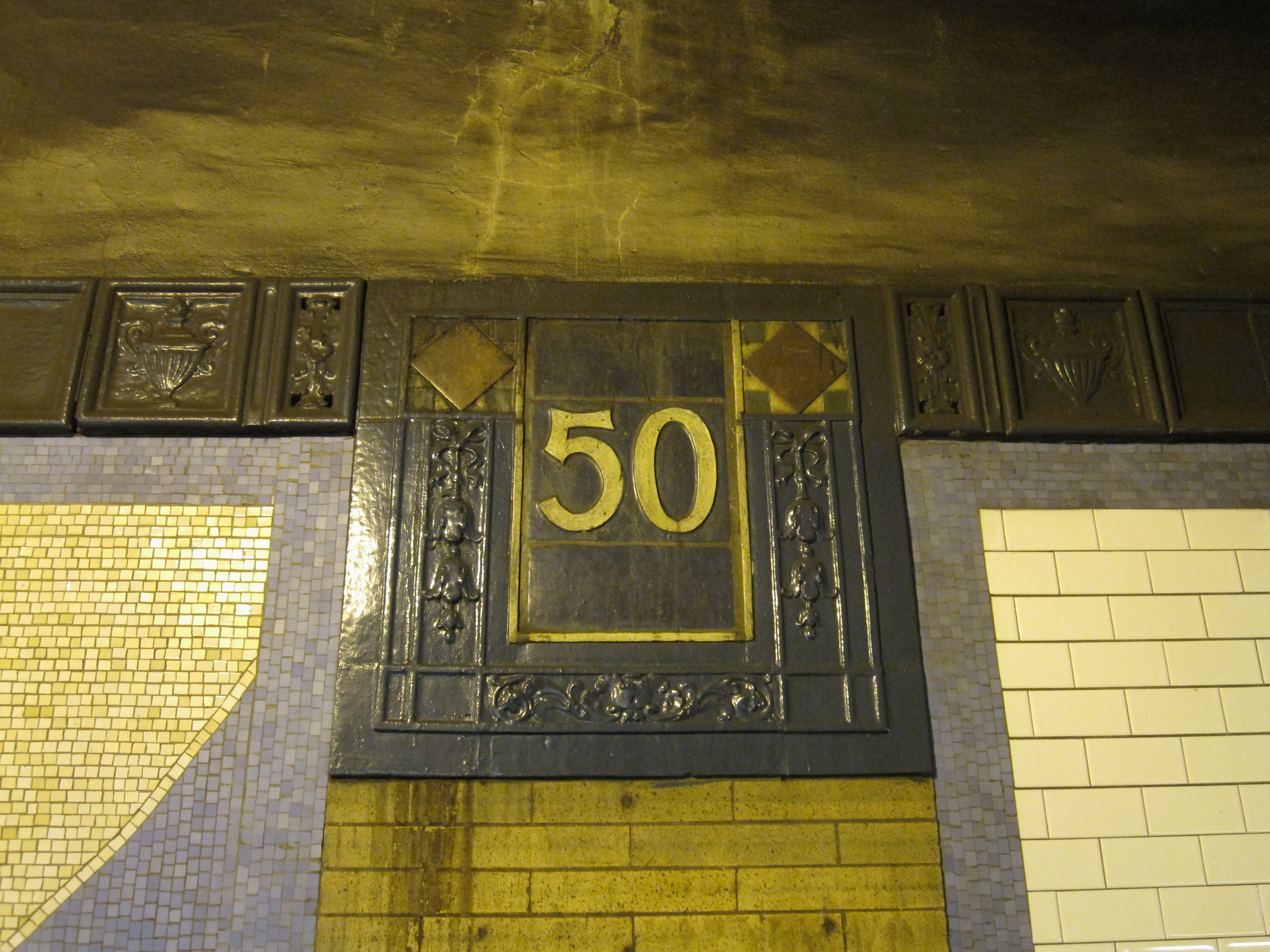
Original Faience plaque

=== Construction and opening ===
Planning for a subway line in New York City dates to 1864, but development of what became the city's first subway line did not start until 1894, when the New York State Legislature passed the Rapid Transit Act. The subway plans were drawn up by a team of engineers led by William Barclay Parsons, the Rapid Transit Commission's chief engineer. It called for a subway line from New York City Hall in lower Manhattan to the Upper West Side, where two branches would lead north into the Bronx. A plan was formally adopted in 1897, and all legal conflicts over the route alignment were resolved near the end of 1899.

The Rapid Transit Construction Company, organized by John B. McDonald and funded by August Belmont Jr., signed the initial Contract 1 with the Rapid Transit Commission in February 1900, under which it would construct the subway and maintain a 50-year operating lease from the opening of the line. In 1901, the firm of Heins & LaFarge was hired to design the underground stations. Belmont incorporated the Interborough Rapid Transit Company (IRT) in April 1902 to operate the subway.

The 50th Street station was constructed as part of the IRT's West Side Line (now the Broadway–Seventh Avenue Line) from 47th Street to 60th Street, for which work had begun on September 19, 1900. Work for that section had been awarded to Naughton & Company. By late 1903, the subway was nearly complete, but the IRT Powerhouse and the system's electrical substations were still under construction, delaying the system's opening. The 50th Street station opened on October 27, 1904, as one of the original 28 stations of the New York City Subway from City Hall to 145th Street on the West Side Branch.

=== Service changes and station renovations ===
After the first subway line was completed in 1908, the station was served by local trains along both the West Side (now the Broadway–Seventh Avenue Line to Van Cortlandt Park–242nd Street) and East Side (now the Lenox Avenue Line). West Side local trains had their southern terminus at City Hall during rush hours and South Ferry at other times, and had their northern terminus at 242nd Street. East Side local trains ran from City Hall to Lenox Avenue (145th Street).

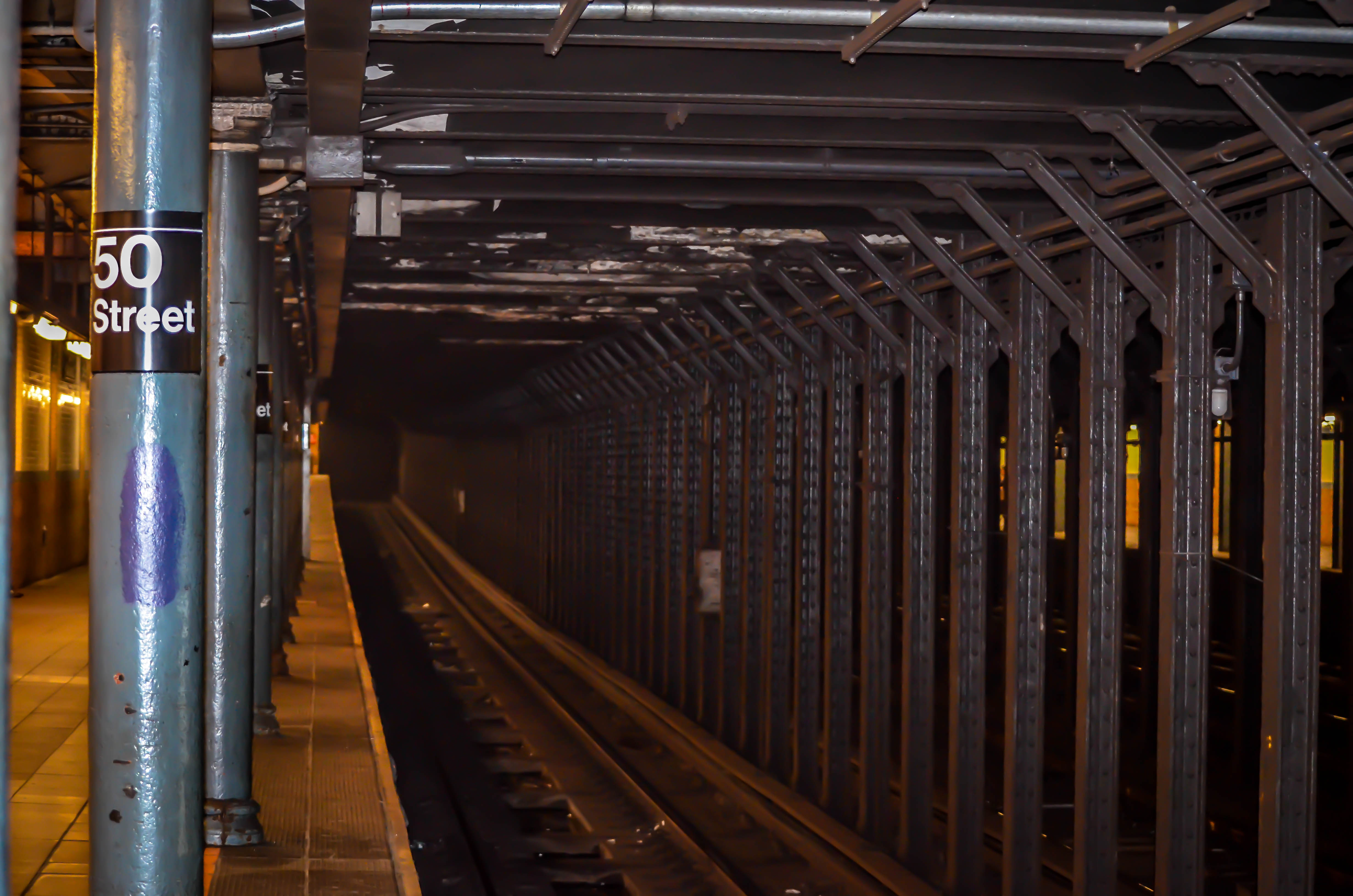
View of station columns

To address overcrowding, in 1909, the New York Public Service Commission proposed lengthening the platforms at stations along the original IRT subway. As part of a modification to the IRT's construction contracts made on January 18, 1910, the company was to lengthen station platforms to accommodate ten-car express and six-car local trains. In addition to $1.5 million (equivalent to $51.8 million in 2025) spent on platform lengthening, $500,000 (equivalent to $17.3 million in 2025) was spent on building additional entrances and exits. It was anticipated that these improvements would increase capacity by 25 percent. Platforms at local stations, such as the 50th Street station, were lengthened by between 20 and 30 feet (6.1 and 9.1 m). Both platforms were extended to the north and south. Six-car local trains began operating in October 1910. The Broadway–Seventh Avenue Line opened south of Times Square–42nd Street in 1918, and the original line was divided into an H-shaped system. The original subway north of Times Square thus became part of the Broadway–Seventh Avenue Line, and all local trains were sent to South Ferry.

In December 1922, the Transit Commission approved a $3 million project to lengthen platforms at 14 local stations along the original IRT line, including 50th Street and five other stations on the Broadway–Seventh Avenue Line. Platform lengths at these stations would be increased from 225 to 436 feet (69 to 133 m). The commission postponed the platform-lengthening project in September 1923, at which point the cost had risen to $5.6 million.

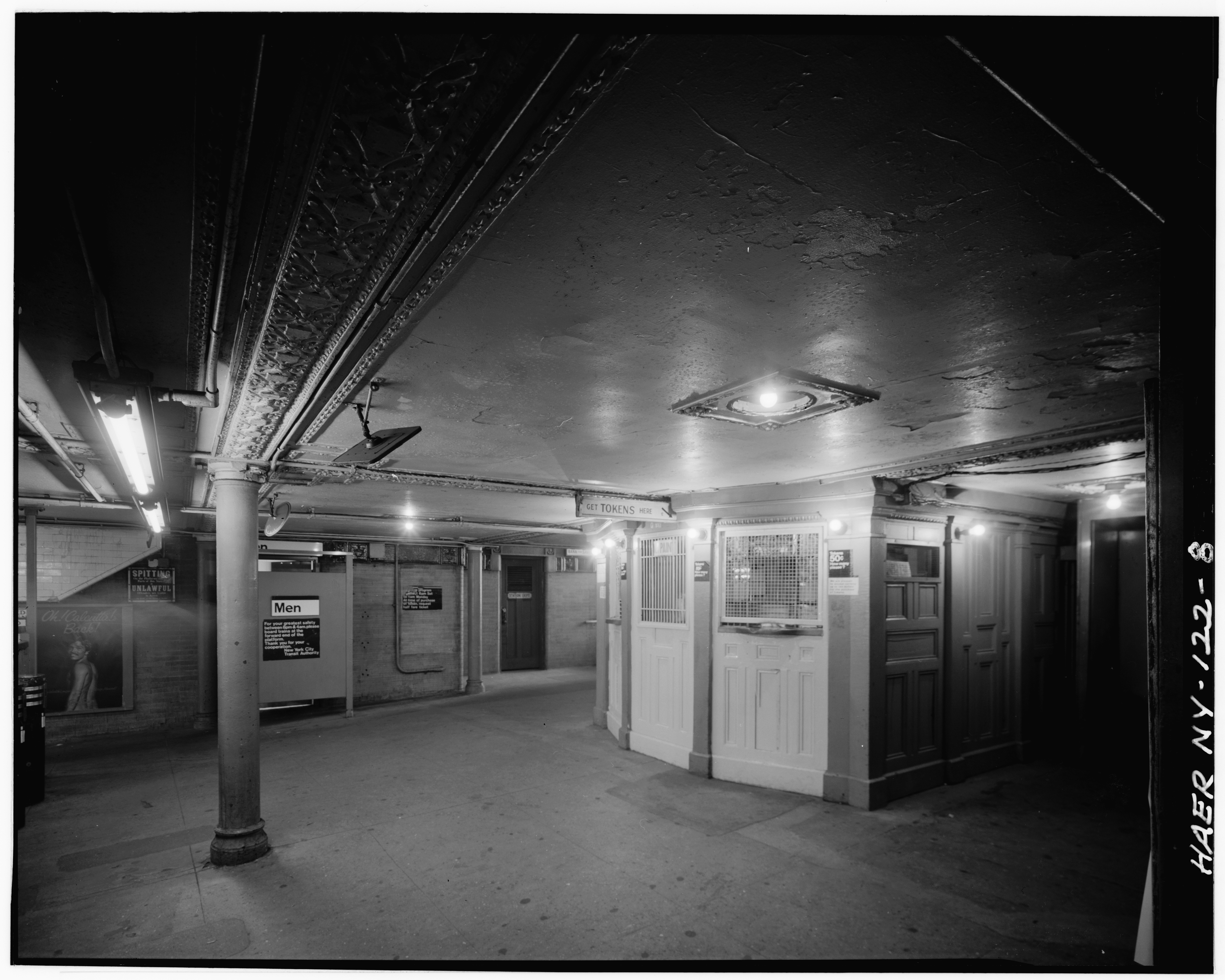
Old view of the station with its original ticket booth

The city government took over the IRT's operations on June 12, 1940. The IRT routes were given numbered designations in 1948 with the introduction of "R-type" rolling stock, which contained rollsigns with numbered designations for each service. The Broadway route to 242nd Street became known as the 1 and the Lenox Avenue route as the 3.

The original IRT stations north of Times Square could barely fit local trains of five or six cars depending on the configuration of the trains. Stations on the line from 50th Street to 96th Street, excluding the 91st Street station, had their platforms extended in the 1950s to accommodate ten-car trains as part of a $100 million rebuilding program (equivalent to $1,146.3 million in 2025) (equivalent to $1,146.3 million in 2025). The joint venture of Rosoff Bros Inc. and Joseph Meltzer Associates Inc. received a contract to remodel the 50th Street, 59th Street, and 66th Street stations in February 1957. The platform extensions at the local stations were completed by early 1958. Once the project was completed, all 1 trains became local and all 2 and 3 trains became express, and eight-car local trains began operation. Increased and lengthened service was implemented during peak hours on the 1 train on February 6, 1959. Due to the lengthening of the platforms at 86th Street and 96th Street, the intermediate 91st Street station was closed on February 2, 1959, because it was too close to the other two stations.

In 1981, the Metropolitan Transportation Authority listed the station among the 69 most deteriorated stations in the subway system. On September 4, 1987, Alex Cumba fell onto the tracks of the 50th Street station. Bystanders Edwin Ortiz, Jeff Kuhn, and Melvin Shadd jumped onto the tracks and attempted to lift Cumba back onto the platform, which was difficult due to Cumba's weight. The three were able to remove Cumba seconds before the train arrived. A recreation of the story aired on Rescue 911 on September 17, 1991.

In April 1988, the New York City Transit Authority (NYCTA) unveiled plans to speed up service on the Broadway–Seventh Avenue Line through the implementation of a skip-stop service: the 9 train. When skip-stop service started in 1989, it was only implemented north of 137th Street–City College on weekdays, and 50th Street was served by both the 1 and the 9. Skip-stop service ended on May 27, 2005, as a result of a decrease in the number of riders who benefited.

In early 2024, a pizzeria opened next to the station's southbound platform, adjacent to an existing coffee shop and cocktail bar. In 2026, as part of the Zoning for Accessibility program, private developer Extell Development received permission to finance the installation of elevators to both platforms at the 50th Street station, in exchange for being allowed to increase the size of a tower it was constructing nearby. As part of this project, a new entrance would be built to the northbound platform at 52nd Street.

== Station layout ==
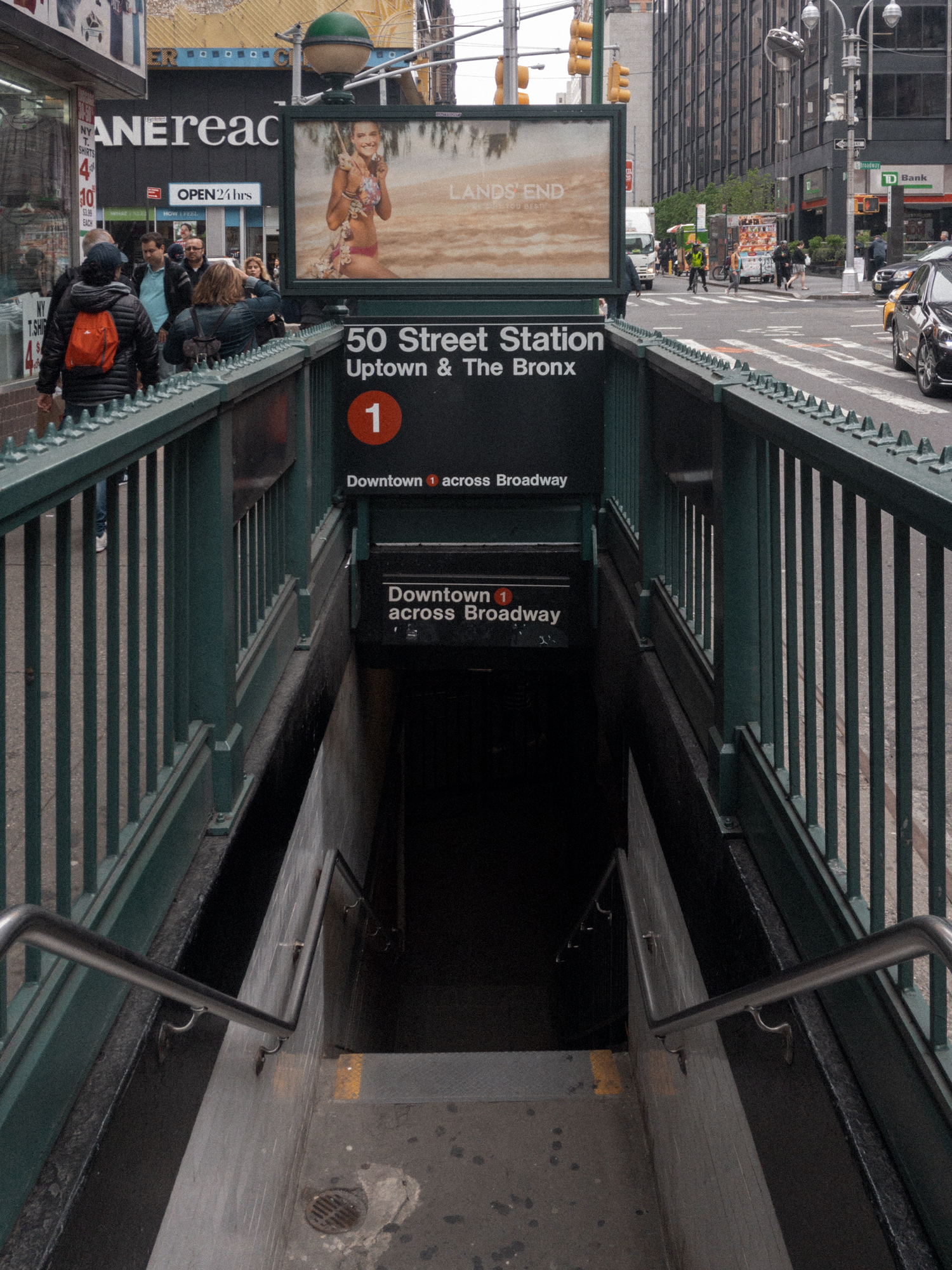
Entrance to uptown platform

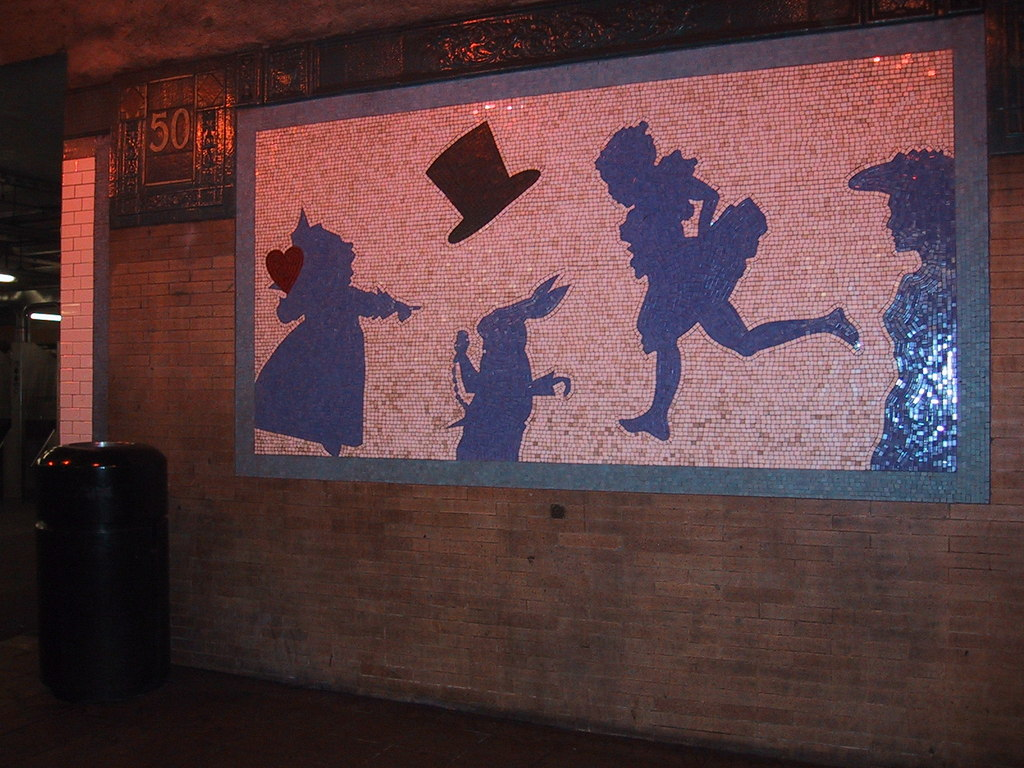
Liliana Porter's mosaic

Like other local stations, 50th Street has four tracks and two side platforms. The station is served by the 1 at all times and by the 2 during late nights; the center express tracks are used by the 2 train during daytime hours and the 3 train at all times. The station is between 59th Street–Columbus Circle to the north and Times Square–42nd Street to the south. The platforms were originally 200 feet (61 m) long, like at other local stations on the original IRT, but as a result of the 1958–1959 platform extension, became 520 feet (160 m) long.

=== Design ===
As with other stations built as part of the original IRT, each platform consists of 3-inch-thick (7.6 cm) concrete slabs, beneath which are drainage basins. The original platforms contain circular, cast-iron Doric-style columns spaced every 15 feet (4.6 m), while the platform extensions contain I-beam columns. Additional columns between the tracks, placed atop the transverse arches, support the jack-arched concrete station roofs.

The decorative scheme consists of green faience station-name tablets, blue tile bands, a green cornice, and blue plaques. The mosaic tiles at all original IRT stations were manufactured by the American Encaustic Tile Company, which subcontracted the installations at each station. The decorative work was performed by tile contractor Manhattan Glass Tile Company and faience contractor Grueby Faience Company. The ceilings of the original platforms and fare control areas contain plaster molding. Most of the original tile plaques at this station were removed during remodeling, replaced by much simpler blue, green, and red mosaics with printed letters. One of the original tile plaques has been preserved by the New York Transit Museum.

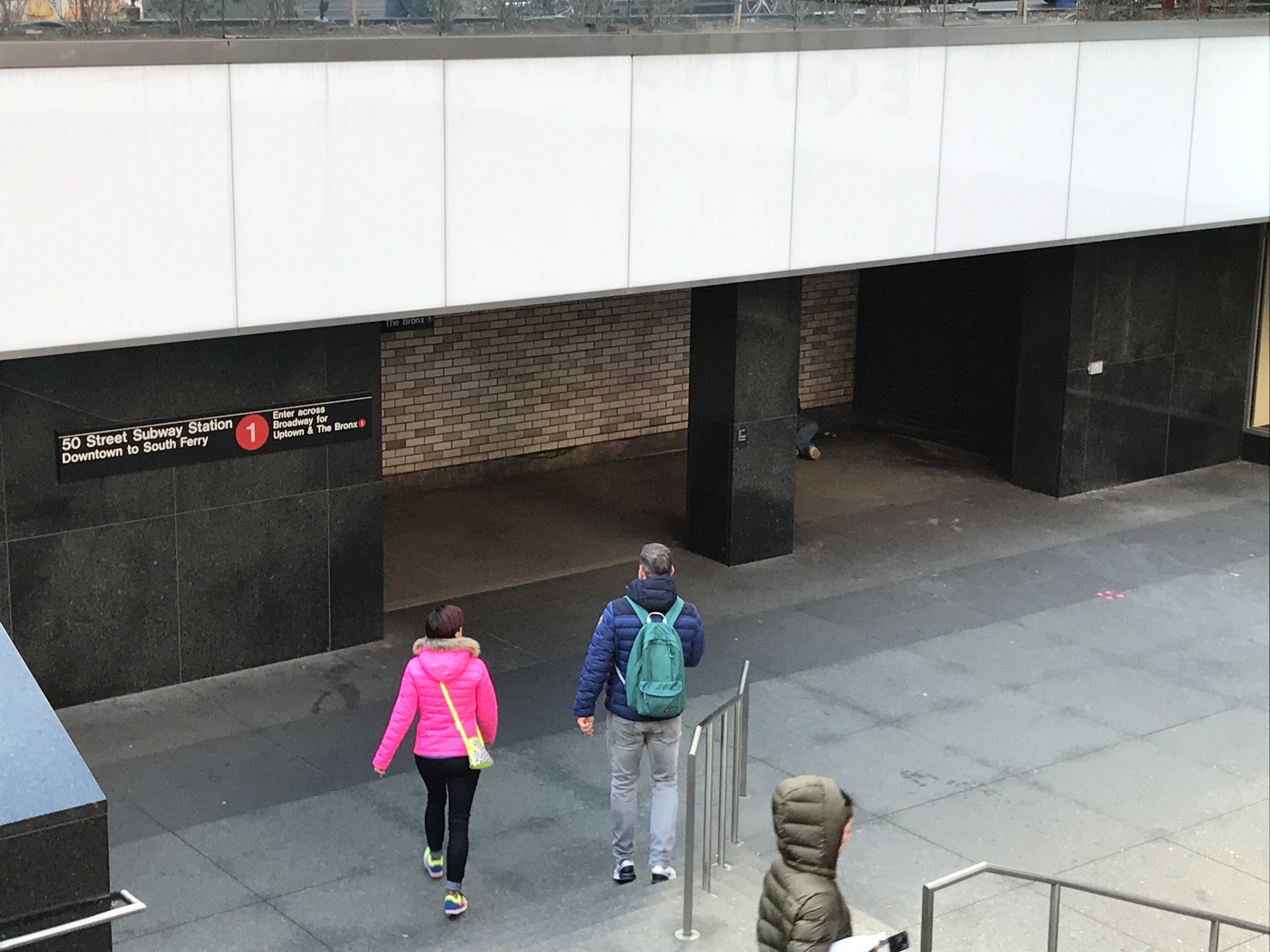
Entrance to the southbound platform

The station contains Liliana Porter's artwork Alice, The Way Out, a series of mosaics installed in 1994 as part of the MTA Arts & Design program. The mosaics depict characters from Lewis Carroll's novel Alice in Wonderland. The mosaics are a reference to the station's location in Manhattan's Theater District. According to former MTA Arts & Design director Sandra Bloodworth, "You see Alice pulling the curtain back in one of the images, and you have the theaters above ground."

=== Exits ===
Each platform has same-level fare control at the center and there are no crossovers or crossunders to allow free transfer between directions. Each fare control area has a token booth, turnstile bank, and newsstand. The northbound has four staircases to the streets: two to the northeast corner of 50th Street and Broadway, one to the southeast corner, and one inside a building on the south side of 50th Street midblock between Broadway and Seventh Avenue.

The southbound platform has an exit to an underground shopping arcade on the south side of 50th Street west of Broadway, where the "Nothing Really Matters" bar opened in 2022. Another exit goes to the southern sunken courtyard of Paramount Plaza on the northwest corner of 50th Street and Broadway.
