= 9 (New York City Subway service) =

Former New York City Subway service

- Seventh Avenue Local

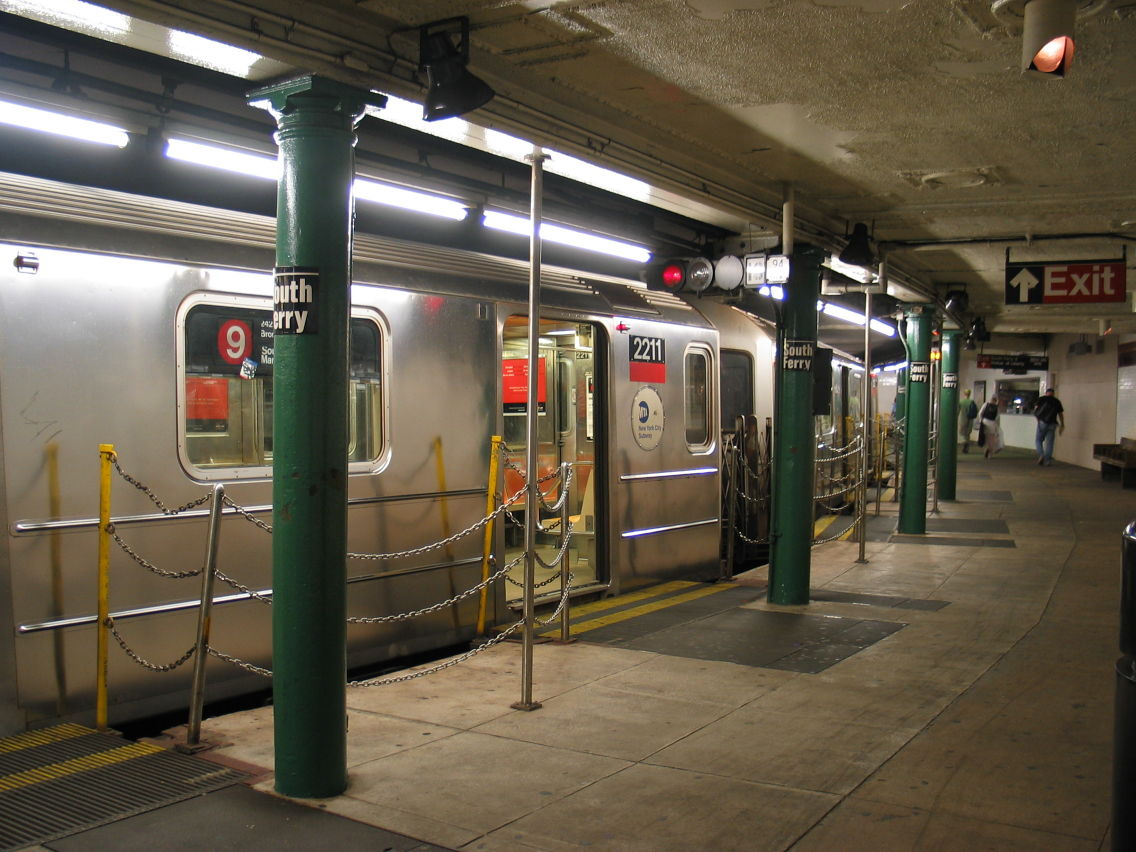
- A 9 train of R62A cars at South Ferry in 2004

- Northern end: Van Cortlandt Park–242nd Street
- Southern end: South Ferry
- Stations: 33
- Depot: 240th Street Yard
- Started service: August 21, 1989; 36 years ago
- Discontinued: May 27, 2005; 21 years ago

The 9 Broadway-Seventh Avenue Local was a rapid transit service in the A Division of the New York City Subway. Its route emblem, or "bullet", was colored red, the color used by trains on the Interborough Rapid Transit Company's (IRT) Broadway–Seventh Avenue Line.

The 9 operated during rush hour periods from 1989 to 2005, as a variant of the 1, providing service between Van Cortlandt Park–242nd Street in Riverdale, Bronx, and South Ferry in Lower Manhattan. The 1 ran in a skip-stop service pattern during rush hours, with the 9 providing the complementary skip-stop service on the same route. The 9 was temporarily suspended between 2001 and 2002 due to severe damage to the Broadway–Seventh Avenue Line caused by the September 11 attacks, and was permanently discontinued in 2005 as a result of a decrease in the number of riders benefiting.

The 9 designation was also used for a shuttle train on the IRT Dyre Avenue Line between 1941 and 1967.

== History ==
=== Dyre Avenue Line (1941–1967) ===
The 9 designation was originally used for the Interborough Rapid Transit Company's (IRT) Dyre Avenue Line. It served the former New York, Westchester and Boston Railway between Dyre Avenue and East 180th Street, connecting to the IRT White Plains Road Line at the latter station. When the connection between the Dyre Avenue Line and the White Plains Road Line opened in 1957, daytime shuttle service was replaced with through service as the 2. From 1957 until 1967, the nighttime Dyre Avenue Shuttle continued to use the number 9. The shuttle was relabeled SS in 1967, and then renamed as part of the 5, the same as the through service on the line through East 180th Street to Dyre Avenue.

=== Broadway–Seventh Avenue Line (1989–2005) ===
In April 1988, the New York City Transit Authority (NYCTA) unveiled plans to speed up service on the Broadway–Seventh Avenue Line through the implementation of skip-stop service. As soon as the plan was announced, some local officials were opposed to the change. Initially, skip-stop service would have been operated north of 116th Street, with 1 trains skipping 125th Street, 157th Street, 207th Street, and 225th Street, and 9 trains skipping 145th Street, 181st Street, Dyckman Street, 215th Street and 238th Street. As part of the study that resulted in the skip-stop plan, the NYCTA examined the feasibility of using the center track for express service. However, the center track along the Broadway–Seventh Avenue Line exists in two segments, (Note: The segments of the IRT Broadway–Seventh Avenue Line between 103rd to 145th Streets and 207th to 238th Streets contain three tracks, including a center track considered for express service. Neither segment has any express stations, with platforms for the center track. The segment between 157th and Dyckman Streets only contains two tracks.) which would result in an inefficient express service, and so skip-stop service was chosen instead. Most passengers would not have to wait longer for a train because, previously, a third of 1 trains had terminated at 137th Street. The previous headway for stations north of there was 10 minutes. At skip-stop stations, the maximum wait was to be 10 minutes, and would be 5 minutes at all-stop stations. Skip-stop trains would not speed through stations, instead passing through skipped stops at 15 mph (24 km/h), the maximum allowed per NYCTA rules.

In July 1988, it was announced that 1/9 skip-stop service would begin on August 29, 1988. Skip-stop service was expected to speed up travel times for almost half of riders north of 96th Street. In August 1988, the NYCTA postponed plans for 1/9 skip-stop service due to public opposition. NYCTA officials recognized that they did not do a good job informing the community, and indicated that they planned to continue to look into it. Plans to implement skip-stop service on the IRT Pelham Line (6 train), which were contingent on the success of 1/9 skip-stop were indefinitely postponed. In September 1988, the MTA Board formally voted to defer implementation of 1/9 skip-stop service for these reasons. NYCTA planned to initiate outreach in January 1989 and implement the change at some point later that year. In October 1988, the NYCTA informed local communities that it planned to implement skip-stop the following spring; residents of Inwood and Washington Heights were particularly opposed to the change.

In March 1989, the NYCTA stated that there was not a set date for the implementation of the plan, with service possibly starting as late as the fall. To convince local communities, it set up meetings with residents and distributed leaflets advertising the change. In an attempt to win their favor, they changed the name of the service from "skip-stop" to "express" service.

A public hearing on the NYCTA's plan for skip-stop service was held on June 27, 1989. The goals of skip-stop service were to extend all trips to 242nd Street, to provide faster travel times for a majority of riders, and to improve service reliability through evenly loaded and spaced trains. During 1987 and 1988 analysis was conducted to determine various options for express service along the 1, including using the center express track. As part of the plan, express service was to operate weekdays between 6:30 a.m. and 7 p.m. Trips that ended at 137th Street were extended to 242nd Street, which eliminated the need for a significant reduction in service levels at local stops. The 125th Street station, which is located south of 137th Street, would have experienced a reduction in service. The location of all-stop stations and skip-stop stations was done to evenly distribute passengers between the 1 and the 9, and to accommodate reverse commuting patterns. Stops with ridership greater than 8,000 daily passengers were designated all-stop stations, while less patronized stops were served by either 1 or 9 trains. One change was made from the 1988 plan–due to community input 181st Street was added as an all-stop station. Express service was expected to save up to 2 1/2 minutes of travel time, with an additional 2 1/2-minute reduction in waiting time at all-stop stations. This would save a minimum of six minutes, and a maximum of nine minutes or a 19% travel time reduction. Running express service via the center track was dismissed since it was not designed for express service. The track south of 145th Street is not long enough to allow an express train to pass a local, resulting in merging delays at 103rd Street which would eliminate any time saved. In addition, the busiest stops on the line north of 96th Street would be bypassed without any time savings. Extending all-local service to 242nd Street or adding additional trains were dismissed since they would require additional subway cars, which were not available at the time.

On July 28, 1989, the MTA Board approved a revised 1/9 skip-stop plan unanimously, with the plan scheduled to take effect on August 21, 1989. Unlike the original plan, 1 trains would skip 145th Street, 191st Street, 207th Street and 225th Street, while 9 trains would skip 157th Street, Dyckman Street, 215th Street and 238th Street.

Beginning at 6:30 a.m. on August 21, 1989, the services were coordinated as the 1/9 and both ran between Van Cortlandt Park–242nd Street and South Ferry. The plan was to have skip-stop service begin north of 116th Street–Columbia University, but due to objections, most notably that riders did not want 125th Street to be a skip-stop station, skip-stop service was only implemented north of 137th Street–City College between the hours of 6:30 am and 7:00 pm weekdays.

On September 4, 1994, midday skip-stop service was discontinued, and 191st Street was no longer a skip-stop station. By this time, skip-stop service assigned the following stations to the 1 train only:

- 238th Street
- 215th Street
- Dyckman Street
- 157th Street

and the following stations to the 9 train only:

- Marble Hill–225th Street
- 207th Street
- 145th Street

After the September 11, 2001 attacks, 1 trains had to be rerouted since the IRT Broadway–Seventh Avenue Line ran directly under the World Trade Center site and was heavily damaged in the collapse of the Twin Towers. The 1 ran only between Van Cortlandt Park–242nd Street and 14th Street, running local north of 96th Street and express south of there. It later ran to New Lots Avenue via the IRT Eastern Parkway Line, running local on that line, as well as south of 96th Street, replacing the 3 train, which ran between Harlem–148th Street and 14th Street; the 9 service and skip-stop service were suspended at this time. 1 trains returned to South Ferry, and skip-stop service was restored on September 15, 2002.

On April 27, 2004, it was announced that New York City Transit was considering eliminating 9 and skip-stop service due to long wait times, and as a result of a decrease in the number of riders benefiting. The MTA estimated that eliminating skip-stop service only added 2 1/2 to 3 minutes of travel time for passengers at the northernmost stations at 242nd Street and 238th Street, while many passengers would see trains frequencies double, resulting in decreased overall travel time because of less time waiting for trains. It planned on making a decision in the summer, and approved the change on January 11, 2005. The 9 train was discontinued on May 27, 2005, and the 1 now makes all stops on the IRT Broadway–Seventh Avenue Line.

== Final route ==
=== Service pattern ===
The 9 service used the following lines during the rush hours only.

Line	From	To	Tracks
IRT Broadway–Seventh Avenue Line	Van Cortlandt Park–242nd Street	South Ferry	local

=== Stations ===
Stations in green and stations in blue denote stops served by the 1 and former 9, respectively, during rush hours. At all other times, the 1 ran local and now runs local at all times.

Station service legend
Stops all times	Stops 24 hours a day
Stops all times except late nights	Stops every day during daytime hours only
Stops late nights only	Stops every day during overnight hours only
Stops weekdays during the day	Stops during weekday daytime hours only
Stops all times except rush hours in the peak direction	Stops 24 hours a day, except during weekday rush hours in the peak direction
Stops rush hours only	Stops during weekday rush hours only
Stops rush hours in the peak direction only	Stops weekdays in the peak direction only
Station closed	Station closed
Time period details
Disabled access	Station is compliant with the Americans with Disabilities Act
↑	Station is compliant with the Americans with Disabilities Act in the indicated direction only
↓	Station is compliant with the Americans with Disabilities Act in the indicated direction only
	Elevator access to mezzanine only

1 service	9 service	Stations	Disabled access	Subway transfers	Connections and notes
The Bronx
Stops all times	Stops rush hours only	Van Cortlandt Park–242nd Street		1	
Stops all times		238th Street		1	
Stops all times	Stops rush hours only	231st Street	Disabled access	1	
Manhattan
Stops all times except rush hours in the peak direction	Stops rush hours only	Marble Hill–225th Street		1	Metro-North Hudson Line at Marble Hill
Stops all times		215th Street		1	
Stops all times except rush hours in the peak direction	Stops rush hours only	207th Street		1	
Stops all times		Dyckman Street		1	
Stops all times	Stops rush hours only	191st Street		1	
Stops all times	Stops rush hours only	181st Street		1	George Washington Bridge Bus Terminal
Stops all times	Stops rush hours only	168th Street		1 A C (IND Eighth Avenue Line)	
Stops all times		157th Street		1	
Stops all times except rush hours in the peak direction	Stops rush hours only	145th Street		1	
Stops all times	Stops rush hours only	137th Street–City College		1	
Stops all times	Stops rush hours only	125th Street		1	
Stops all times	Stops rush hours only	116th Street–Columbia University		1	M60 bus to LaGuardia Airport
Stops all times	Stops rush hours only	Cathedral Parkway–110th Street		1	M60 bus to LaGuardia Airport
Stops all times	Stops rush hours only	103rd Street		1	
Stops all times	Stops rush hours only	96th Street		1 2 3	
Stops all times	Stops rush hours only	86th Street		1	
Stops all times	Stops rush hours only	79th Street		1	
Stops all times	Stops rush hours only	72nd Street	Disabled access	1 2 3	
Stops all times	Stops rush hours only	66th Street–Lincoln Center	Disabled access	1	
Stops all times	Stops rush hours only	59th Street–Columbus Circle	Disabled access	1 A B C D (IND Eighth Avenue Line)	
Stops all times	Stops rush hours only	50th Street		1	
Stops all times	Stops rush hours only	Times Square–42nd Street	Disabled access	1 2 3; 7 <7> (IRT Flushing Line); A C E (IND Eighth Avenue Line at 42nd Street–Port Authority Bus Terminal); N Q R W (BMT Broadway Line); S (42nd Street Shuttle)	Port Authority Bus Terminal
Stops all times	Stops rush hours only	34th Street–Penn Station	Disabled access	1 2 3	Amtrak, LIRR, and NJ Transit at Pennsylvania Station
Stops all times	Stops rush hours only	28th Street		1	
Stops all times	Stops rush hours only	23rd Street		1	
Stops all times	Stops rush hours only	18th Street		1	
Stops all times	Stops rush hours only	14th Street		1 2 3 F V (IND Sixth Avenue Line at 14th Street); L (BMT Canarsie Line at Sixth Avenue)	PATH at 14th Street (V service discontinued in 2010)
Stops all times	Stops rush hours only	Christopher Street–Sheridan Square		1	PATH at Christopher Street
Stops all times	Stops rush hours only	Houston Street		1	
Stops all times	Stops rush hours only	Canal Street		1	
Stops all times	Stops rush hours only	Franklin Street		1	
Stops all times	Stops rush hours only	Chambers Street		1 2 3	
Station closed	Station closed	Cortlandt Street			Closed since September 11, 2001 (reopened in 2018 as WTC Cortlandt)
Stops all times	Stops rush hours only	Rector Street		1	
Stops all times	Stops rush hours only	South Ferry		1	Staten Island Ferry at Whitehall Terminal (closed in 2009)
