= 91st Street station (IRT Broadway–Seventh Avenue Line) =

New York City Subway station in Manhattan (closed 1959)

91 Street
- Former New York City Subway station
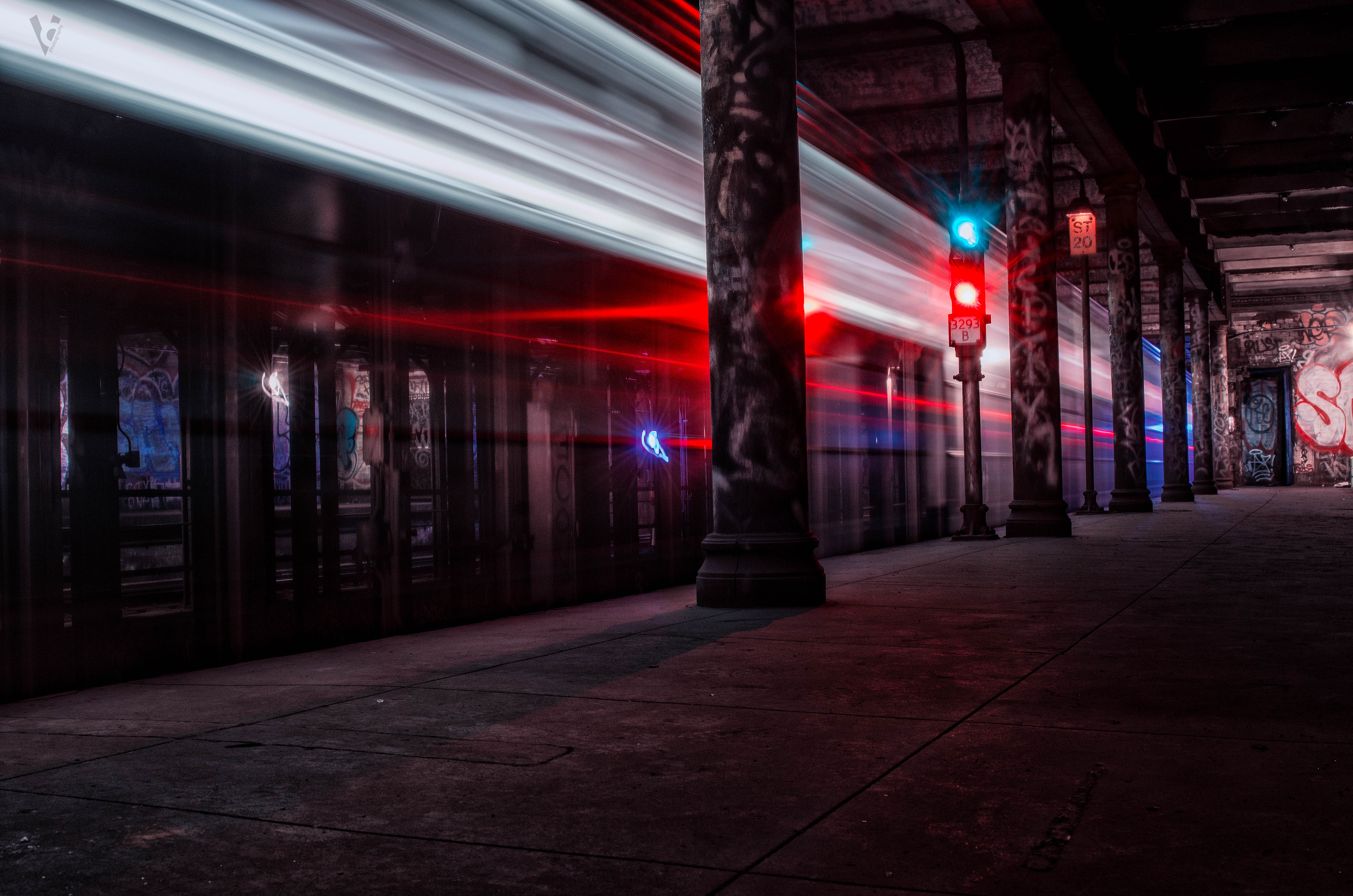
- The abandoned station platform in 2016

Station statistics
- Address: West 91st Street and Broadway; New York, NY 10025
- Borough: Manhattan
- Locale: Upper West Side
- Coordinates: 40.7914°N 73.9741°W
- Division: A (IRT)
- Line: IRT Broadway–Seventh Avenue Line
- Services: None (abandoned)
- Structure: Underground
- Platforms: 2 side platforms
- Tracks: 4

Other information
- Opened: October 27, 1904; 122 years ago
- Closed: February 2, 1959; 67 years ago

Station succession
- Next north: 96th Street
- Next south: 86th Street
Location
Location within New York City Subway
Location within New York City
Location within New York
Track layout
Street map

The 91st Street station is a ghost station that originally served local trains on the IRT Broadway–Seventh Avenue Line of the New York City Subway. It is located at 91st Street and Broadway on the Upper West Side of Manhattan.

The 91st Street station was constructed for the Interborough Rapid Transit Company (IRT) as part of the city's first subway line, which was approved in 1900. Construction of the line segment that includes the 91st Street station began on August 22 of the same year. The station opened on October 27, 1904, as one of the original 28 stations of the New York City Subway. The station was closed on February 2, 1959, as a result of a platform lengthening project at the two adjacent stations, 86th Street and 96th Street.

The 91st Street station contains two abandoned side platforms and four tracks. The station was built with tile and mosaic decorations. Many of these decorations have been covered with graffiti.

== History ==
=== Construction and opening ===
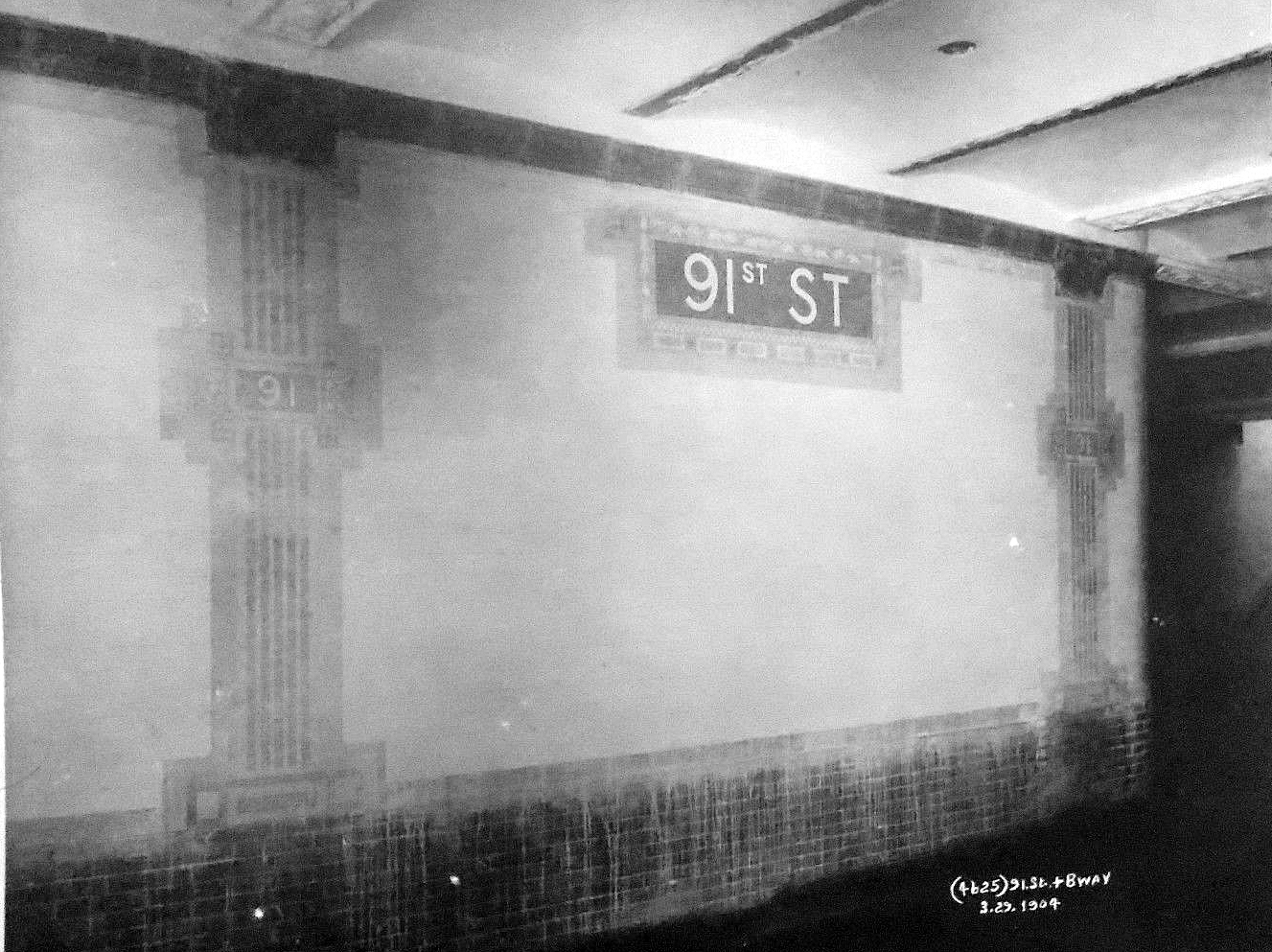
The 91st Street station prior to opening in 1904

Planning for a subway line in New York City dates to 1864, but development of what became the city's first subway line did not start until 1894, when the New York State Legislature passed the Rapid Transit Act. The subway plans were drawn up by a team of engineers led by William Barclay Parsons, the Rapid Transit Commission's chief engineer. It called for a subway line from New York City Hall in lower Manhattan to the Upper West Side, where two branches would lead north into the Bronx. A plan was formally adopted in 1897, and all legal conflicts over the route alignment were resolved near the end of 1899. The Rapid Transit Construction Company, organized by John B. McDonald and funded by August Belmont Jr., signed the initial Contract 1 with the Rapid Transit Commission in February 1900, under which it would construct the subway and maintain a 50-year operating lease from the opening of the line. In 1901, the firm of Heins & LaFarge was hired to design the underground stations. Belmont incorporated the Interborough Rapid Transit Company (IRT) in April 1902 to operate the subway.

The 91st Street station was constructed as part of the IRT's West Side Line (now the Broadway–Seventh Avenue Line) from 82nd Street to 104th Street, for which work had begun on August 22, 1900. Work for that section had been awarded to William Bradley. By late 1903, the subway was nearly complete, but the IRT Powerhouse and the system's electrical substations were still under construction, delaying the system's opening. The 91st Street station opened on October 27, 1904, as one of the original 28 stations of the New York City Subway from City Hall to 145th Street on the West Side Branch.

=== Service changes and closure ===
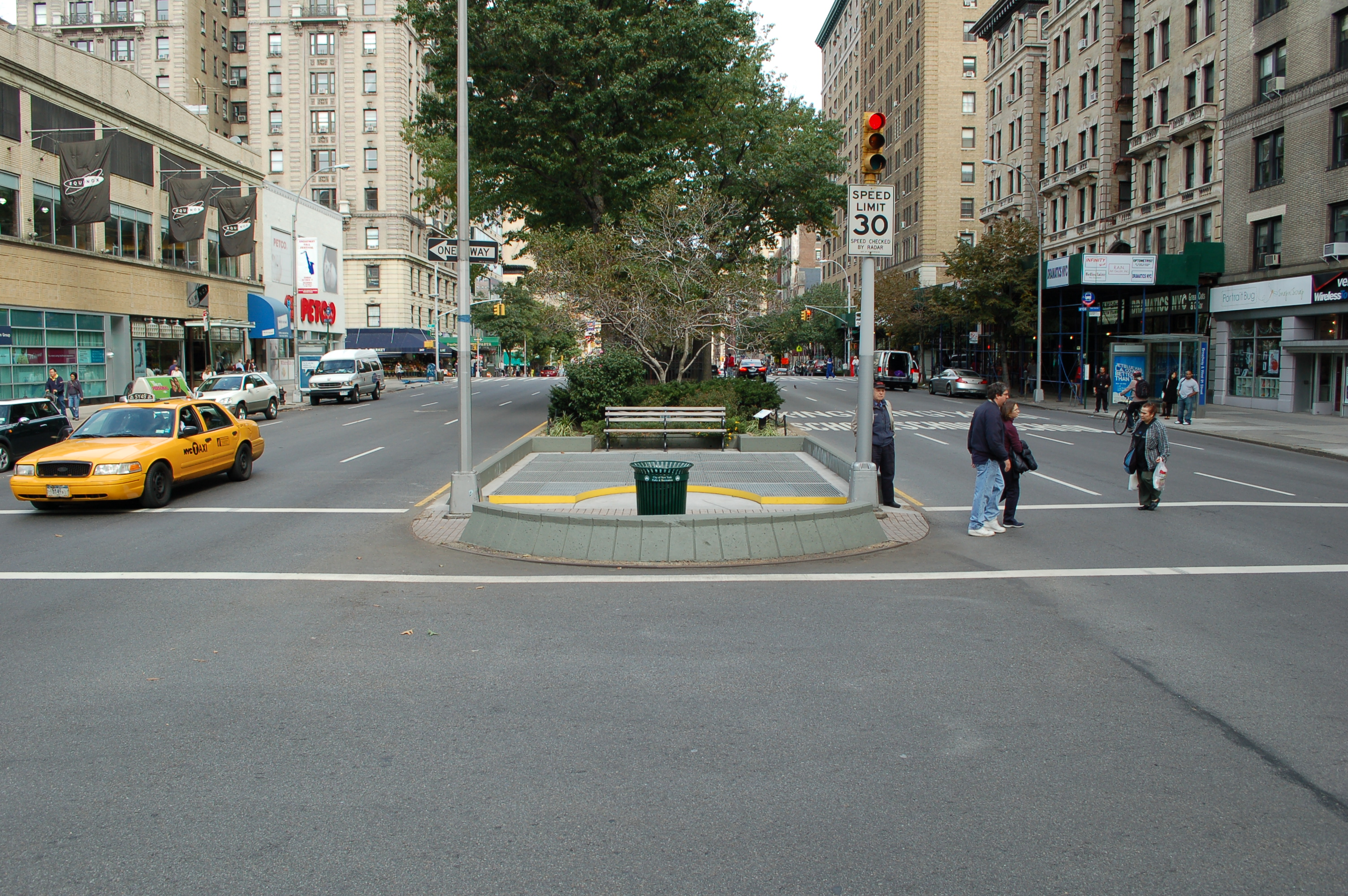
Street grading of 91st Street

After the first subway line was completed in 1908, the station was served by local trains along both the West Side (now the Broadway–Seventh Avenue Line to Van Cortlandt Park–242nd Street) and East Side (now the Lenox Avenue Line). West Side local trains had their southern terminus at City Hall during rush hours and South Ferry at other times, and had their northern terminus at 242nd Street. East Side local trains ran from City Hall to Lenox Avenue (145th Street).

To address overcrowding, in 1909, the New York Public Service Commission proposed lengthening the platforms at stations along the original IRT subway. As part of a modification to the IRT's construction contracts made on January 18, 1910, the company was to lengthen station platforms to accommodate ten-car express and six-car local trains. In addition to $1.5 million (equivalent to $51.8 million in 2025) spent on platform lengthening, $500,000 (equivalent to $17.3 million in 2025) was spent on building additional entrances and exits. It was anticipated that these improvements would increase capacity by 25 percent. Platforms at local stations, such as the 91st Street station, were lengthened by between 20 and 30 feet (6.1 and 9.1 m). Both platforms were extended to the north and south. Six-car local trains began operating in October 1910. The Broadway–Seventh Avenue Line opened south of Times Square–42nd Street in 1918, and the original line was divided into an H-shaped system. The original subway north of Times Square thus became part of the Broadway–Seventh Avenue Line, and all local trains were sent to South Ferry.

In December 1922, the Transit Commission approved a $3 million project to lengthen platforms at 14 local stations along the original IRT line, including 91st Street and five other stations on the Broadway–Seventh Avenue Line. Platform lengths at these stations would be increased from 225 to 436 feet (69 to 133 m). The commission postponed the platform-lengthening project in September 1923, at which point the cost had risen to $5.6 million.

The city government took over the IRT's operations on June 12, 1940. The station's decline commenced in the late 1940s when platforms on the IRT Broadway–Seventh Avenue Line from 103rd Street to 238th Street were lengthened to 514 feet (157 m) to allow trains of ten 51.4-foot-long (15.7 m) cars to stop at these stations; previously, platforms could only accommodate six-car local trains. The platform extensions were opened in stages through 1948. The IRT routes were given numbered designations in 1948 with the introduction of "R-type" rolling stock, which contained rollsigns with numbered designations for each service. The Broadway route to 242nd Street became known as the 1 and the Lenox Avenue route as the 3.

A new service pattern was implemented on the line during peak hours in the late 1950s, removing a rush-hour service bottleneck north of 96th Street by rerouting local trains up the Broadway–Seventh Avenue Line to Van Cortlandt Park–242nd Street and express trains to the Bronx or 145th Street via the IRT Lenox Avenue Line. On February 6, 1959, all Broadway trains became locals, and all Lenox Avenue trains became expresses, eliminating the need to switch tracks. The rush-hour service could not be implemented until the platform extensions at stations on the line were completed. The original IRT stations north of Times Square could only fit five- or six-car trains. By 1958, the platform extensions at the local stations were nearly completed, but there were more problems with the platform extensions at the two express stations, 72nd Street and 96th Street. At 72nd Street, the track layout was simply changed, but at 96th Street, the local tracks and the outside walls had to be moved. A new mezzanine with stairways to the street was built between West 93rd Street and West 94th Street. The 86th Street and 96th Street stations had their platforms extended in order to accommodate 10-car trains. The 91st Street station could not have its platforms extended because they would already be too close to the other two stations. It was closed on February 2, 1959. Advertisements from 1959 persisted for several years before the station walls were graffitied over.

== Station layout ==
Like other local stations, 91st Street has four tracks and two abandoned side platforms. The two local tracks, which formerly served the station, are used by the 1 train at all times and the 2 train during late nights. The two express tracks are used by the 2 train during daytime hours and the 3 train at all times. The platforms were 200 feet (61 m) long, like at other local stations on the original IRT. While the local tracks stay level, the express tracks are at a lower elevation throughout most of the station.

As with other stations built as part of the original IRT, the station was constructed using a cut-and-cover method. The tunnel is covered by a U-shaped trough that contains utility pipes and wires. This trough contains a foundation of concrete no less than 4 inches (100 mm) thick. Each former platform consists of 3-inch-thick (7.6 cm) concrete slabs, beneath which are drainage basins. The former platforms contain circular, cast-iron Doric-style columns spaced every 15 feet (4.6 m). Additional columns between the tracks, spaced every 5 feet (1.5 m), support the jack-arched concrete station roofs. There is a 1-inch (25 mm) gap between the trough wall and the platform walls, which are made of 4-inch (100 mm)-thick brick covered over by a tiled finish.

The decorative scheme consisted of blue tile tablets, green tile bands, a yellow faience cornice, and violet faience plaques. The mosaic tiles at all original IRT stations were manufactured by the American Encaustic Tiling Company, which subcontracted the installations at each station. The decorative work was performed by tile contractor Alfred Boote Company and faience contractor Rookwood Pottery Company. The 91st Street station is fairly well preserved, with the exception of some litter and graffiti.

== See also ==
- Worth Street station
- 18th Street station (IRT Lexington Avenue Line)
