= Old Grapevine =

Former tavern in New York City

Coordinates: 40.73536°N 73.99832°W

The Old Grapevine was a tavern in the Greenwich Village neighborhood of New York City at the southeast corner of Sixth Avenue and 11th Street. The tavern was located in a three-story roadhouse built in the 18th century and was originally called the Hawthorne. It was later named after a grapevine that grew on one of its walls. It was a hangout for artists, actors, businessmen, lawyers, Confederate spies, and Union officers. The high concentration of Civil War Soldiers made it an ideal place to hear (or plant) military gossip, leading some to believe the idiom "heard it through the grapevine" originated here.

The nearby Jefferson Market Courthouse attracted many politicians including U.S. President Chester A. Arthur who visited the tavern many times. It was demolished in 1915.
