= List of numbered streets in Manhattan =

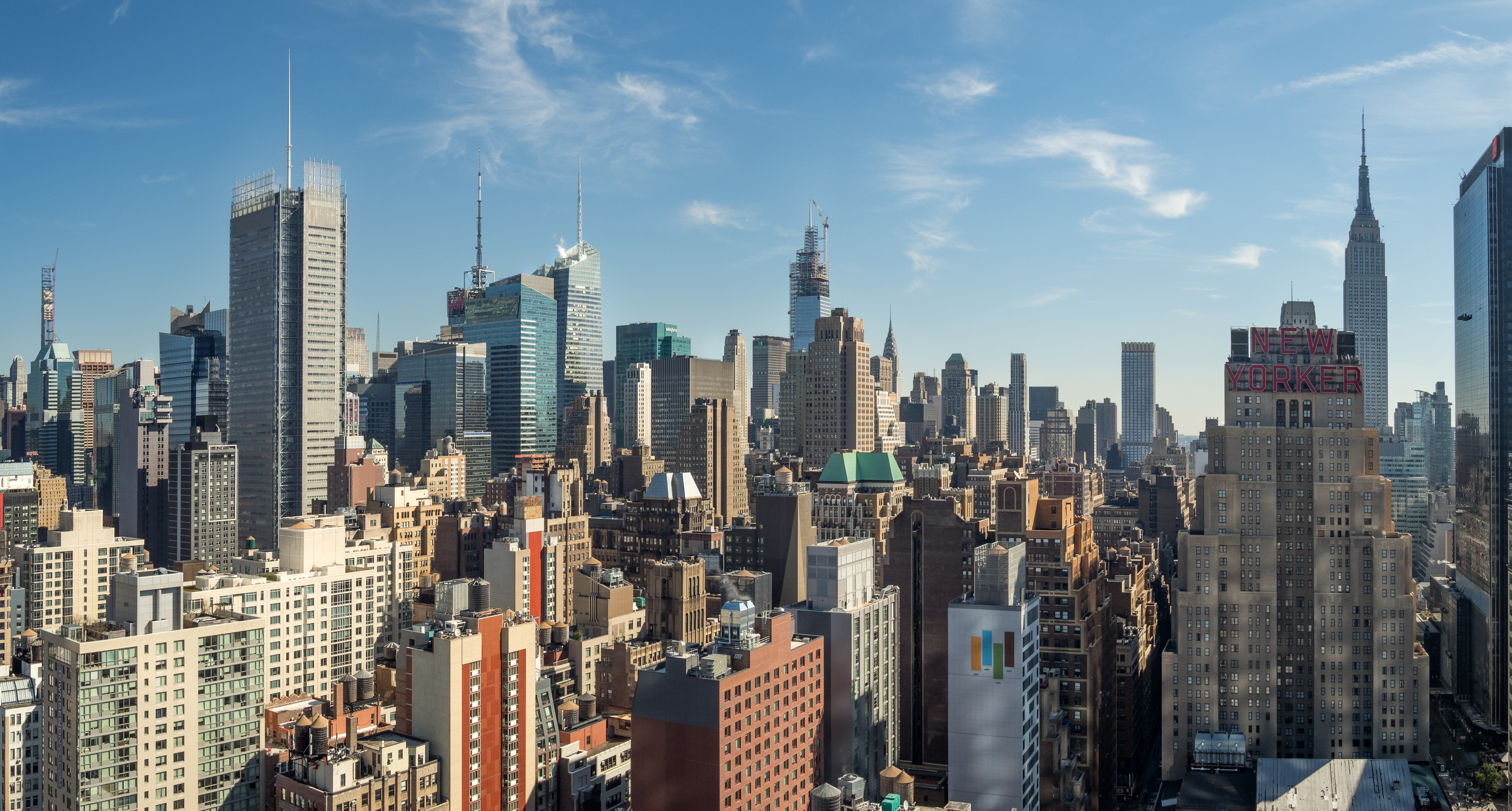
Midtown Manhattan in October 2019

The borough of Manhattan in New York City contains 214 numbered east–west streets ranging from 1st to 228th, the majority of them designated in the Commissioners' Plan of 1811. These streets do not run exactly east–west, because the grid plan is aligned with the Hudson River, rather than with the cardinal directions. Thus, the majority of the Manhattan grid's "west" is approximately 29 degrees north of true west; the angle differs above 155th Street, where the grid initially ended. The grid now covers the length of the island from 14th Street north.

All numbered streets carry an East or West prefix – for example, East 10th Street or West 10th Street – which is demarcated at Broadway below 8th Street, and at Fifth Avenue at 8th Street and above. The numbered streets carry crosstown traffic. In general, but with numerous exceptions, even-numbered streets are one-way eastbound and odd-numbered streets are one-way westbound. Most wider streets, and a few of the narrow ones, carry two-way traffic.

Although the numbered streets begin just north of East Houston Street in the East Village, they generally do not extend west into Greenwich Village, which already had established, named streets when the grid plan was laid out by the Commissioners' Plan of 1811. Some streets in that area that do continue farther west change direction before reaching the Hudson River.

The highest numbered street on Manhattan Island is 220th Street, but Marble Hill is also within the borough of Manhattan, so the highest street number in the borough is 228th Street. The numbering system continues in the Bronx, up to 263rd Street, though east of Van Cortlandt Park the system ends at 243rd Street. The lowest numbered street in Manhattan is East 1st Street, which runs through Alphabet City near East Houston Street. There are also three streets numbered as First, Second and Third Place in Battery Park City.

== Details ==
=== 1st to 7th Streets ===
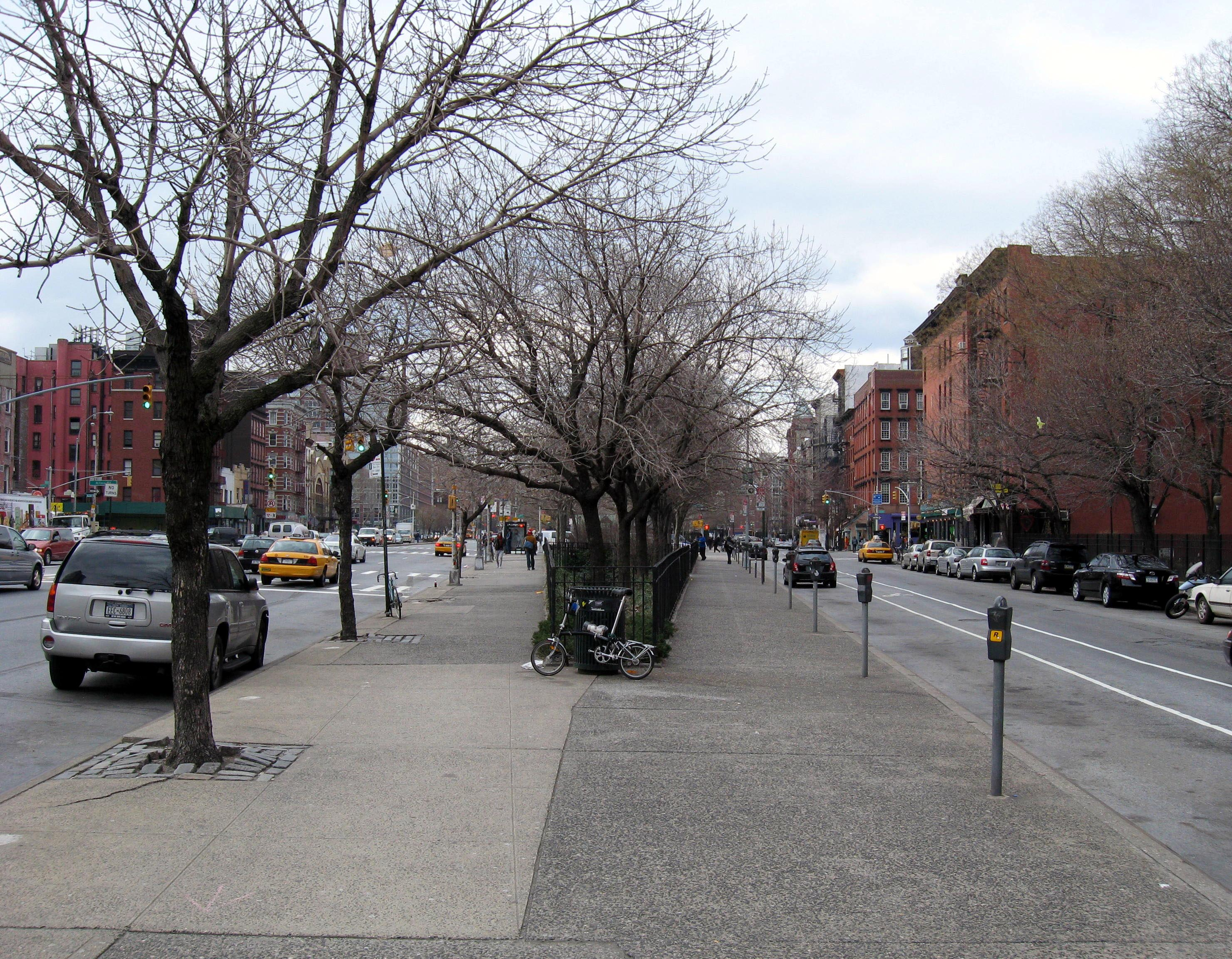
Peretz Square on Houston Street (left) and First Street (right)

East 1st Street begins just north of East Houston Street at Avenue A and continues to the Bowery. Peretz Square, a small triangular sliver park where Houston Street, First Street and First Avenue meet marks the spot where the grid takes hold.

East 2nd Street begins just north of East Houston Street at Avenue C and also continues to the Bowery. The east end of East 3rd, 4th, 5th, and 7th streets is Avenue D, with East 6th Street continuing further eastward and connecting to the FDR Drive.

The west end of most of these streets is the Bowery and Third Avenue, except for 3rd Street (formerly Amity Place), which continues to Sixth Avenue; and 4th Street, which extends west and then north to 13th Street in Greenwich Village. Great Jones Street connects East 3rd to West 3rd.

East 5th Street goes west to Cooper Square, but is interrupted between Avenues B and C by The Earth School and Public School 364, and between First Avenue and Avenue A by the Village View Apartments.

East 6th Street contains many Indian restaurants between First and Second Avenues and is sometimes known as Curry Row.

==== Lengths of streets ====
Street	Start	End	Length
1st Street	Avenue A/E Houston Street	Bowery	0.37 mi (0.6 km)
2nd Street	Avenue D/E Houston Street	Bowery	0.81 mi (1.3 km)
3rd Street (East)	Avenue D	Bowery	0.81 mi (1.3 km)
3rd Street (West)	Broadway	6th Avenue	0.40 mi (0.65 km)
4th Street	Avenue D	W 13th Street	1.9 mi (3.1 km)
5th Street	Avenue D	Cooper Square/Third Avenue	0.62 mi (1 km)
6th Street	FDR Drive	Cooper Square/Third Avenue	0.93 mi (1.5 km)
7th Street	Avenue D	Third Avenue	0.81 mi (1.3 km)

=== 8th and 9th streets ===
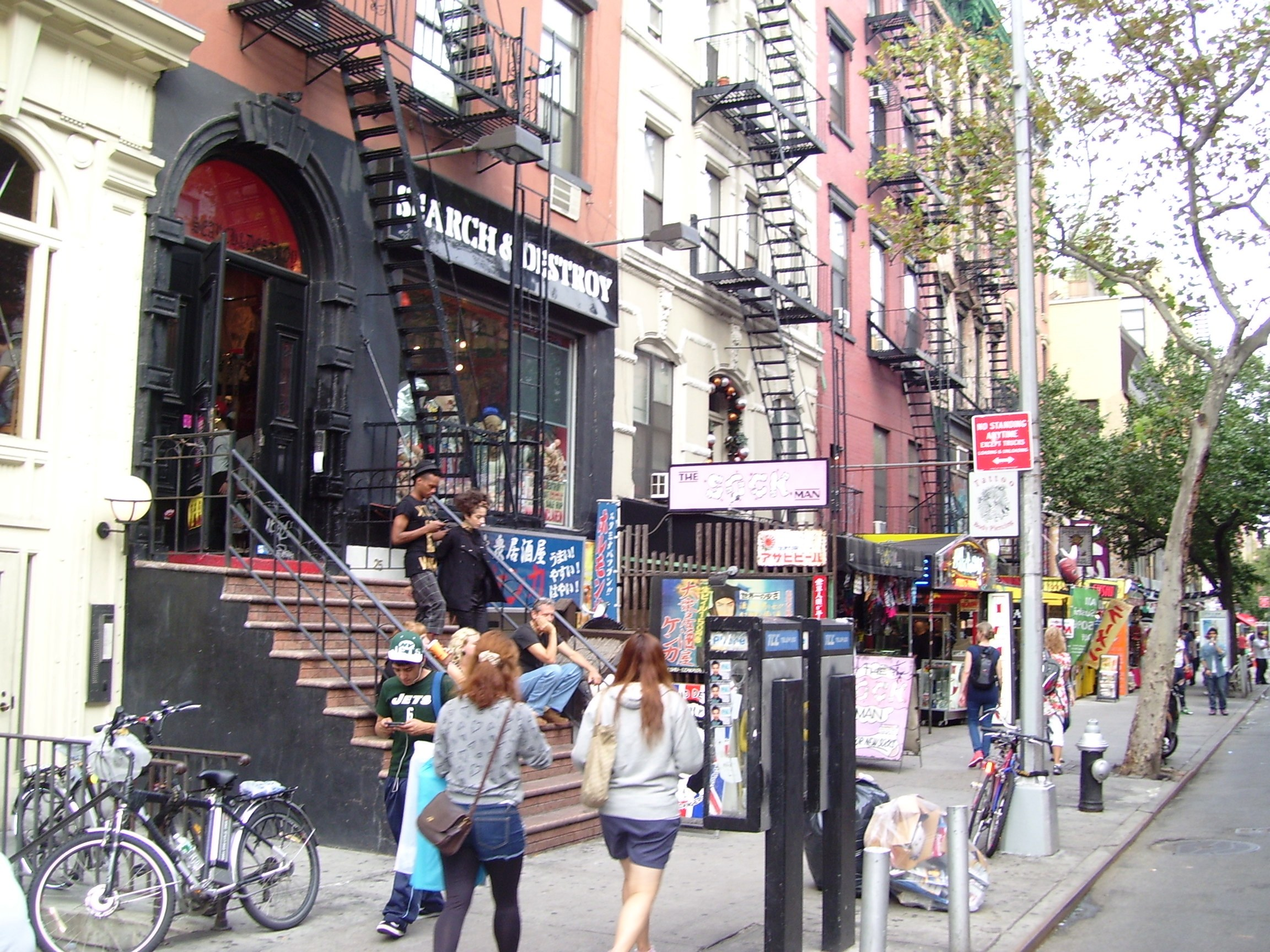
8th Street and St. Mark's Place

8th and 9th streets run parallel to each other, beginning at Avenue D, interrupted by Tompkins Square Park at Avenue B, resuming at Avenue A and continuing to Sixth Avenue. West 8th Street is an important local shopping street. 8th Street between Avenue A and Third Avenue is called St Mark's Place, but it is counted in the length below.

The M8 bus route operates eastbound on 8th Street and westbound on 9th Street between Avenue A and Sixth Avenue. 8th Street has one subway station: Eighth Street–New York University, served by the N, R and W Trains. (N late nights and weekends, R all times except late nights, and W all times except late nights and weekends.)

==== Lengths of streets ====
Street	Start	End	Length
8th Street	Avenue D	Sixth Avenue	1.2 mi (2 km)
9th Street	Avenue D	Sixth Avenue	1.2 mi (2 km)

=== 10th to 13th streets ===
Amos, Hammond, and Troy Streets were in the Greenwich Village street grid before 1811. In the middle 19th century they were renamed as the western parts of West 10th, 11th and 12th Streets, respectively.

10th Street (40.7342580°N 74.0029670°W) begins at the FDR Drive and Avenue C. West of Sixth Avenue, it turns southward about 40 degrees to join the Greenwich Village street grid and continue to West Street on the Hudson River. Because West 4th Street turns northward at Sixth Avenue, it intersects 10th, 11th, 12th and 13th streets in the West Village. The M8 bus operates on 10th Street in both directions between Avenue D and Avenue A, and eastbound between West Street and Sixth Avenue. 10th Street has an eastbound bike lane from West Street to the East River. In 2009, the two-way section of 10th Street between Avenue A and the East River had bicycle markings and sharrows installed, but it still has no dedicated bike lane. West 10th Street was previously named Amos Street for Charles Christopher Amos, who is also the namesake of Charles Street and Christopher Street. The end of West 10th Street toward the Hudson River was once the home of Newgate Prison, New York City's first prison and the United States' second.

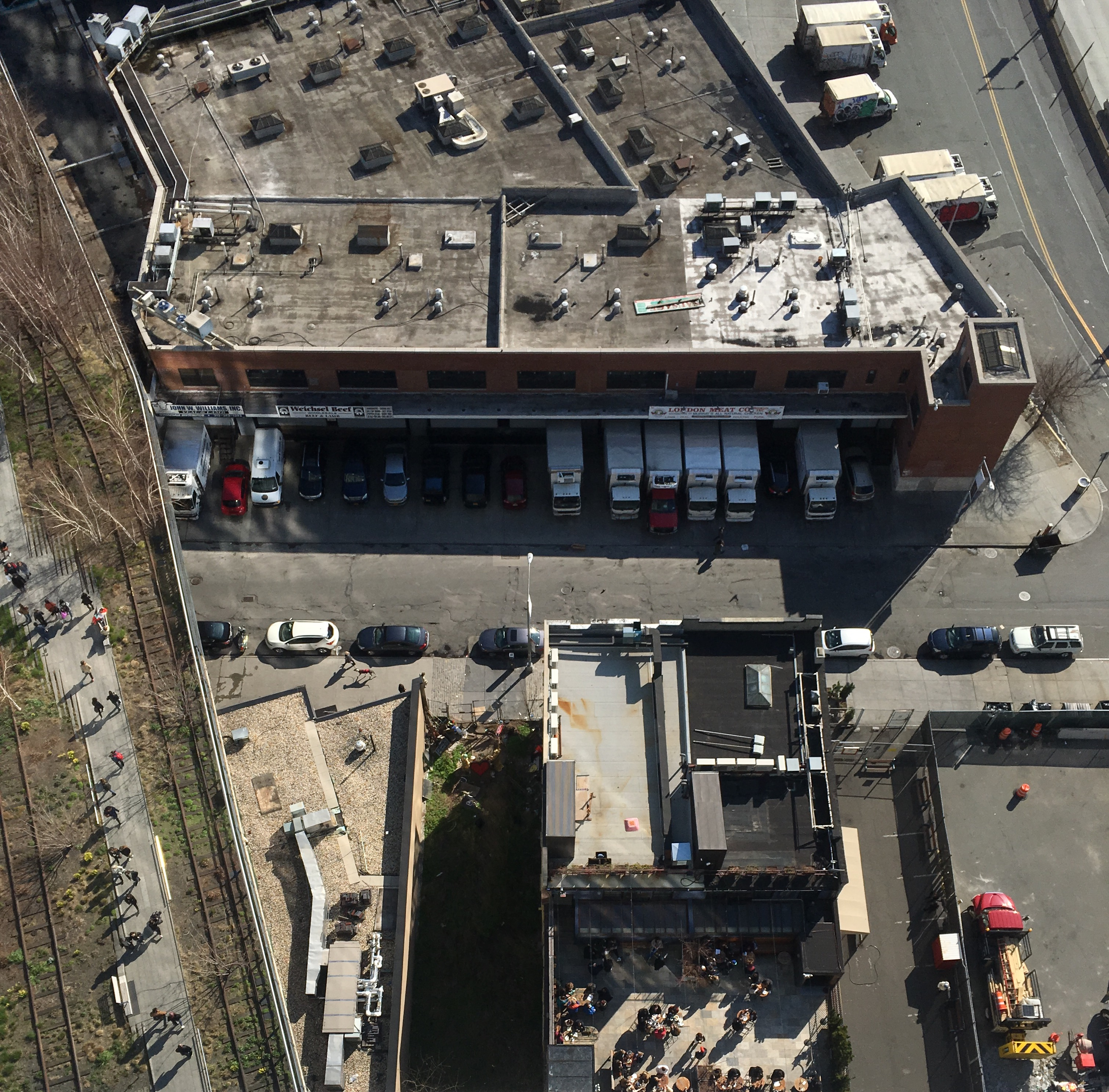
Little West 12th Street as viewed from the rooftop of The Standard, High Line

11th Street is in two parts. It is interrupted by the block containing Grace Church between Broadway and Fourth Avenue. East 11th Street runs from Fourth Avenue to Avenue C and runs past Webster Hall. West 11th Street runs from Broadway to West Street. 11th Street and Sixth Avenue was the location of the Old Grapevine tavern from the 1700s to its demolition in the early 20th century. 12th Street is in two parts. Traffic on most of 12th Street runs from west to east. The first segment of West 12th Street runs southwest to northeast from West Street to Greenwich Street, then turns straight west to east. At Fifth Avenue, West 12th Street becomes East 12th Street, and ends at Avenue C. One block of 12th Street is for pedestrians only and resumes at Szold Place, which runs from north to south toward 10th Street as a continuation of the flow of traffic from East 12th Street which runs east to west from Avenue D to Szold Place.

Additionally, Little West 12th Street runs parallel to West 13th Street from West Street to the northeast corner of Ninth Avenue and Gansevoort Street.

13th Street is in three parts. The first runs from Avenue C to Avenue D. The second starts at a dead end, just before Avenue B, and runs to Greenwich Avenue, and the third part is from Eighth Avenue to Tenth Avenue.

==== Lengths of 10th to 13th streets ====
Street	Start	End	Length
10th Street	FDR Drive	West Street	2.1 mi (3.4 km)
11th Street	Avenue C	West Street	1.7 mi (2.8 km)
12th Street	Avenue C	West Street	1.9 mi (3.1 km)
13th Street	Avenue C	Avenue D	0.19 mi (0.3 km)
13th Street	dead end (Av B)	Tenth Avenue	1.9 mi (3 km)

=== 14th Street ===
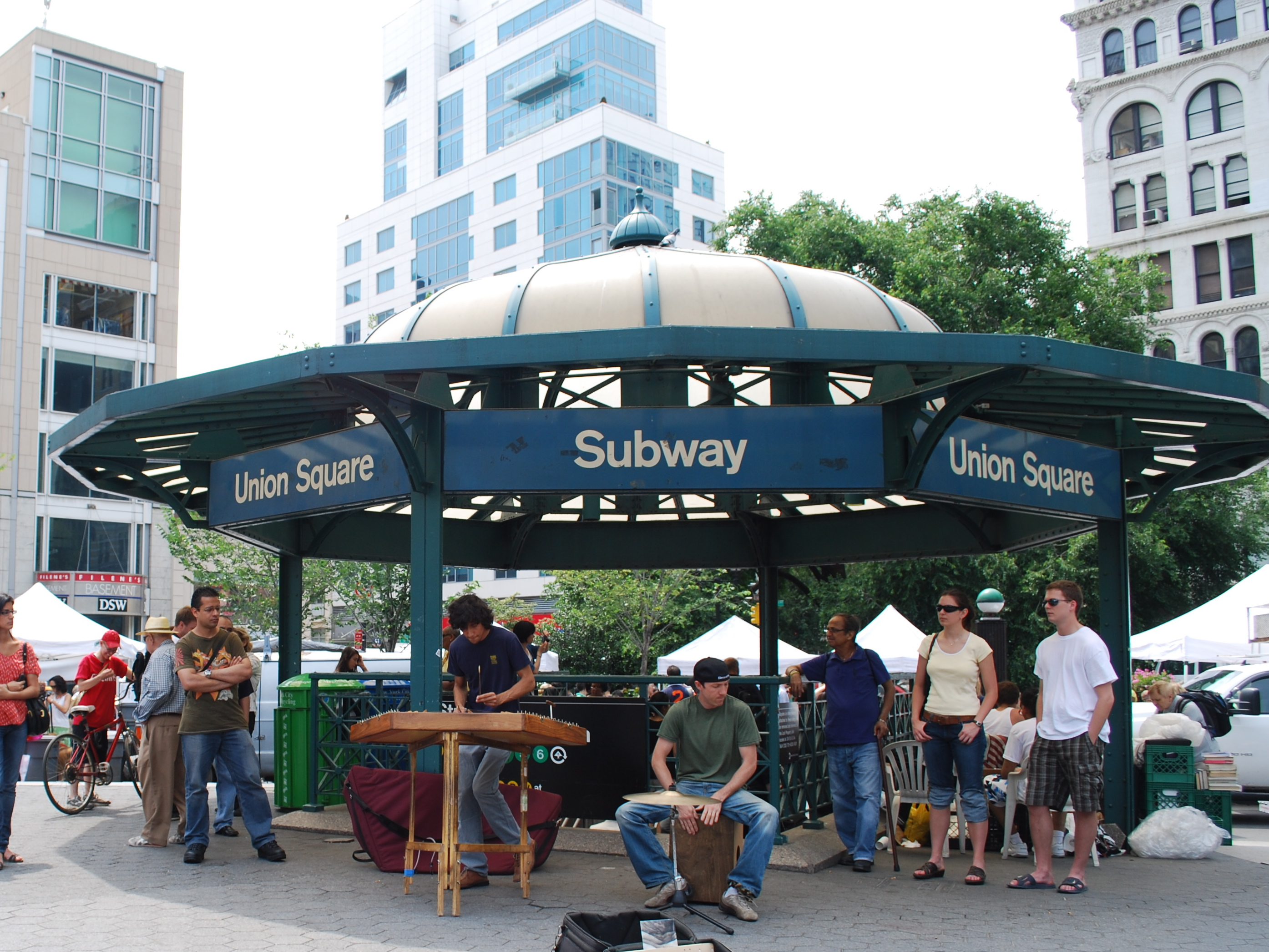
14th Street–Union Square station

14th Street is a main numbered street in Manhattan. It begins at Avenue C and ends at West Street. Its length is 3.4 km (2.1 mi). It has six subway stations:

- First Avenue (L train)
- Third Avenue (L train)
- 14th Street – Union Square (4, 5, 6, <6>, L, N, Q, R, and W trains)
- 14th Street / Sixth Avenue (1, 2, 3, F and <F>, L, and M trains)
- 14th Street – Eighth Avenue (A, C, E, and L trains)

From Avenue A or Avenue C to West Street there is service M14A/D bus. At 6th Avenue, there is a PATH stop with service to Midtown Manhattan and New Jersey.

=== 15th Street ===
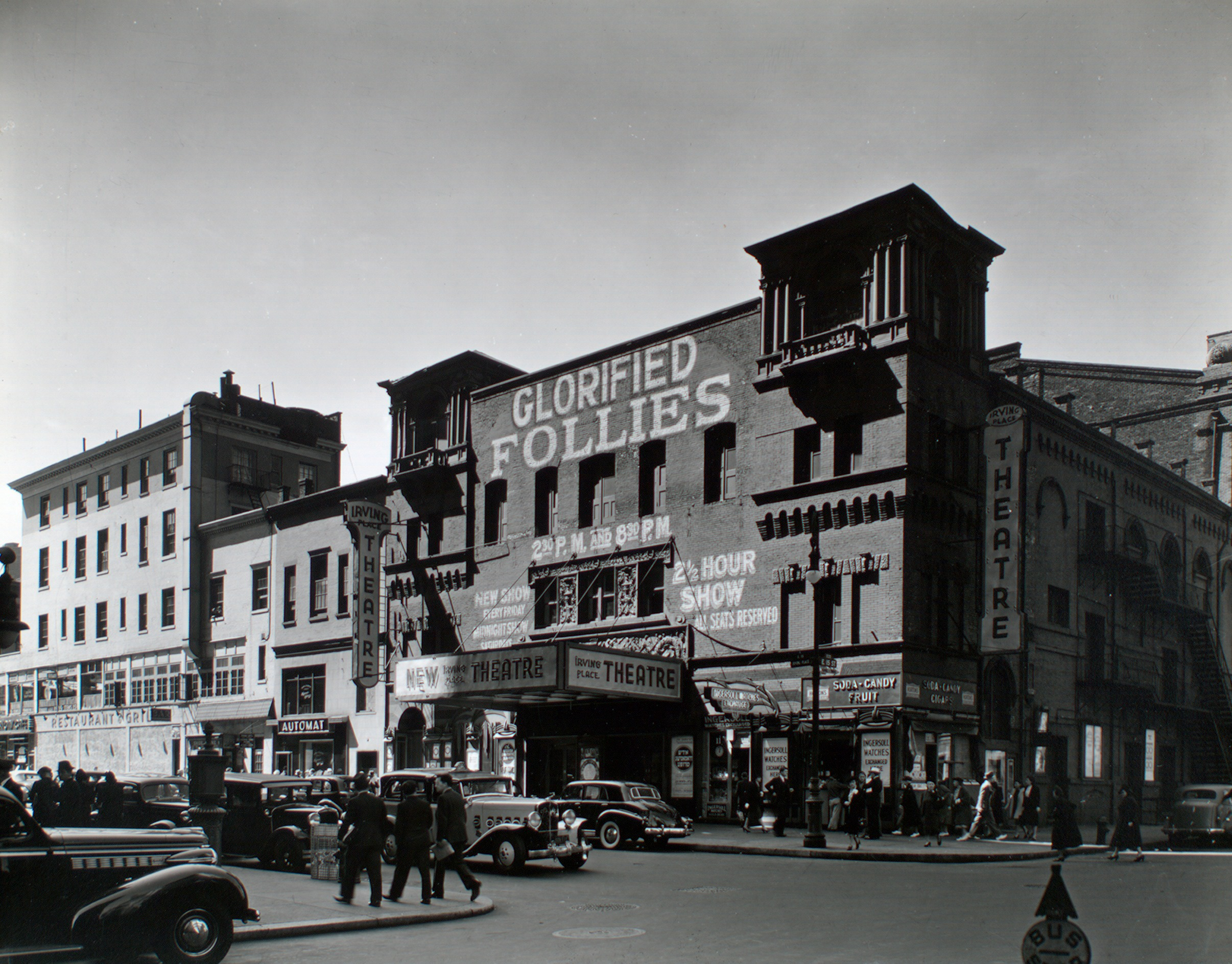
Irving Place Theatre as seen from the corner of Irving Place and East 15th Street

Traffic on 15th Street moves from east to west. The street formerly started at the FDR Drive, but most of the street between the Drive and Avenue C was permanently closed, as was the 15th Street exit from the Drive, after the September 11 attacks, due to the presence of the Con Edison East River Generating Station there. Only Con Edison personnel have access to the closed portion.

The street is then interrupted by Stuyvesant Town from Avenue C to First Avenue. It then continues to Union Square East (Park Avenue South) where it is interrupted by Union Square It picks up again at Union Square West, and continues unimpeded to Eleventh Avenue at the Hudson River.

Sights along 15th Street include: the southern border of Stuyvesant Square; the landmarked Friends Meeting House and Seminary at Rutherford Place; Irving Plaza at Irving Place; the Daryl Roth Theatre in the landmarked Union Square Savings Bank Building, across the street from the Zeckendorf Towers at Union Square East; the Google Building between Eighth and Ninth Avenues; Chelsea Market, between Ninth and Tenth Avenues; and the High Line near Tenth Avenue.

15th Street is 1.9 mi (3 km) in length.

=== 16th Street ===
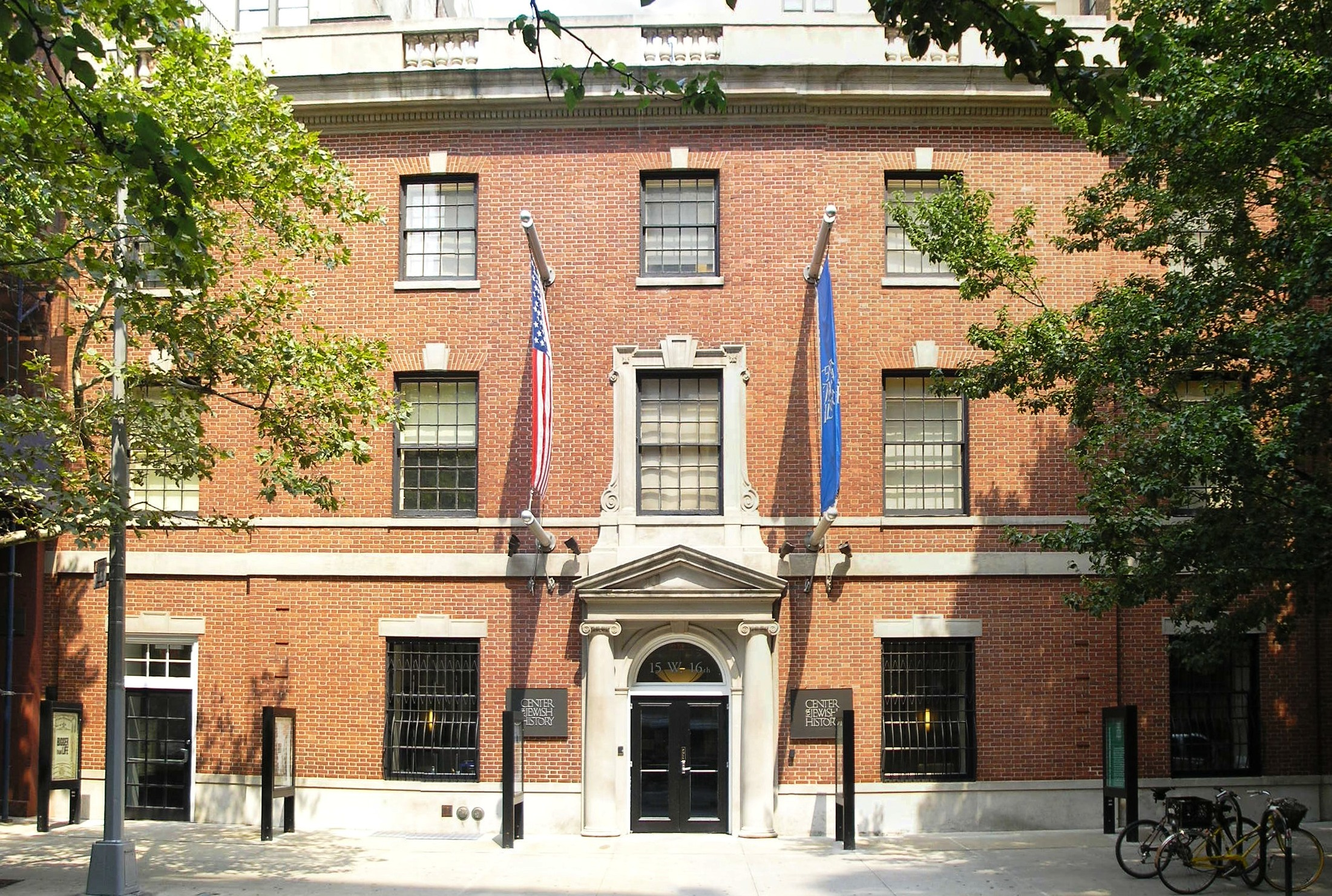
The Center for Jewish History at 15 W. 16th Street

Traffic on 16th Street moves from west to east. It starts at Eleventh Avenue at the Hudson River, and runs until it is interrupted at Union Square West (Broadway) by Union Square. It picks up again on the other side of the park at Union Square East (Park Avenue South), but is shortly stopped again by Stuyvesant Square from between Second and Third Avenues (Rutherford Place) to between First and Second Avenues (Perlman Place). At First Avenue, it is interrupted by Stuyvesant Town, and starts up again at Avenue C. It then dead ends between that avenue and the FDR Drive.

Sights on 16th Street include: the High Line near Tenth Avenue; Chelsea Market between Ninth and Tenth Avenues; the Google Building between Eighth and Ninth Avenues; the row houses at 5, 7, 9, 17, 19, 21 & 23 West 16th Street between Fifth and Sixth Avenues; the Bank of the Metropolis at Union Square West; and St. George's Church at Rutherford Place.

16th Street is 1.8 mi (2.9 km) long.

=== 17th to 19th streets ===
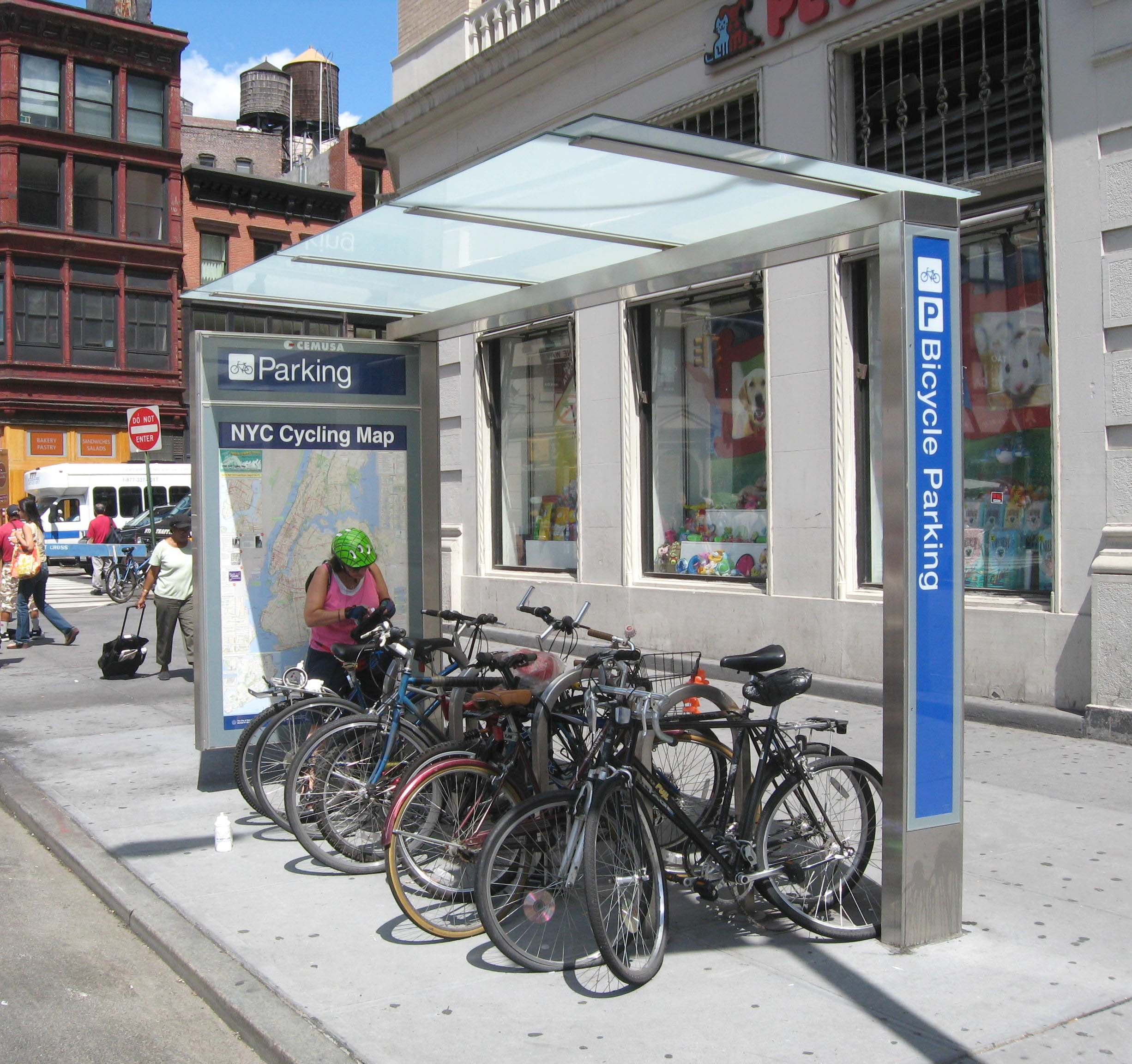
Bike parking at 17th Street in 2008

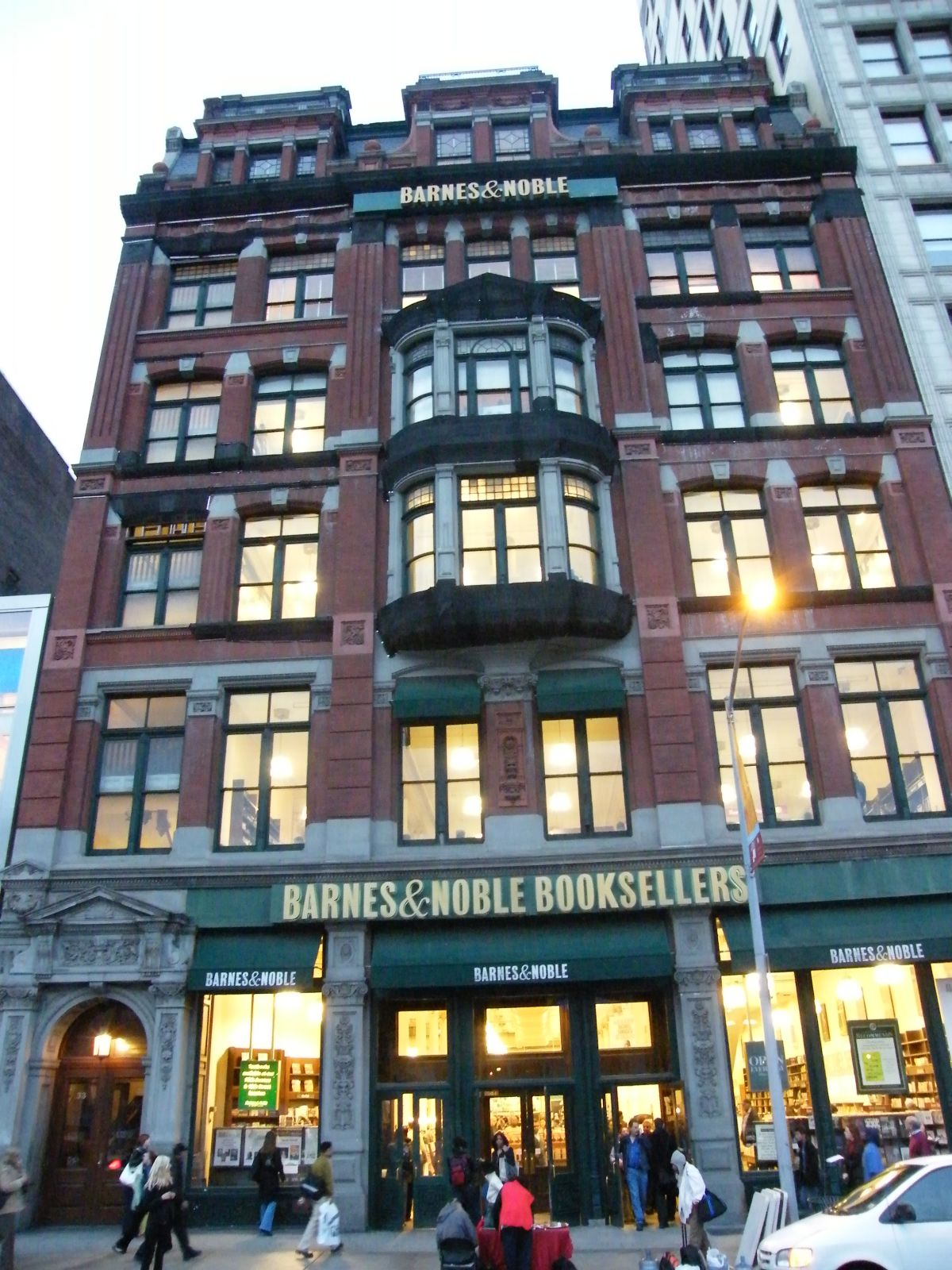
33 East 17th Street has been named to the National Register of Historic Places.

17th, 18th and 19th streets start at First Avenue and finish at Eleventh Avenue.

On 17th Street (40.735532°N 73.986575°W), traffic runs one way along the street, from east to west excepting the stretch between Broadway and Park Avenue South, where traffic runs in both directions. It forms the northern borders of both Union Square (between Broadway and Park Avenue South) and Stuyvesant Square. Composer Antonín Dvořák's New York home was located at 327 East 17th Street, near Perlman Place. The house was razed by Beth Israel Medical Center after it received approval of a 1991 application to demolish the house and replace it with an AIDS hospice with financing from the photographer Robert Mapplethorpe. Time Magazine was started at 141 East 17th Street.

18th Street has a local subway station at the crossing with Seventh Avenue, served by the 1 (and the 2 at late nights) on the IRT Broadway–Seventh Avenue Line. There used to be an 18th Street station on the IRT Lexington Avenue Line at the crossing with Park Avenue South. This street is home to the IAC Building, designed by Frank Gehry.

19th Street travels west for most of its length, except between Tenth and Eleventh Avenues the travel direction is reversed and traffic flows east.

==== Lengths of streets ====
Street	Start	End	Length
17th Street	First Avenue	Eleventh Avenue	1.6 mi (2.6 km)
18th Street	First Avenue	Eleventh Avenue	1.6 mi (2.6 km)
19th Street	First Avenue	Eleventh Avenue	1.6 mi (2.6 km)

=== 20th to 22nd streets ===
20th Street starts at Avenue C, and 21st and 22nd Streets begin at First Avenue. They all end at Eleventh Avenue. Travel on the last block of the 20th, 21st, and 22nd streets, between Tenth and Eleventh Avenues, is in the opposite direction than it is on the rest of the respective street. 20th Street is very wide from the Avenue C to First Avenue.

Along the southern perimeter of Gramercy Park, between Gramercy Park East and Gramercy Park West, 20th Street is known as Gramercy Park South.

Between Second and Third Avenues, 21st Street is alternatively known as Police Officer Anthony Sanchez Way. Along the northern perimeter of Gramercy Park, between Gramercy Park East and Gramercy Park West, 21st Street is known as Gramercy Park North.

==== Lengths of streets ====
Street	Start	End	Length
20th Street	FDR Drive	Eleventh Avenue	1.9 mi (3.1 km)
21st Street	First Avenue	Eleventh Avenue	1.7 mi (2.7 km)
22nd Street	First Avenue	Eleventh Avenue	1.7 mi (2.7 km)

=== 23rd Street ===
Hot air gusts and a woman's skirt flairs up, a possible origin of the expression "23 skidoo", c. 1901

23rd Street is another main numbered street in Manhattan. It begins at Avenue C/FDR Drive and ends at Eleventh Avenue. Its length is 1.9 miles (3.1 km). It has two-way travel. On 23rd Street there are five local subway stations providing uptown and downtown service only:

- 23rd Street–Baruch College at the crossing with Park Avenue South (4, 6, and <6> trains) on the IRT Lexington Avenue Line
- 23rd Street at the crossing with Fifth Avenue (N, Q, R, and W trains) on the BMT Broadway Line
- 23rd Street at the crossing with Sixth Avenue (F, <F>, and M trains) on the IND Sixth Avenue Line
- 23rd Street at the crossing with Seventh Avenue (1 and 2 trains) on the IRT Broadway–Seventh Avenue Line
- 23rd Street at the crossing with Eighth Avenue (A, C, and E trains) on the IND Eighth Avenue Line

Additionally, there is the M23 Select Bus Service, running through the length of 23rd Street.

=== 24th to 26th streets ===
24th Street is in three parts. A small portion of 24th Street exists between First Avenue and East Midtown Plaza ending at a dead end before Second Avenue, a second portion is between East Midtown Plaza and Madison Avenue, ending because of Madison Square Park. 25th Street, which is in three parts, starts at FDR Drive, is a pedestrian plaza between Third Avenue and Lexington Avenue, and ends at Madison. Then West 24th and 25th streets continue from Fifth Avenue to Eleventh Avenue (25th) or Twelfth Avenue (24th). The two cul-de-sacs on 24th Street between First and Second avenues were created in the late 1960s to connect the northern and southern blocks of East Midtown Plaza with a mid-block pedestrian plaza having a focal point on St. Sebastian Church. The pedestrian plaza on 25th Street between Third and Lexington avenues, named the "Clivner=Field Plaza", was completed in 2021 and provides outdoor space for the campus of Baruch College.

26th Street is all in one part and after reaching FDR Drive bends and runs parallel to FDR Drive up to 30th Street.

=== 27th Street ===
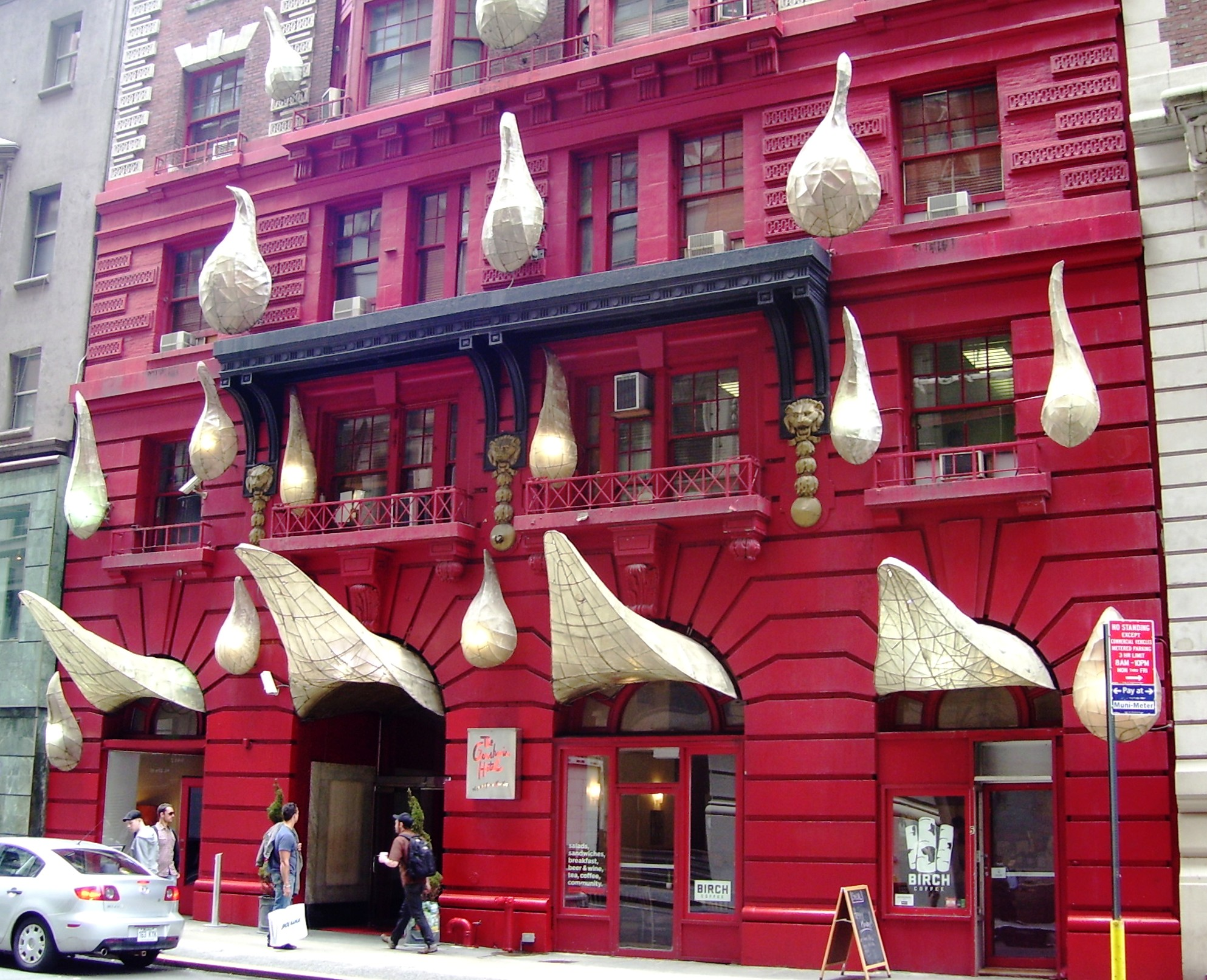
Gershwin Hotel on East 27th Street

27th Street is a one-way street that runs from Second Avenue to the West Side Highway with an interruption between Eighth Avenue and Tenth Avenue. It is most noted for its strip between Tenth and Eleventh Avenues, known as Club Row because it features numerous nightclubs and lounges.

Some of the most notable venues are Bungalow 8, Marquee, Suzie Wong, Cain, and Pink Elephant. Since 2011, starting at 530 W. 27th and continuing down almost the entire rest of the block, the former warehouse spaces of clubs Twilo, Guesthouse, Home, Bed, and more have been repurposed by British immersive theater group Punchdrunk as The McKittrick Hotel, the site of their theatrical experience Sleep No More.

Heading east, 27th Street passes through Chelsea Park between Tenth and Ninth Avenues, with the Fashion Institute of Technology (FIT) on the corner of Eighth. On Madison Avenue between 26th and 27th streets, on the site of the old Madison Square Garden, is the New York Life Building, built in 1928 and designed by Cass Gilbert, with a square tower topped by a striking gilded pyramid. Twenty-Seventh Street passes one block north of Madison Square Park and culminates at Bellevue Hospital on First Avenue. The segment of 27th Street east of Second Avenue is a pedestrian mall and passes through Bellevue South Park.

==== Lengths of streets ====
Street	Start	End	Length
24th Street	First Avenue	Madison Avenue	0.56 mi (0.9 km)
24th Street	Fifth Avenue	Twelfth Avenue	1.2 mi (1.9 km)
25th Street	FDR Drive	Madison Avenue	0.75 mi (1.2 km)
25th Street	Fifth Avenue	Eleventh Avenue	1.1 mi (1.7 km)
26th Street	30th Street/FDR Drive	Twelfth Avenue	2.2 mi (3.5 km)
27th Street	Second Avenue	Eighth Avenue	1.1 mi (1.7 km)
27th Street	Ninth Avenue	Twelfth Avenue	0.50 mi (0.8 km)

=== 28th Street ===
There are three local subway stations on 28th Street:

- 28th Street (4, 6, and <6> trains) on the IRT Lexington Avenue Line at Park Avenue South
- 28th Street (N, R, and W trains) the BMT Broadway Line at Broadway
- 28th Street (1 and 2 trains) on the IRT Broadway–Seventh Avenue Line at Seventh Avenue

Also:

- The former 28th Street station on PATH at Sixth Avenue

=== 30th Street ===
30th Street runs uninterrupted across the island from 12th Avenue to FDR Drive. It is the southern terminus of Dyer Avenue and thus also of the Lincoln Tunnel's eastern approach. There is also an elevator with access to the High Line on the West Side. Tisch Hospital is bounded on the south by 30th Street between 1st Avenue and FDR Drive.

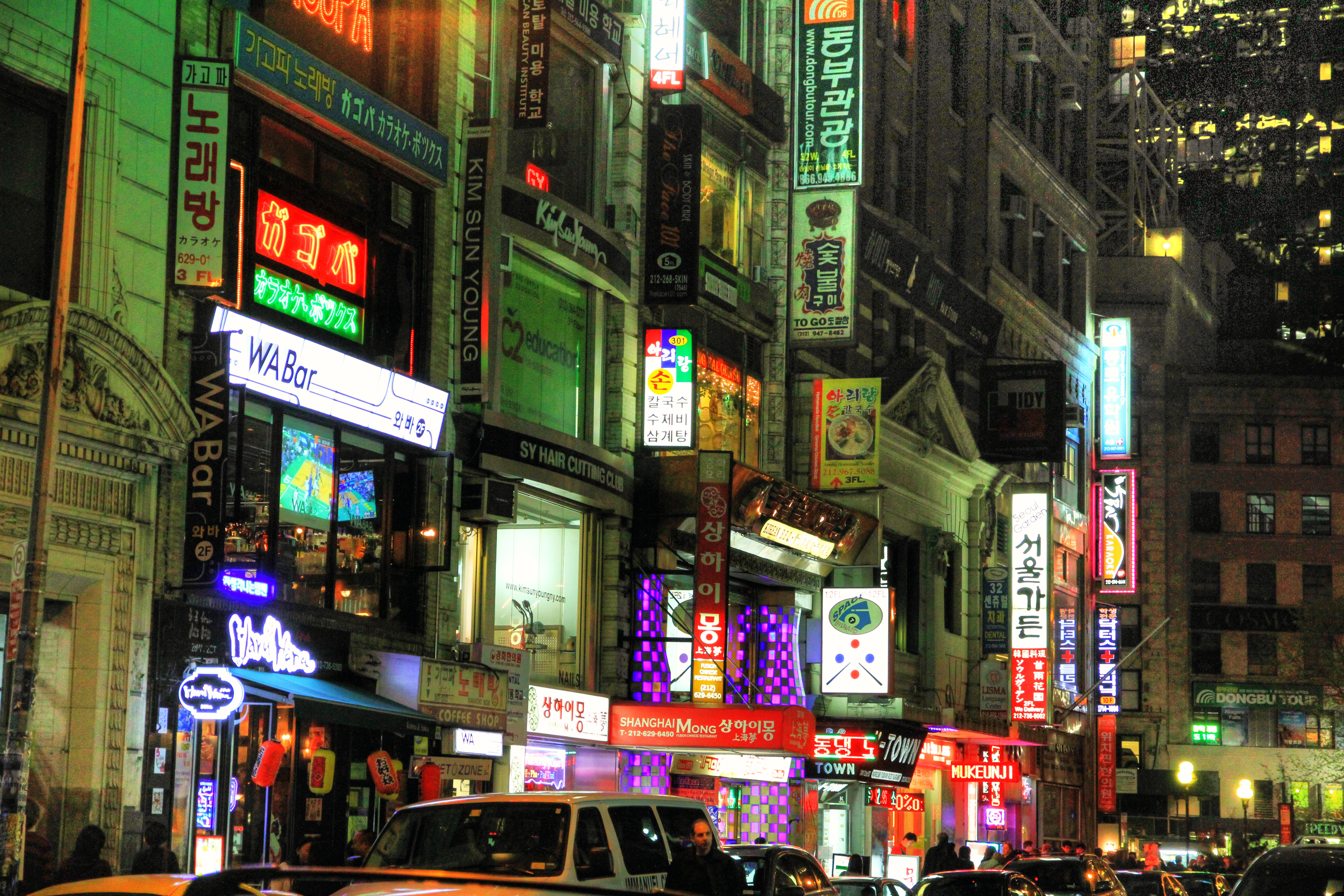
Korea Way in Koreatown on 32nd Street, with street signage in Hangul

The segment of 30th Street between First and Second avenues was widened by 20 feet (6.1 m) in the 1950s when the superblock for Kips Bay Towers was created.

=== 31st and 32nd streets ===
31st Street begins on the West Side at the entrances to 10 Hudson Yards and The Shops & Restaurants at Hudson Yards, while 32nd Street, which includes a segment officially known as Korea Way between Fifth Avenue and Broadway in Manhattan's Koreatown, begins at the entrance to Penn Station and Madison Square Garden. On the East Side, both streets end at Second Avenue, where the street grid is interrupted by superblocks containing Kips Bay Towers and NYU Medical Center.

The Catholic church of St. Francis of Assisi is situated at 135–139 West 31st Street. At 210 West is the Capuchin Monastery of St. John the Baptist, part of St. John the Baptist Church on 30th Street. At the corner of Broadway and West 31st Street is the Grand Hotel. The former Hotel Pierrepont was located at 43 West 32nd Street, The Continental NYC tower is at the corner of Sixth Avenue and 32nd Street. 29 East 32nd Street was the location of the first building owned by the Grolier Club between 1890 and 1917. In 2017, the segment of 32nd Street between Second and Third avenues was co-named "Ms. Magazine Way" in honor of the location where the publication was launched at 207 East 32nd Street.

=== 33rd Street ===
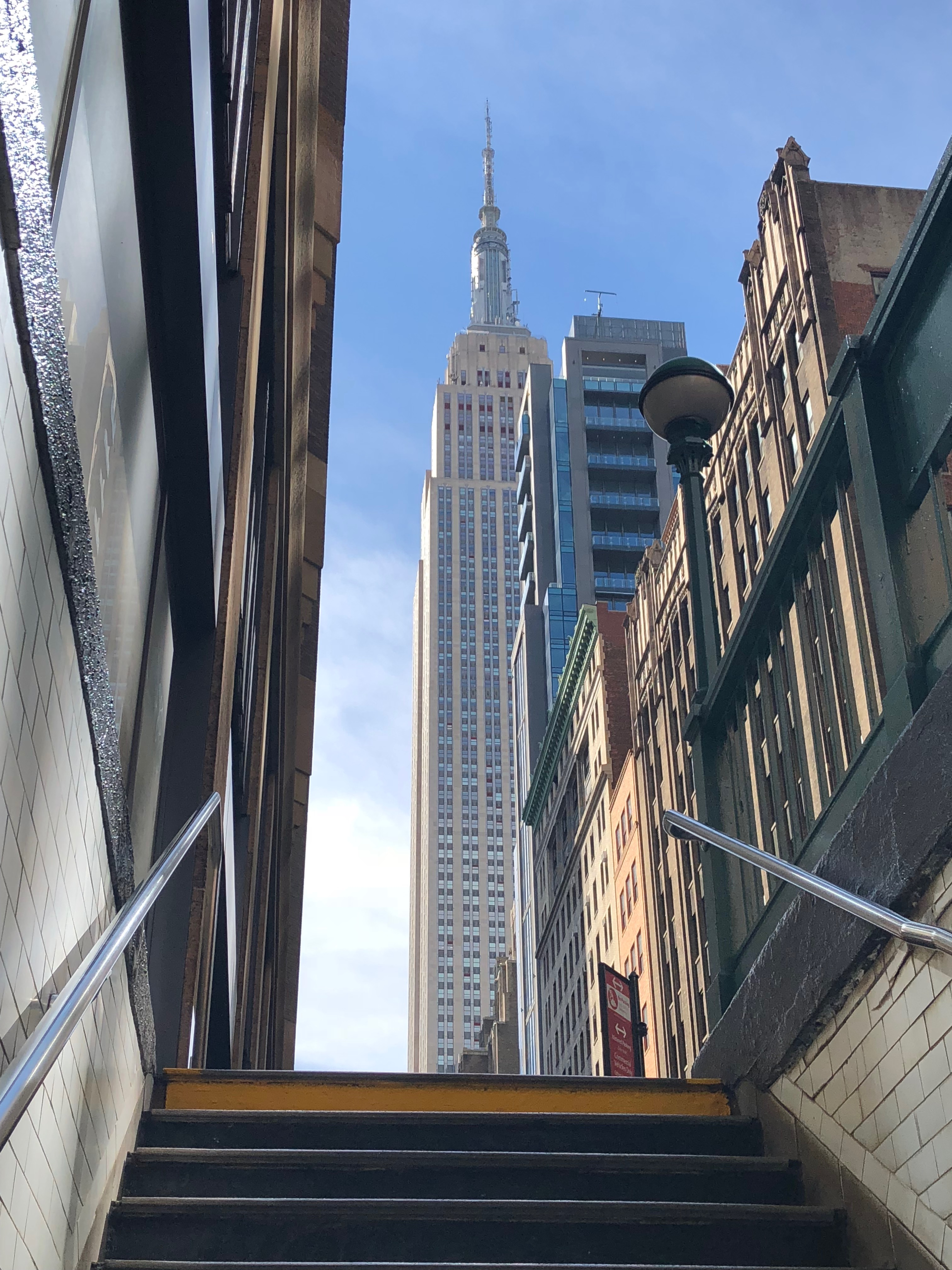
The Empire State Building seen from 33rd Street and Park Avenue Subway Station

33rd Street runs uninterrupted from First Avenue to Seventh Avenue where it turns into a pedestrian road for a quarter of a block and turns back into a street. Then it runs the rest of the way to 12th Avenue. It runs on the north side of Hudson Yards and the south side of the Empire State Building.

The segment of 33rd Street between First and Second avenues was widened by 20 feet (6.1 m) in the 1950s when the superblock for Kips Bay Towers was created. In 2018, the same street segment was converted from one-way to two-way traffic to improve access for ambulances traveling to emergency entrance of NYU Langone Health on First Avenue. At Park Avenue, 33rd Street was closed to westbound through traffic beginning in 1999, when barriers were installed at the southern end of the Park Avenue Tunnel. In 2019, the segment of 33rd Street between Tenth and Eleventh avenues was reconstructed as part of the Hudson Yards Redevelopment Project, which included raising the street elevation by up to 15 feet (4.6 m) for integration with Hudson Boulevard.

=== 35th Street ===
35th Street runs from FDR Drive to Eleventh Avenue. Notable locations include East River Ferry, Mercy University Manhattan Campus, and the Jacob K. Javits Convention Center.

=== 36th to 39th streets ===
36th Street runs from the FDR Drive to Eleventh Avenue. It runs on the south side of the Queens–Midtown Tunnel's Manhattan entrance/exit and over the Lincoln Tunnel's Manhattan entrance/exit. Notable locations on 36th Street are the American Copper Buildings, Sniffen Court, The Morgan Library & Museum, Gotham Hall, and the Javits Center.

37th Street runs from the FDR Drive to Eleventh Avenue. It runs on the north side of the Queens–Midtown Tunnel's Manhattan entrance/exit and over the Lincoln Tunnel's Manhattan entrance/exit. Notable locations on 37th Street are the Corinthian, the Morgan Library & Museum, Gotham Hall, and the Javits Center.

38th Street runs from FDR Drive to Eleventh Avenue. It runs on the south side of the Lincoln Tunnel's Manhattan entrance/exit. Notable locations on 38th Street are The Corinthian, The Town House Hotel, 425 Fifth Avenue, and the Javits Center.

39th Street runs from First Avenue to Eleventh Avenue. It runs over the Lincoln Tunnel's Manhattan entrance/exit. A notable location on 39th Street is the Astro's Dog Run.

=== 40th to 57th streets ===
A portion of West 46th Street between Eighth and Ninth Avenues is nicknamed Restaurant Row, after the number of restaurants located along its length. Mayor John Lindsay had designated the street as Restaurant Row in 1973, honoring 16 restaurants on the block.

=== 58th Street ===
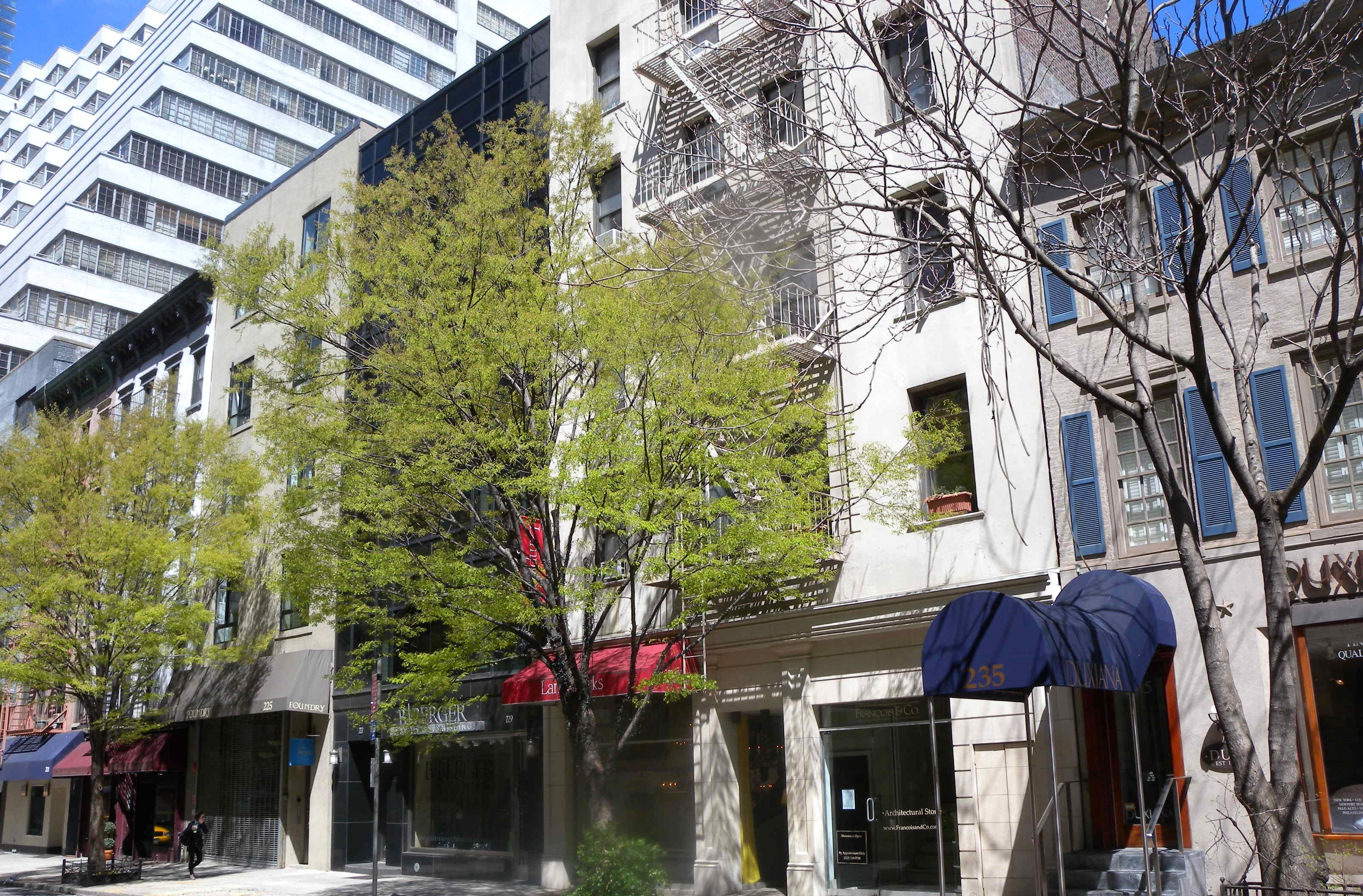
Shops along Designers' Way

A section of East 58th Street (40°45′40.3″N 73°57′56.9″W) between Lexington and Second Avenues is known as Designers' Way and features many high-end interior design and decoration establishments.

=== 61st Street ===
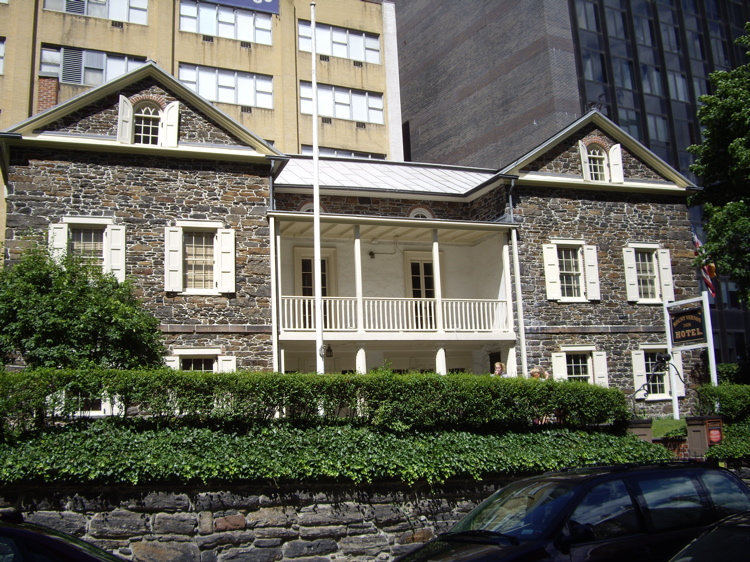
Mount Vernon Hotel Museum on East 61st Street

The Mount Vernon Hotel Museum, one of only eight surviving pre-1800 buildings in Manhattan, is located at 421 East 61st Street. The Pierre, a luxury hotel opened in 1930, is at 2 East 61st Street, at the intersection with Fifth Avenue. The Gateway School, an independent school for children aged 5 to 14 with learning disabilities, is located at 211 West 61st Street. The Consulate-General of Russia in New York City was opened at 7–9 East 61st Street in 1933 and closed in 1948.

=== 74th Street ===
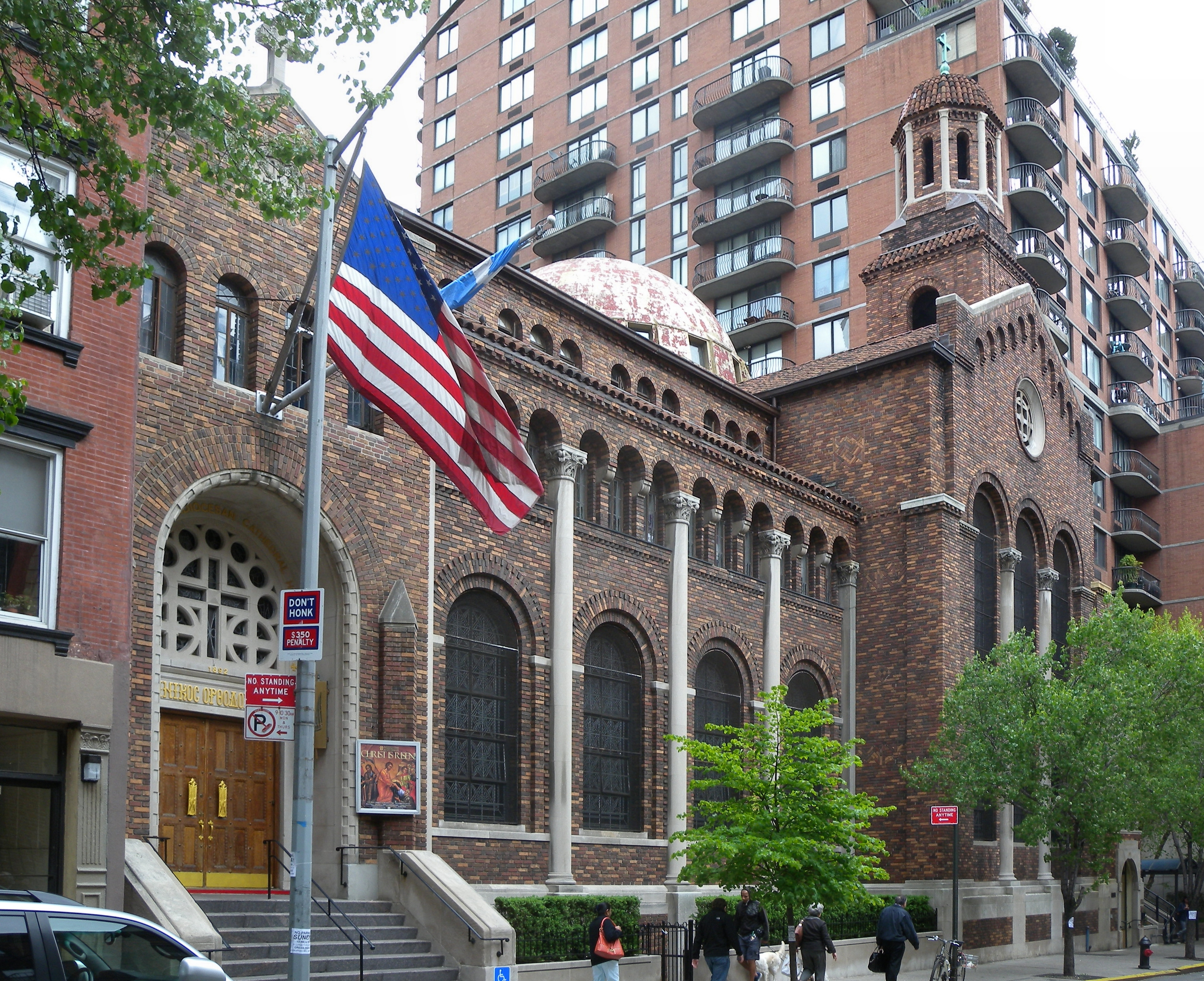
Archdiocesan Cathedral of the Holy Trinity

=== 77th and 78th streets ===
East 77th and 78th streets run normally west of York Avenue, but east of York Avenue, 77th runs east, and 78th runs west, to accommodate the Pavilion at 500 East 77th. The FDR Drive has an exit at 78th and an entrance at 79th. At the corner of 77th and York, on which sits PS 158, pedestrians cross 77th on red and wait on the green on the east side of York.

=== 80th Street ===
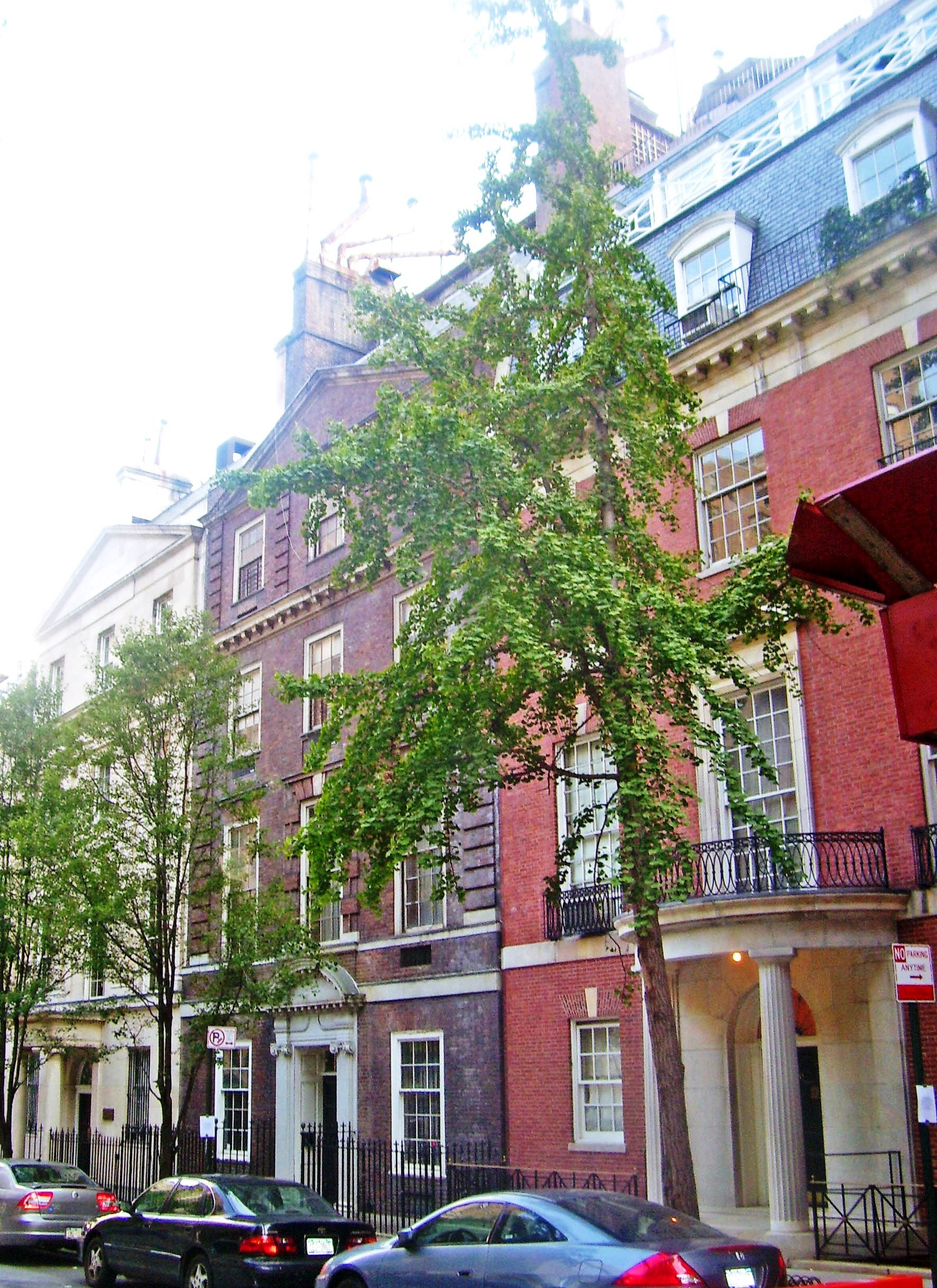
120-130 East 80th Street, with three of the four East 80th Street Houses: Astor House (on left), Whitney House (on right), and Dillon House between them.

As with all of Manhattan's numbered streets from 60th to 109th Street, 80th Street is divided by Central Park into eastern and western sections. Traffic on 80th Street, on both sides of the park, runs west to east.

West 80th Street begins at Riverside Drive on the Upper West Side, then passes West End Avenue, Broadway, and Amsterdam Avenue, then stops at Columbus Avenue when it reaches the grounds on the American Museum of Natural History.

Significant buildings on West 80th Street include those in the Riverside Drive–West 80th–81st Street Historic District, on both sides of the street's block between Riverside Drive and West End Avenue, such as the "Gothicesque" row houses at 307–317 West 80th Street designed by Charles H. Israels, and those at 319–323 West 80th Street designed by Clarence F. True. True also designed the "vaguely Georgian" 328 West 80th Street on the same block, which also contains George F. Pelham II's 411 West End Avenue, an Art Deco apartment building.

East 80th Street begins at Fifth Avenue on the Upper East Side and continues past Madison, Park, Lexington, and Third, where it enters the section of the Upper East Side called Yorkville. It then continues past Second, First, York and East End Avenues before dead-ending at the FDR Drive.

Significant buildings on East 80th Street include the American Irish Historical Society at 991 Fifth Avenue; the houses of Franklyn and Edna Woolworth and her two sisters at 2, 4, and 6 East 80th Street, built by F. W. Woolworth and designed by C. P. H. Gilbert; the postmodern 45 East 80th Street at Madison Avenue, designed by Liebman Liebman & Associates; the raw concrete 1967 Manhattan Church of Christ by Eggers & Higgins; 52 East 80th Street between Madison and Park, built in the 1890s.

Also on East 80th Street there are many houses between Park and Lexington, collectively referred to as the East 80th Street Houses, which are listed as such on the National Register of Historic Places, although they are separately designated as landmarks by the New York City Landmarks Preservation Commission: the Lewis Spencer and Emily Coster Morris House at 116 East 80th Street built in 1922–23 and designed by Cross & Cross; the George and Martha Whitney House at #120, built in 1929–30 and designed by the same firm; 124 East 80th Street, the neo-Georgian Clarence and Anne Douglas Dillon House of 1930, designed by Mott B. Schmidt; and the same designer's Vincent and Helen Astor House at #130, built in 1927–28 and now the Junior League of the City of New York. At 1157 Lexington Avenue is the 1932 Unitarian Church of All Souls, designed by Robert Upjohn.

In Yorktown, the c.1890 Hungarian Baptist Church is located at 225 East 80th between Second and Third Avenues; and the City University of New York administration building, which was originally the Welfare Island Dispensary, and then the New York City Board of Higher Education, is at 535 East 80th Street at East End Avenue, built in 1940.

=== 90th Street ===
90th Street is split into two segments. The first segment, West 90th Street begins at Riverside Drive and ends at Central Park West or West Drive, when it is open, in Central Park on the Upper West Side. The second segment of East 90th Street begins at East Drive, at Engineers Gate of Central Park. When East Drive is closed, East 90th Street begins at Fifth Avenue on the Upper East Side and curves to the right at the FDR Drive becoming East End Avenue. Our Lady of Good Counsel Church, is located on East 90th Street between Third Avenue and Second Avenue, across the street from Ruppert Towers (1601 and 1619 Third Avenue) and Ruppert Park. Asphalt Green is a nonprofit community center dedicated to sports, fitness, and wellness located on East 90th Street between York Avenue and East End Avenue.

=== 97th Street ===
97th Street is the site of the Park Avenue Tunnel and the northernmost transverse of Central Park. Metropolitan Hospital Center is located at First Avenue, and the Islamic Cultural Center of New York, the oldest mosque in New York City, is located at Third Avenue. The street hosts a year-round farmer's market Fridays mornings between Columbus Avenue and Amsterdam Avenue.

=== 112th Street ===
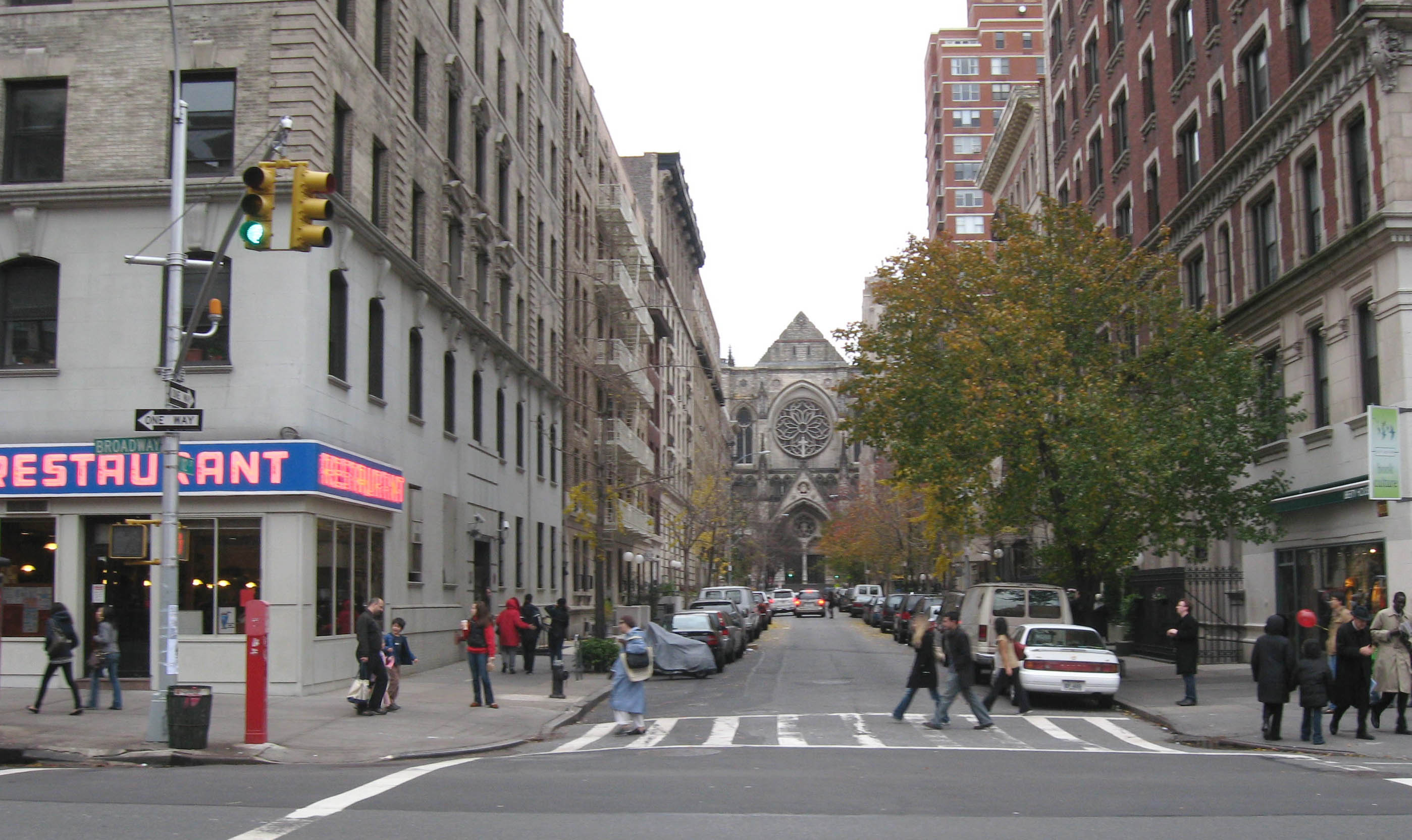
112th Street East of Broadway

112th Street starts in Morningside Heights and runs from Riverside Drive to Amsterdam Avenue, where it meets the steps of the Cathedral of St. John the Divine. The street resumes at the eastern edge of Morningside Park and extends through Harlem before ending at First Avenue adjacent Thomas Jefferson Park in East Harlem. Notable locations include:

- The exterior of Tom's Restaurant, located at the corner of 112th Street and Broadway in Morningside Heights, was routinely used for transitions in the popular 1990s sitcom Seinfeld. The building, which is owned by Columbia University, is also called Armstrong Hall. Its upper floors house NASA's Goddard Institute for Space Studies, the Center for Climate Systems Research, and offices for the Columbia Business School executive education program. Philosopher John Dewey also lived there.
- The axis of the Cathedral of St. John the Divine is aligned with 112th Street. The street is interrupted by the cathedral's west front at Amsterdam Avenue, and the iconic east end of the cathedral looms over the street's path where it continues through central Harlem at a lower elevation, east of Morningside Park.
- A monument to Samuel J. Tilden, the 25th New York governor and Democratic presidential candidate in 1876, stands at the foot of 112th Street along Riverside Drive.

=== 114th Street ===
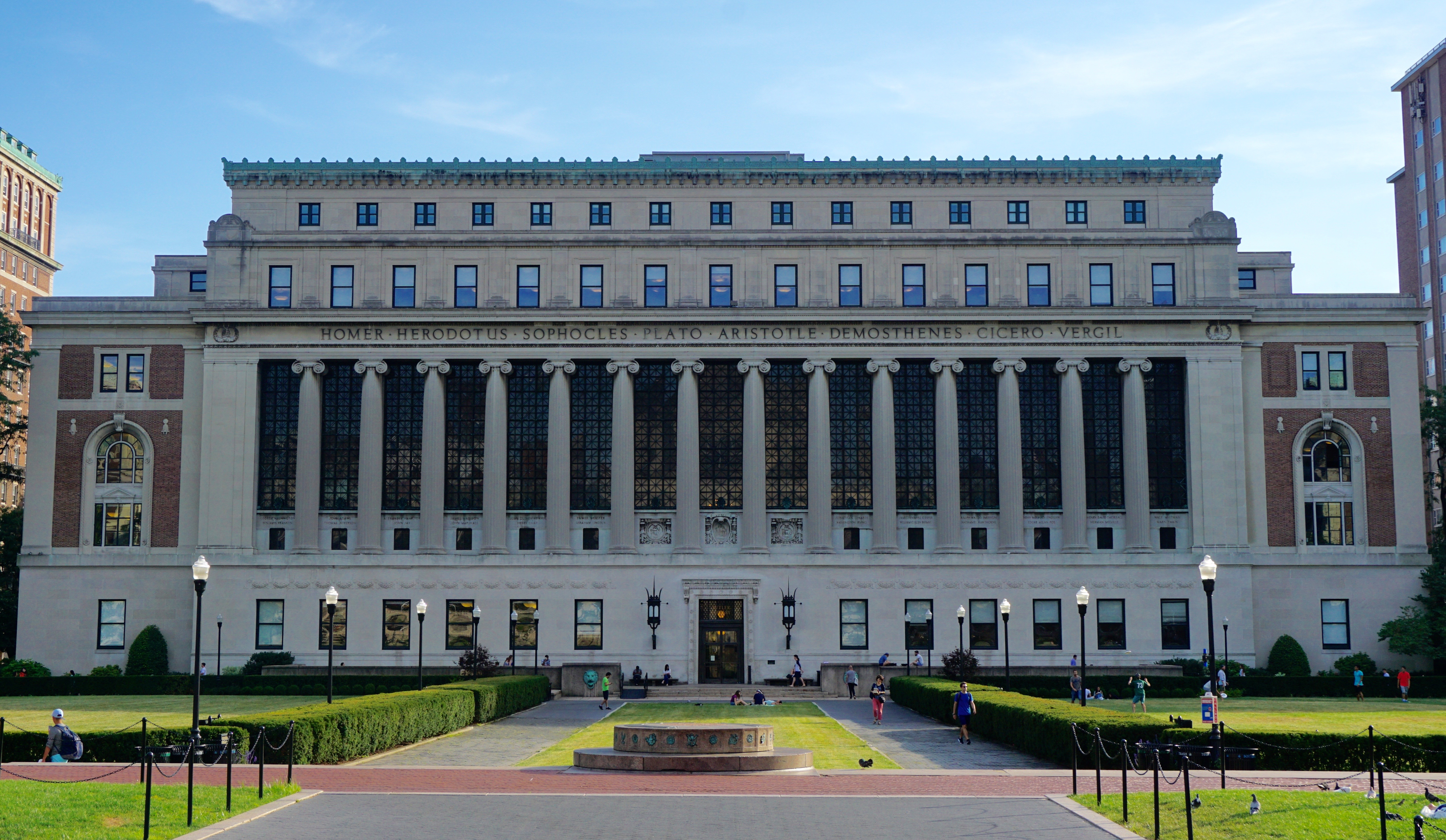
Butler Library on the campus of Columbia University

114th Street marks the southern boundary of Columbia University's Morningside Heights Campus and is the location of Butler Library, which is the university's largest.

Above 114th Street between Amsterdam Avenue and Morningside Drive, there is a private indoor pedestrian bridge connecting two buildings on the campus of Mount Sinai Morningside.

=== 120th Street ===
120th Street (40.8076°N 73.9549°W) traverses the neighborhoods of Morningside Heights, Harlem, and Spanish Harlem. It begins on Riverside Drive at the Interchurch Center. It then runs east between the campuses of Barnard College and the Union Theological Seminary, then crosses Broadway and runs between the campuses of Columbia University and Teacher's College. The street is interrupted by Morningside Park. It then continues east, eventually running along the southern edge of Marcus Garvey Park, passing by 58 West, the former residence of Maya Angelou. It then continues through Spanish Harlem; when it crosses Pleasant Avenue it becomes a two‑way street and continues nearly to the East River, where for automobiles, it turns north and becomes Paladino Avenue, and for pedestrians, continues as a bridge across FDR Drive.

=== 122nd Street ===
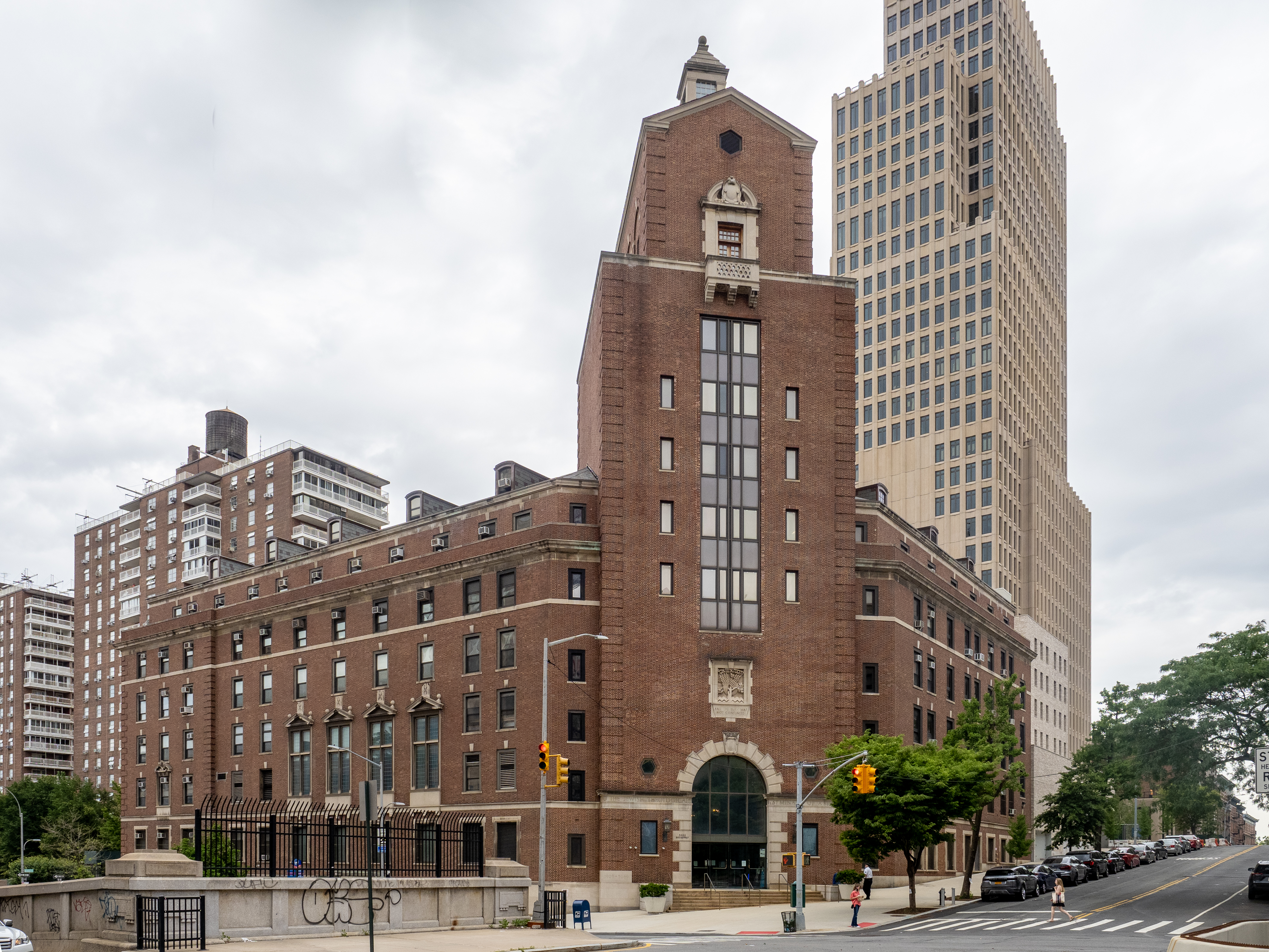
Jewish Theological Seminary

122nd Street (40.8088°N 73.9540°W) is divided into three noncontiguous segments, E 122nd Street, W 122nd Street, and W 122nd Street Seminary Row, by Marcus Garvey Memorial Park and Morningside Park.

E 122nd Street runs four blocks (2,250 feet (690 m)) west from the intersection of Second Avenue and terminates at the intersection of Madison Avenue at Marcus Garvey Memorial Park. This segment runs in East Harlem and crosses portions of Third Avenue, Lexington, and Park (Fourth Avenue).

W 122nd Street runs six blocks (3,280 feet (1,000 m)) west from the intersection of Mount Morris Park West at Marcus Garvey Memorial Park and terminates at the intersection of Morningside Avenue at Morningside Park. This segment runs in the Mount Morris Historical District and crosses portions of Lenox Avenue (Sixth Avenue), Seventh Avenue, Frederick Douglass Boulevard (Eighth Avenue), and Manhattan Avenue.

W 122nd Street Seminary Row runs three blocks (1,500 feet (460 m)) west from the intersection of Amsterdam Avenue (Tenth Avenue) and terminates at the intersection of Riverside Drive. East of Amsterdam, Seminary Row bends south along Morningside Park and is resigned as Morningside Drive (Ninth Avenue). Seminary row runs in Morningside Heights, the district surrounding Columbia University, and crosses portions of Broadway and Claremont Avenue.

Seminary Row is named for the Union Theological Seminary and the Jewish Theological Seminary which it touches. Seminary Row also runs by the Manhattan School of Music, Riverside Church, Sakura Park, Grant's Tomb, and Morningside Park.

122nd Street is mentioned in the movie Taxi Driver by main character Travis Bickle as the location where a fellow cab driver is assaulted with a knife. The street and the surrounding neighborhood of Harlem is then referred to as "Mau Mau Land" by another character named Wizard, slang indicating it is a majority black area.

=== 125th Street ===
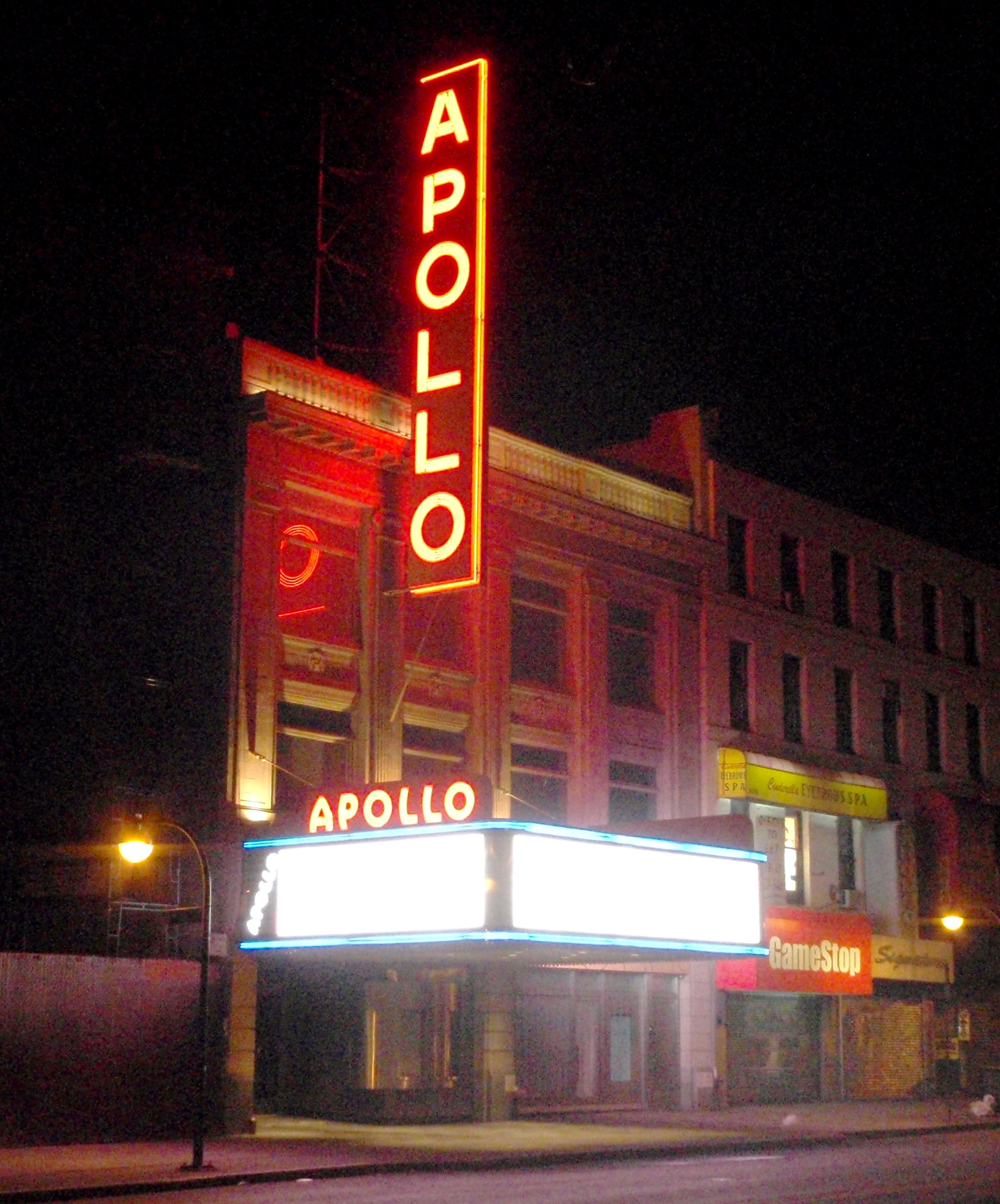
The Apollo Theater

==== La Salle Street ====
La Salle Street (40.813°N 73.9575°W) is a street in West Harlem that runs just two blocks between Amsterdam Avenue and Claremont Avenue. West of Convent Avenue, 125th Street was re-routed onto the old Manhattan Avenue. The original 125th Street west of Convent Avenue was swallowed up to make the superblocks where the low income housing projects now exist. La Salle Street is the only vestige of the original routing.

=== 126th Street ===
17 East 126th Street was the location of Art Kane's 1958 photograph of contemporary jazz musicians, now known as A Great Day in Harlem, which featured in the 2004 Steven Spielberg film The Terminal.

=== 127th Street ===
Public School 154 "Harriet Tubman" and Public School 157

=== 132nd Street ===
132nd Street (40.814583°N 73.947944°W) runs east–west above Central Park and is located in Harlem just south of Hamilton Heights. The main portion of 132nd Street runs eastbound from Frederick Douglass Boulevard to the northern end of Park Avenue, where there is a southbound exit from/entrance to the Harlem River Drive. After an interruption from St. Nicholas Park and City College, there is another small stretch of West 132nd Street between Broadway and Twelfth Avenue

The 132nd Street Community Garden is located on 132nd Street between Adam Clayton Powell Jr. Boulevard and Malcolm X Boulevard. In 1997, the lot received a garden makeover; the Borough President's office funded the installation of a $100,000 water distribution system that keeps the wide variety of trees green. The garden also holds a goldfish pond and several benches. The spirit of the neighborhood lives in gardens like this one, planted and tended by local residents.

The Manhattanville Bus Depot (formerly known as the 132nd Street Bus Depot) is located on West 132nd and 133rd Street between Broadway and Riverside Drive in the Manhattanville neighborhood.

=== 135th Street ===
Two subway stations:

- 135th Street on the IND Eighth Avenue Line (A, B, and C trains) at St. Nicholas Avenue
- 135th Street on the IRT Lenox Avenue Line (2 and 3 trains) at Lenox Avenue

Four bus routes:

- The Bx33 is the main server, running between Saint Nicholas Avenue and the Madison Avenue Bridge.
- The M11 runs between Riverside Drive and Amsterdam Avenue.
- The M5 runs between Riverside Drive and Broadway.
- The uptown M1 runs from Madison to Fifth Avenues.

=== 137th Street ===
One local subway station:

- 137th Street on the IRT Broadway–Seventh Avenue Line (1 train) at Broadway

=== 148th Street ===
One subway terminal:

- 148th Street on the IRT Lenox Avenue Line (3 train) at Adam Clayton Powell Jr. Boulevard

=== 155th Street ===
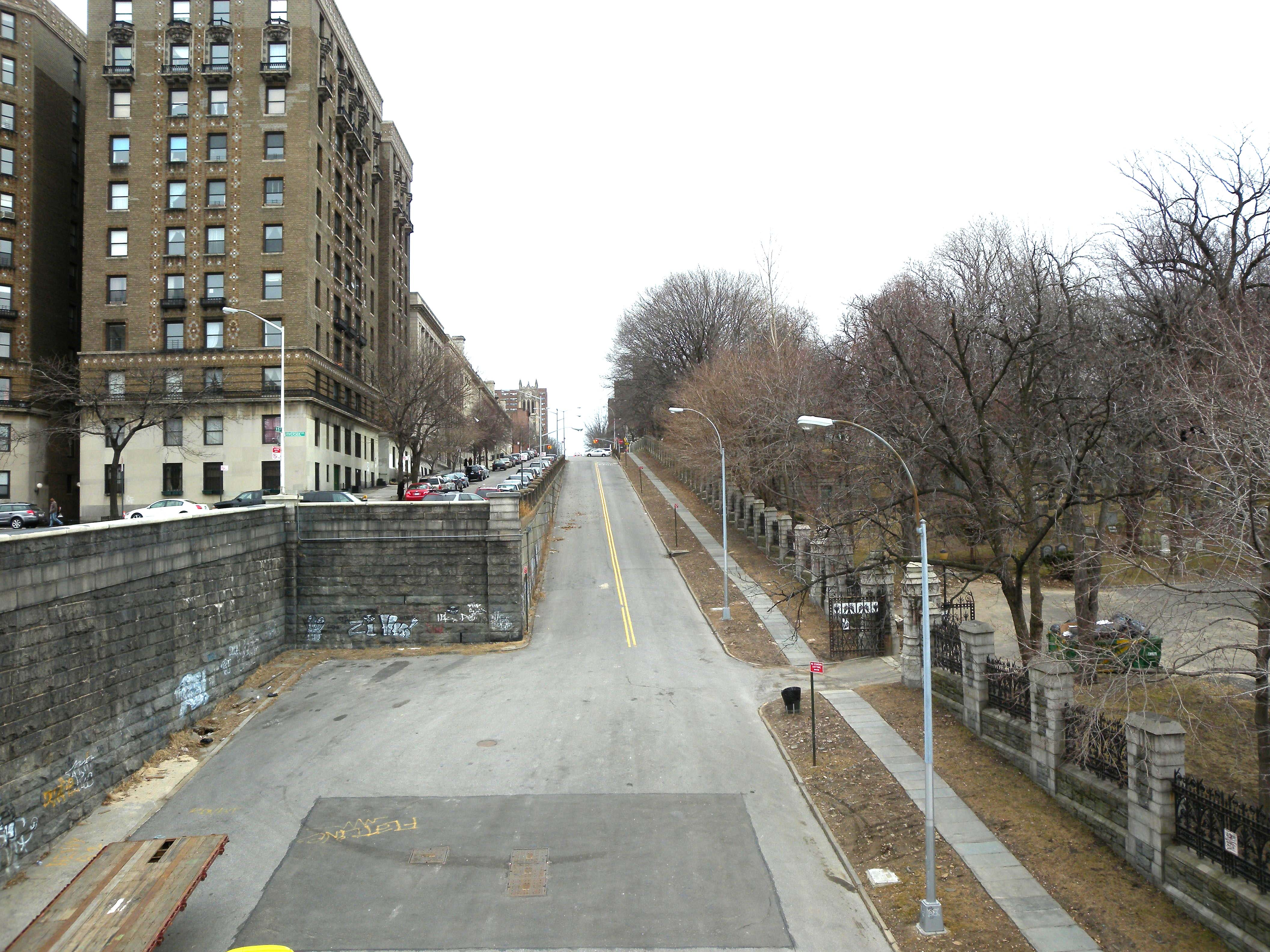
West end of 155th Street

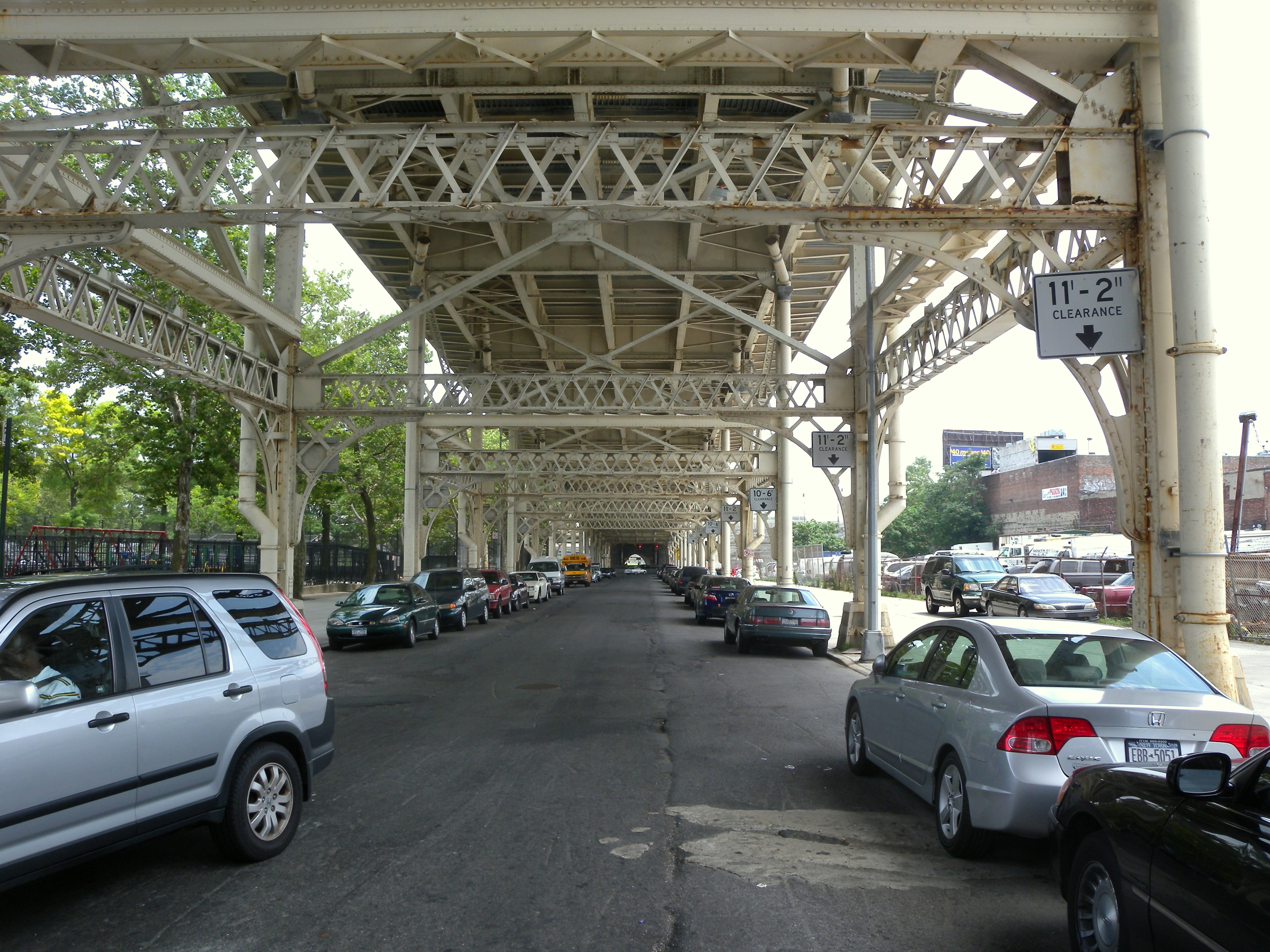
Underneath; unconnected

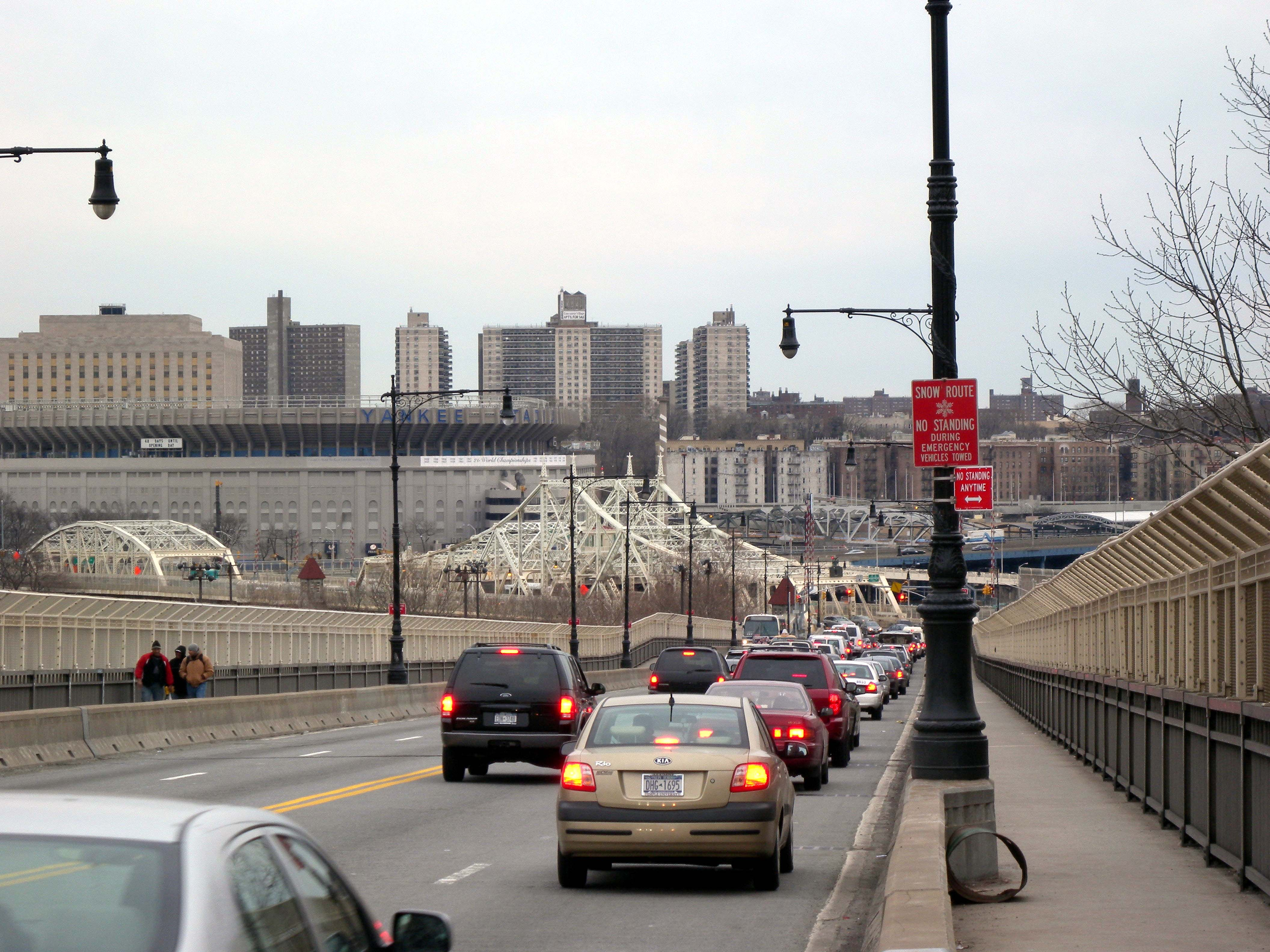
Eastern viaduct

155th Street is a major crosstown street considered to form the boundary between Harlem and Washington Heights. It is the northernmost of the 155 crosstown streets mapped out in the Commissioner's Plan of 1811 that established the numbered street grid in Manhattan.

155th Street starts on the West Side at Riverside Drive, crossing Broadway, Amsterdam Avenue and St. Nicholas Avenue. At St. Nicholas Place, the terrain drops off steeply, and 155th Street is carried on a 1,600-foot (490 m) long viaduct, a City Landmark constructed in 1893, that slopes down towards the Harlem River, continuing onto the Macombs Dam Bridge, crossing over (but not intersecting with) the Harlem River Drive. A separate, unconnected section of 155th Street runs under the viaduct, connecting Bradhurst Avenue and the Harlem River Drive.

The New York City Subway serves 155th Street on the IND Eighth Avenue and Concourse Lines. Notable points include:

- Highbridge Park, situated on the banks of the Harlem River near the northernmost tip of Manhattan, between 155th Street and Dyckman Street.
- Polo Grounds, the final incarnation of the famed stadium was located at was then Eighth Avenue from 1911 to 1963. Over its life, it was home of the New York Giants (1911–1957), New York Yankees (1913–1922) and New York Mets (1962–1963) baseball franchises, and the New York Giants (1925–1955) and New York Jets (1960–1963) football teams.
- Rucker Park, located at Frederick Douglass Boulevard, Rucker Park is one of the premier havens of streetball, and its summer league has been the launching point for many NBA players.
- Hispanic Society of America, Museum of Spanish, Portuguese, and Latin American art and artifacts, as well as a rare books and manuscripts and research library, located at Audubon Terrace.
- Trinity Church Cemetery and Mausoleum, on the south side of 155th between Broadway and Riverside Drive.

=== 157th Street ===
One local subway station:

- 157th Street on the IRT Broadway–Seventh Avenue Line (1 train) at Broadway
- The Duke Ellington House is located at 157th Street and St. Nicholas Avenue.

=== 163rd Street ===
One local subway station:

- 163rd Street on the IND Eighth Avenue Line (A and C trains) at St. Nicholas Avenue and Amsterdam Avenue

=== 168th Street ===
A station complex with platforms for two subway lines:

- 168th Street on the IRT Broadway–Seventh Avenue Line (1 train) at Broadway
- 168th Street on the IND Eighth Avenue Line (A and C trains) at St. Nicholas Avenue

=== 175th Street ===
One local subway station:

- 175th Street on the IND Eighth Avenue Line (A train) at Fort Washington Avenue

=== 181st Street ===
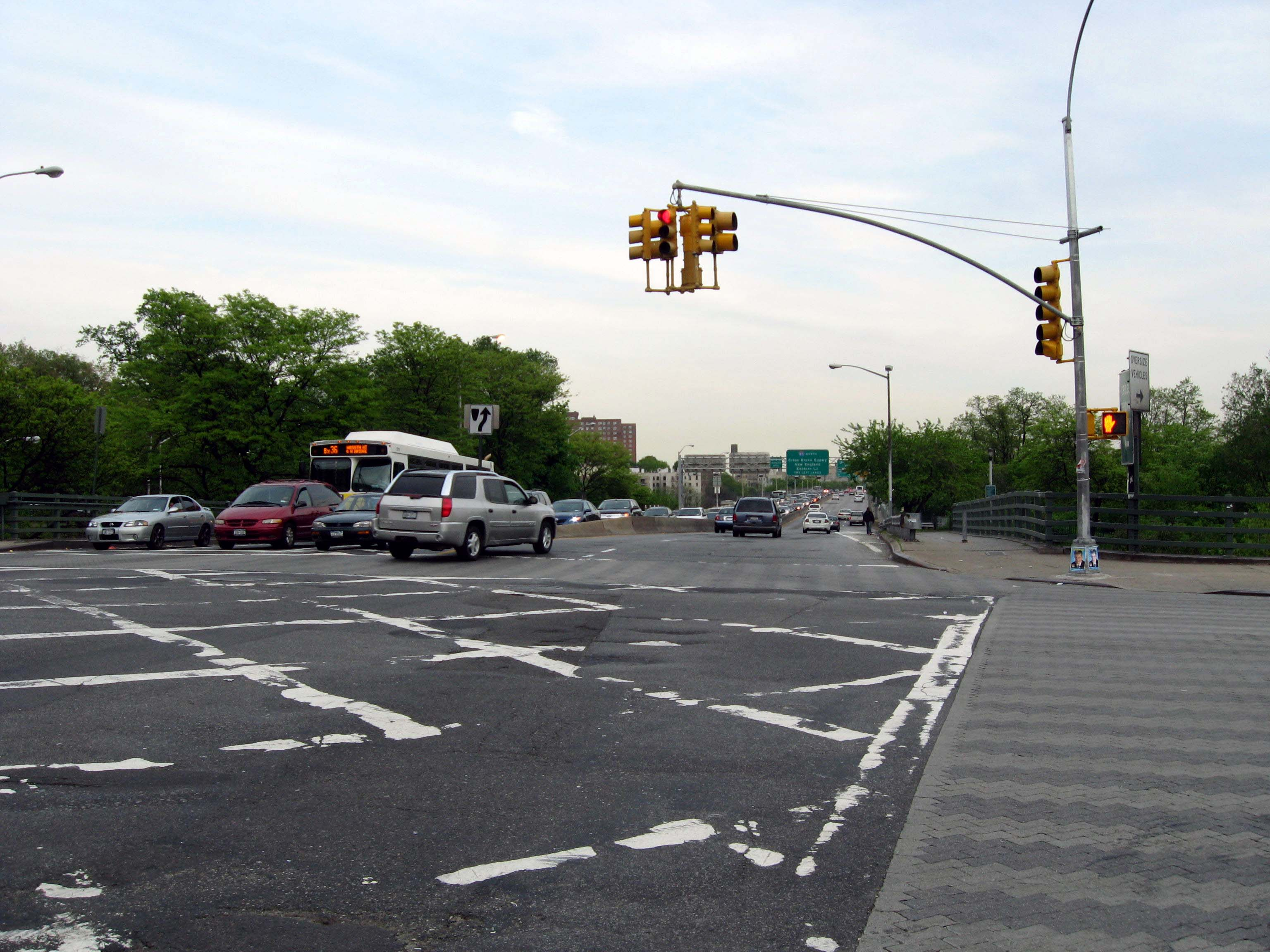
East end of 181st Street

181st Street (40°50′50″N 73°55′44″W) is a major thoroughfare running through the Washington Heights neighborhood. It runs from the Washington Bridge in the east, to the Henry Hudson Parkway in the west, near the George Washington Bridge and the Hudson River. The west end is called Plaza Lafayette.

West of Fort Washington Avenue, 181st Street is largely residential, bordering Hudson Heights and having a few shops to serve the local residents. East of Fort Washington Avenue, the street becomes increasingly commercial, becoming dominated entirely by retail stores where the street reaches Broadway and continues as such until reaching the Harlem River. It is the area's major shopping district.

181st Street is served by two New York City Subway lines; there is a 181st Street station at Fort Washington Avenue on the IND Eighth Avenue Line (A train) and a 181st Street station at St. Nicholas Avenue on the IRT Broadway–Seventh Avenue Line (1 train). The stations are about 500 metres (550 yd) from each other and are not connected. The George Washington Bridge Bus Terminal is a couple of blocks south on Fort Washington Avenue. 181st Street is also the last south/west exit in New York on the Trans-Manhattan Expressway (I-95), just before crossing the George Washington Bridge to New Jersey.

=== 187th Street ===
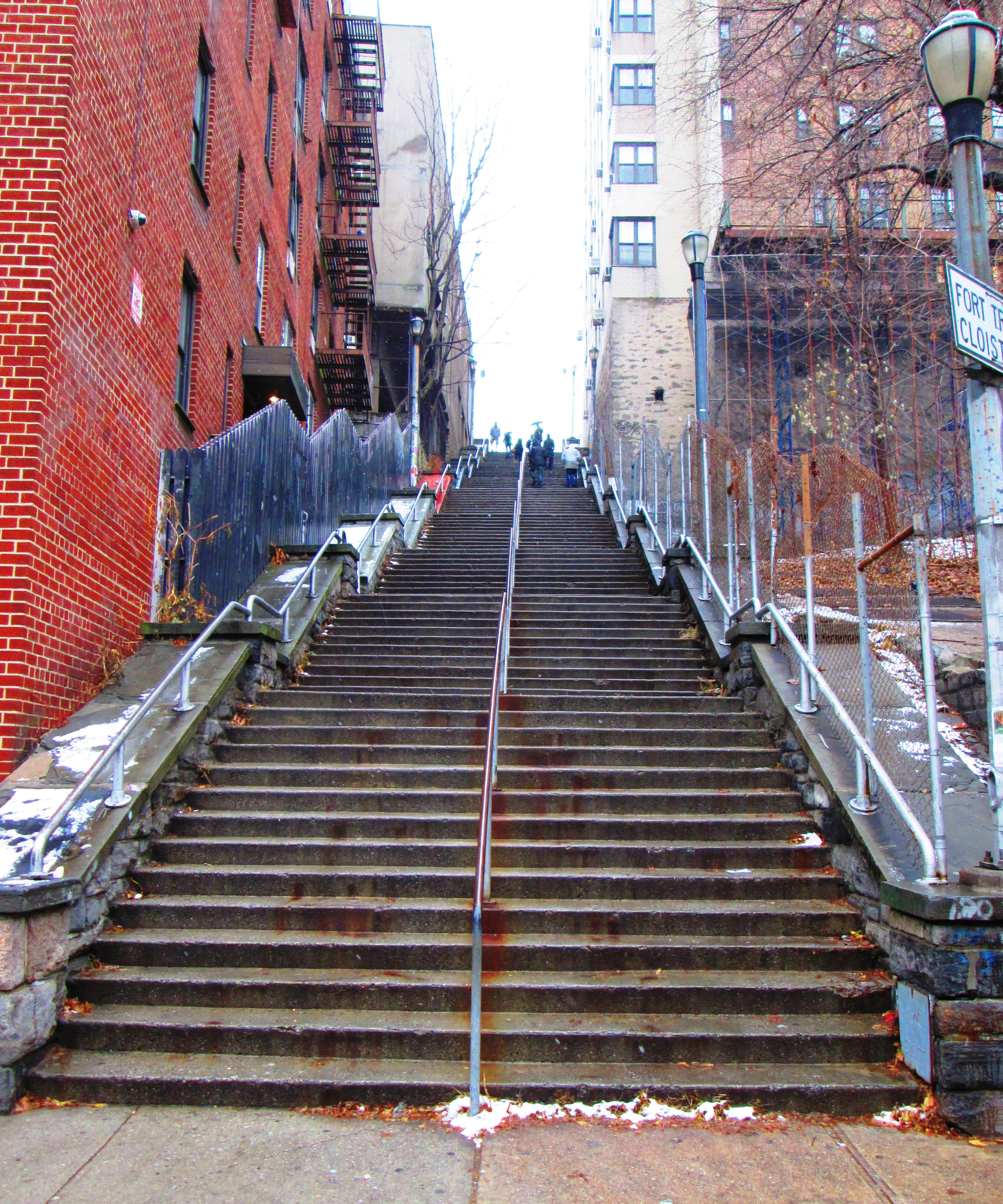
West 187th Street stairs to Ft. Washington Avenue

187th Street crosses Washington Heights, running from Laurel Hill Terrace in the east to Chittenden Avenue in the west near the George Washington Bridge and overlooking the West Side Highway and the Hudson River. The street is interrupted by a long set of stairs between Overlook Terrace in the Broadway valley and Fort Washington Avenue. West of the stairs is a one-block shopping street serving the Hudson Heights neighborhood.

187th Street intersects with, from east to west, Laurel Hill Terrace, Amsterdam Avenue, Audubon Avenue, St. Nicholas Avenue, Wadsworth Avenue, Broadway, Bennett Avenue, Overlook Terrace, Fort Washington Avenue, Pinehurst Avenue, Cabrini Boulevard and Chittenden Avenue.

The many institutions on 187th Street include Mount Sinai Jewish Center, the Dombrov Shtiebel, and the uptown campus of Yeshiva University. The local public elementary and middle school P.S./M.S. 187 is located on Cabrini Boulevard, just north of 187th Street.

=== 190th Street ===
One local subway station:

- 190th Street on the IND Eighth Avenue Line (A train) at Fort Washington Avenue

=== 191st Street ===
One local subway station:

- 191st Street on the IRT Broadway–Seventh Avenue Line (1 train) at St. Nicholas Avenue

=== 194th to 200th streets ===
Manhattan has no streets numbered 194th, 195th, 197th, 198th, 199th, or 200th. The Dyckman Street station was formerly called "Dyckman Street–200th Street", but there has never been a street in Manhattan with that number.

=== 196th Street ===
A 196th Street does exist, between Broadway and Ellwood Street. It is the only street between what would be 193rd and 201st to have numbered signage.

=== 207th Street ===
Two local subway stations:

- 207th Street terminal on the IND Eighth Avenue Line (A train) at Broadway
- 207th Street on the IRT Broadway–Seventh Avenue Line (1 train) at Tenth Avenue

The University Heights Bridge, a swing bridge across the Harlem River, connects the street with Fordham Road in the Bronx.

=== 208th to 210th streets ===
While 208th Street exists as a small driveway and parking lot located just south of the 207th Street Yard, Manhattan has no streets numbered 209th or 210th.

=== 215th Street ===
One local subway station:

- 215th Street on the IRT Broadway–Seventh Avenue Line (1 train) at Tenth Avenue

=== 221st to 224th streets ===
Manhattan has no streets numbered 221st, 222nd, 223rd, or 224th, as their theoretical location is taken up by the Spuyten Duyvil Creek.

=== 225th Street ===
One local subway station:

- Marble Hill–225th Street on the IRT Broadway–Seventh Avenue Line (1 train) at Broadway

=== 226th Street ===
Despite having streets numbered 225th, 227th and 228th in the Marble Hill neighborhood, Manhattan has no street numbered 226th.

=== 228th Street ===
228th Street, located in the Marble Hill neighborhood, is the highest numbered street in Manhattan. The street numbers continue in The Bronx.

== See also ==
- List of eponymous streets in New York City
- Manhattan address algorithm
