= 191st Street station =

New York City Subway station in Manhattan

191 Street
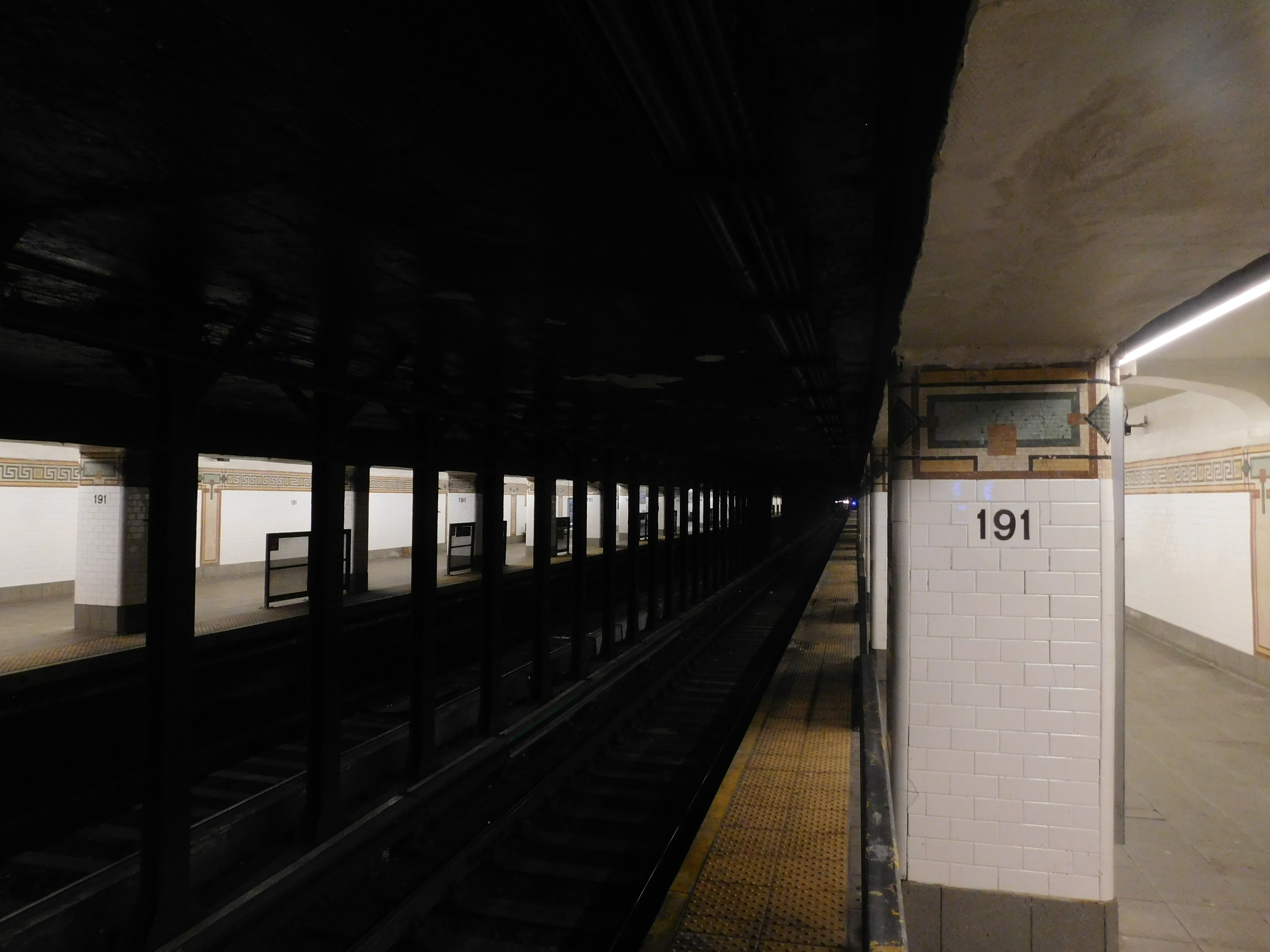
- View of the downtown platform with a 1 train arriving in the distance.

Station statistics
- Address: West 191st Street & Saint Nicholas Avenue; New York, New York
- Borough: Manhattan
- Locale: Washington Heights
- Coordinates: 40.855°N 73.929°W
- Division: A (IRT)
- Line: IRT Broadway–Seventh Avenue Line
- Services: 1 (all times)
- Transit: NYCT Bus: M3, M101
- Structure: Underground
- Depth: 173 feet (53 m)
- Platforms: 2 side platforms
- Tracks: 2

Other information
- Opened: January 14, 1911 (115 years ago)
- Accessible: Partially; access to mezzanine only, access to platforms planned

Traffic
- 2025: 1,731,755 ▲8.7%
- Rank: 205 out of 423
Services
Preceding station	New York City Subway	Following station
Dyckman Street toward Van Cortlandt Park–242nd Street	1 (New York City Subway service)	181st Street toward South Ferry
Location
Location within New York City Subway
Location within New York City
Location within New York
Track layout
Street map
Station service legend
Symbol	Description
Stops all times	Stops all times

The 191st Street station is a station on the IRT Broadway–Seventh Avenue Line of the New York City Subway. Located at the intersection of St. Nicholas Avenue and 191st Street in the Washington Heights neighborhood of Manhattan, it is served by the 1 train at all times. It is the deepest station in the New York City Subway system at about 173 feet (53 m) below street level. Access to the station's main entrance is only provided by four elevators from the mezzanine situated above the platforms. Tunnel Street, a 1,000-foot-long (300 m) pedestrian tunnel, also extends west from the station to Broadway, connecting it with the Fort George neighborhood.

Built by the Interborough Rapid Transit Company (IRT), the station opened on January 14, 1911, as an infill station along the first subway. Even though the line through the area had opened five years earlier, no station was constructed at this location because the surrounding neighborhood had a lower population than other areas of Manhattan. Before the opening of the pedestrian tunnel two years later, the area's hilly topography made it hard for area residents to access the station. The opening of the station and the tunnel led to the development of the surrounding area, including the construction of apartment buildings. Hundreds of lots held by the Bennett family since 1835 were sold at an auction in 1919. These provided additional housing opportunities for the middle class, taking advantage of the area's improved transportation access.

== History ==
=== Construction ===
Planning for a subway line in New York City dates to 1864, but development of what became the city's first subway line did not start until 1894, when the New York State Legislature passed the Rapid Transit Act. The subway plans were drawn up by a team of engineers led by William Barclay Parsons, the Rapid Transit Commission's chief engineer. It called for a subway line from New York City Hall in lower Manhattan to the Upper West Side, where two branches would lead north into the Bronx. A plan was formally adopted in 1897, and all legal conflicts over the route alignment were resolved near the end of 1899.

The Rapid Transit Construction Company, organized by John B. McDonald and funded by August Belmont Jr., signed the initial Contract 1 with the Rapid Transit Commission in February 1900, under which it would construct the subway and maintain a 50-year operating lease from the opening of the line. In 1901, the firm of Heins & LaFarge was hired to design the underground stations. Belmont incorporated the Interborough Rapid Transit Company (IRT) in April 1902 to operate the subway.

The tunnel leading to what would become the 191st Street station was built as part of the IRT's West Side Line (now the Broadway–Seventh Avenue Line) from a point 100 feet (30 m) north of 182nd Street to Hillside Avenue. Work on this section was conducted by L. B. McCabe & Brother, who started building the tunnel segment on March 27, 1901. The 168th Street, 181st Street, and 191st Street stations were built as part of the Washington Heights Mine Tunnel (also known as the Fort George Tunnel), which stretches for over 2 miles (3.2 km). The tunnel was dug through the hard rock under Washington Heights, with work proceeding from either end as well as from construction shafts at 168th and 181st Streets.

==== Station ====
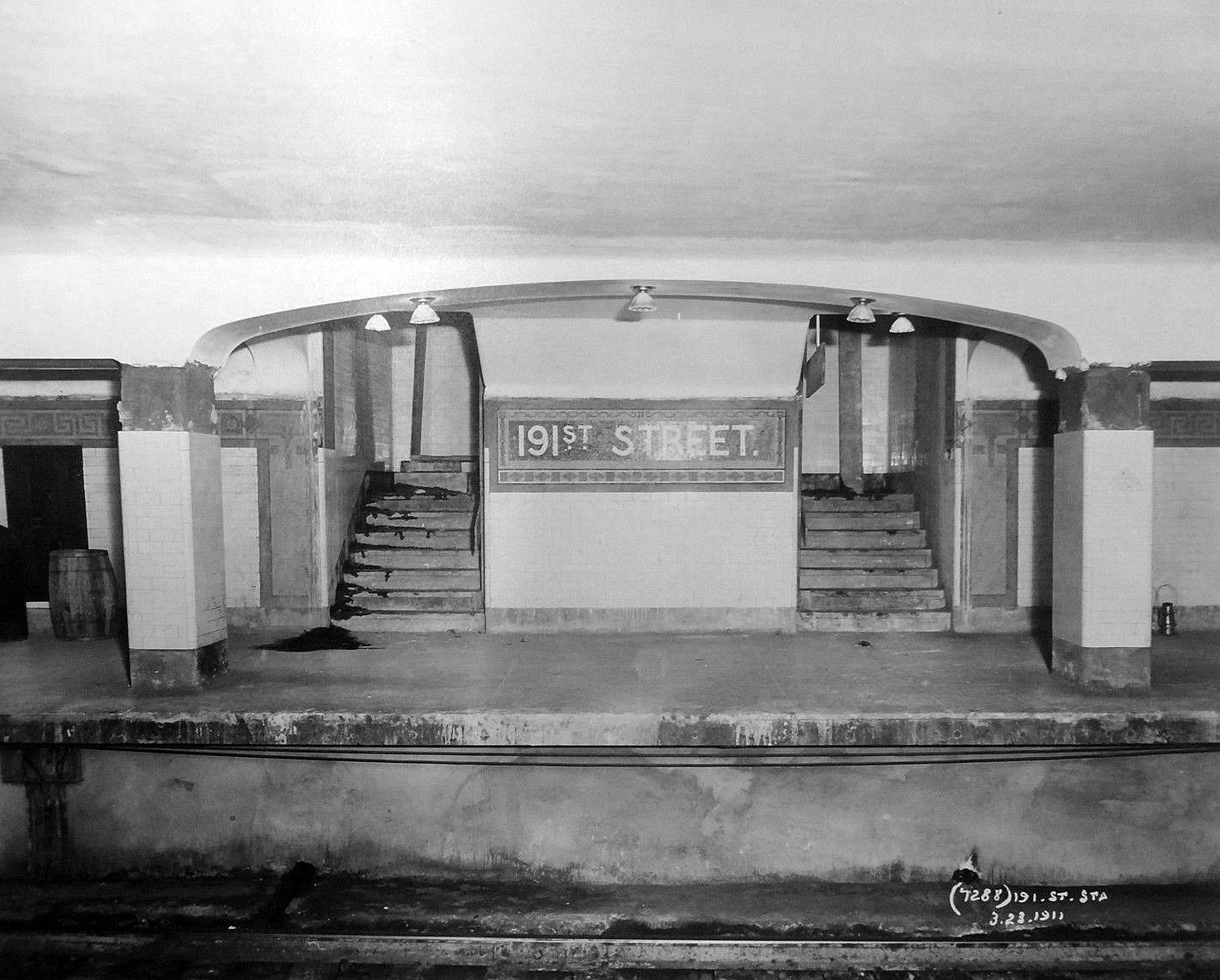
The station shortly after opening in 1911

The West Side Branch was extended northward from 157th Street to a temporary terminus at 221st Street and Broadway on March 12, 1906. There was no station at 191st Street. With the construction of the line, the population in Washington Heights grew rapidly. It was determined that a station should be built at 191st Street to bridge the 4,802-foot (1,464 m) gap between the 181st Street and Dyckman Street stations, which had become overcrowded. A station had not been deemed necessary as this area of Manhattan was less densely populated, and it was thought that there was no need to have stations as close together as they were downtown.

The opening of the station was expected to spur development in the Fort George area. Its original sponsor was David Stewart. He and other property owners had pushed for the station's construction seeking better accessibility to their land. Following the announcement of the station's construction, and before it began, interest in nearby real estate, having been nonexistent in the previous two years, increased.

Construction of the station began on July 20, 1909. Work on new shafts began on August 18, 1909, after legal and engineering difficulties were straightened out in the previous months. Preliminary work involved the clearing of a site in a vacant lot south of 191st Street on the west side of St. Nicholas Avenue for a shaft 177 feet (54 metres) deep. More than 20,000 cubic yards (15,000 cubic metres) of rock was blasted and removed from the shaft. It was designed to accommodate four elevators and a steel emergency staircase from the surface to platform level. The four elevator wells were in the four corners of the main shaft with the staircase between them. The emergency staircase, along with those at the 168th Street and 181st Street stations, whose platforms were also accessed mainly by elevators, were used for the first time on March 23, 1914, after the elevators stopped working due to a problem at the Dyckman power station. This resulted in extreme congestion.

Construction of the station proved difficult. It required the sinking of a shaft and the widening of the tunnel bore on both sides to accommodate the platforms; this was accomplished without interrupting subway service. The station platforms were constructed by building two new tunnels alongside the existing tunnel, and connecting them once the platforms were complete. Blasting for the station was limited to between midnight and 5:00 a.m. when subway service was less frequent. The station platforms were designed to be 480 feet (150 m) long to accommodate 10-car express trains. Originally, part of the old tunnel arch was to be used for the station roof. However, the discovery of a mud seam, and the development of cracks in the roof, made it necessary to build a flat roof over the tracks, and filling in the space between the arch and the roof with concrete.

==== Pedestrian tunnel ====
Along with the construction of the station, a 1,000-foot-long (300 m) tunnel was built to connect the station at 191st Street and St. Nicholas Avenue with Broadway, located 59 feet (18 m) west of Fairview Avenue. James A. Lynch, counsel for many subway contractors, recommended the construction of a tunnel street to provide better access to the station, and convinced local property owners and the city to fund it. The tunnel street cost $76,000, with $5,000 provided by the IRT and the remainder levied on the neighborhood property owners at their request. Engineers found the construction of the tunnel to be feasible since the subway platforms would be on almost the same level as Broadway.

On October 5, 1909, the Board of Improvements of Washington Heights approved plans for the construction of a 1,900-foot-long (580 m) tunnel to Riverside Drive. Three entrances to the tunnel were proposed at Broadway, Fort Washington Avenue, and Riverside Drive. The entrances to Broadway and Riverside Drive would have been located at street-level, as the tunnel was to be at the same elevation as the streets at these locations. Two elevators would be required for the entrance to Fort Washington Avenue, which was located at a higher elevation. The tunnel would have been bored from both sides, and was expected to be completed within 14 months.

Since the tunnel was to be located underneath private property, easements had to be obtained to allow for its construction. They were acquired in a proceeding under a provision of the City Charter, not under the terms of the Rapid Transit Act. In June 1910, the local board of directors sent a resolution calling for the construction of the street tunnel to the New York City Board of Estimate (NYCBOE). At the time, funding had been acquired for slightly more than half the length of the tunnel, with the remainder expected to be secured by easements. The NYCBOE approved the petition for the improvement and agreed to hold a public hearing on December 29, 1910. Unlike other streets in the city, easements were only acquired to a height of 14 feet (4.3 m) above the tunnel. In January, construction was expected to begin that summer. The contract for the underground street was let on September 9, 1911, and was awarded to the Bell-Ross Contracting Company, headed by Roswell D. Williams, on September 25. The company was given a year to finish the work, but expected to complete it in nine months. In October 1911, construction of the tunnel was expected to be completed on April 1, 1912; construction began in January 1912.

In December 1911, the local Board of Improvements authorized plans to extend the tunnel west at grade across Broadway and Bennett Avenue and to tunnel to a point underneath Fort Washington Avenue, the highest point in Manhattan, where elevators would take passengers to the surface. An extension of the tunnel was expected to lead quickly to development in the area. As such, an extension was discussed and questions were raised concerning which agency would operate the elevators. In June 1912, blasting on the tunnel was completed, with its expected opening date being September 1912. To cut down the danger of accidents, the contractors sank a shaft halfway up the hill and tunneled east to the subway station and west to Broadway.

The tunnel opened on March 8, 1913. At a ceremony for the tunnel's opening, Manhattan Borough President George McAneny, Commissioner Williams of the Public Service Commission and other officials unanimously allowed the street to be named Tunnel Street. The tunnel was also intended to be used as an easy way for pedestrians to get to St. Nicholas Avenue at the top of the hill; pedestrians were allowed to use the elevators free of charge. A new ticket booth opened on May 18, 1913. On December 31, 1913, the Appellate Division of the New York Supreme Court issued a decision denying a revision to the awards made for the easements for the tunnel's construction. Since it was very windy at both entrances to the tunnel, storm doors were later installed at either end of the tunnel.

At its connection to the subway station elevator, it is 225 feet (69 m) below the surface. The tunnel was built underneath a steep hill to save people a walk of one-quarter to one-third of a mile (0.40 to 0.54 km) and a steep climb. Before the tunnel opened, riders used circuitous routes to get to either the Dyckman Street or 181st Street stations. The tunnel provided better access westward to the Hudson River in the valley between 187th Street and Nagle Avenue. The tunnel was built to be 12 feet (3.7 m) wide and 12 feet (3.7 m) high in the center, with 6 feet (1.8 m) sides, and an arched roof with a radius of 6 feet (1.8 m). The tunnel was built of concrete reinforced with steel, and excavated through solid rock, except for 173 feet (53 m) at the street end of the tunnel, which was built as a roofed-over cut. The tunnel's construction was expected to increase development in this area of Manhattan as the difficult terrain would no longer be a deterrent. The underground street remains the only one of its kind in Manhattan. The tunnel was lined with glazed tile, lit for its entire length, and guarded at all times. It had a stationary post where a policeman was always on duty. Policemen were stationed at either end of the tunnel. The tunnel's grade from the steps at the Broadway entrance to the subway platform is one percent to allow water used in cleaning that collects around the walls to drain through a sewer to the subway. The difference in elevation between the tunnel's two ends is 9.5 feet (2.9 m).

The approach to the entrance through the building at the southwest corner of 191st Street and St. Nicholas Avenue was rebuilt by the Morgenthau Realty Company in conjunction with the construction of a building at this location. In November 1916, work on rebuilding the station entrance was completed.

=== Opening and early years ===
As of June 1910, the station was expected to open in the coming fall. Work on the station was 65 percent complete as of that month. On July 18, 1910, several tons of rail fell through the roof of the tunnel onto the northbound track after an overcharge of powder was set off, nearly seriously injuring a dozen workers. The accident delayed service for two hours. Although not fully completed, the 191st Street station opened to the public on January 14, 1911. The ticket booths, which were to be in vestibules at street level, had not been finished, and temporary booths for the sale of tickets were built and put in the mezzanine. A special train with guests, including top IRT officials and Henry Morgenthau, ran from 137th Street to the station. Initially, the station was served by West Side local and express trains. Express trains began at South Ferry in Manhattan or Atlantic Avenue in Brooklyn, and ended at 242nd Street in the Bronx. Local trains ran from City Hall to 242nd Street during rush hours, continuing south from City Hall to South Ferry at other times. In 1918, the Broadway–Seventh Avenue Line opened south of Times Square–42nd Street, and the original line was divided into an H-shaped system. The original West Side Line thus became part of the Broadway–Seventh Avenue Line. Local trains were sent to South Ferry, while express trains used the new Clark Street Tunnel to Brooklyn.

By the time the station opened, several apartment buildings had been completed, though some lots still remained available for development. In the words of The New York Times, "prior to the opening of the 191st Street subway station ... no high-class residential building was to be found north of 187th Street." The newspaper expected the Fort George area to become one of the "choicest" apartment areas of the city.

In January and February 1912, work was completed on the station finish, and a small amount of work was done toward the completion of the elevators. Construction of the station cost $381,000 and was done as a modification to Contract 1 between New York City and the IRT for the construction of the first subway. Space for four elevators in one shaft was included in the station going down to the mezzanine, however, only two of the elevators were installed. The remaining elevators were to be added once ridership at the station justified it. These elevators rise to the surface on a plot given to the city by the Henry Morgenthau Company. The elevators were lent out to one of the company's buildings, which was completed at the end of 1916. The Henry Morgenthau Company was involved in real estate development and had profited from the increasing value land around the station. In 1915, the station's users complained to the IRT about elevator service, noting there was often a five, six and sometimes a ten-minute wait for an elevator. At the time, except during a few hours at night and in the early morning, there was only one elevator operator.

Within a year after the station opened, the walls were black and stained, ironwork was covered in rust, and portions of cement in the walls and ceiling had crumbled away due to water damage. The rock-bed above the station consisted of clay and shale, which allowed surface water to seep into the station. A similar problem occurred at the 181st Street station, and it took time to fix the leaks and waterproof that station. Drains were installed in this station and leaks were made watertight. These temporary fixes were made until the city's construction of the pedestrian tunnel was completed. On January 3, 1912, IRT officials hinted that if the problems could not be fixed, the station would be eliminated. The problems were eventually fixed.

On June 10, 1919, 500 lots in Washington Heights owned by the Bennett family since 1835 were sold to the highest bidder. The land sale was expected to provide additional housing opportunities for the middle class. The construction of a new station in between the 181st Street and 191st Street stations, similar to the construction of the 191st Street station, with entrances at 186th Street and 187th Street, was expected to relieve projected overcrowding at those two stops. It would also serve the development of the Broadway block, bounded by Broadway, Bennett Avenue, and 187th Street, that was owned by the Bennett Family. A tunnel would have connected the deep station to Riverside Drive and Fort Washington Avenue. The construction of the stop was considered a "practical certainty."

On August 13, 1925, the New York City Board of Transportation (NYCBOT) announced two additional elevators would be added to the station as ridership had increased with the opening of the George Washington High School. It opened in February 1925, adding 3,500 more daily passengers to those already using the station. The elevators at the stop handled 2,001 passengers a day in 1915, increasing by 200 percent to 5,187 in 1925. Bids for the project were received on August 28, with construction expected to be completed eight months after the contract was awarded. On October 14, 1925, the $107,865 contract was awarded to the Otis Elevator Company; the bid was the only one received. The NYCBOT found that other firms did not compete in the bidding as they were unable to meet the requirement that elevators be equipped with floor leveling safety devices. The elevators opened on September 16, 1926, coinciding with the start of classes at George Washington High School. Their installation required additional power supply.

=== Mid- and late 20th century ===
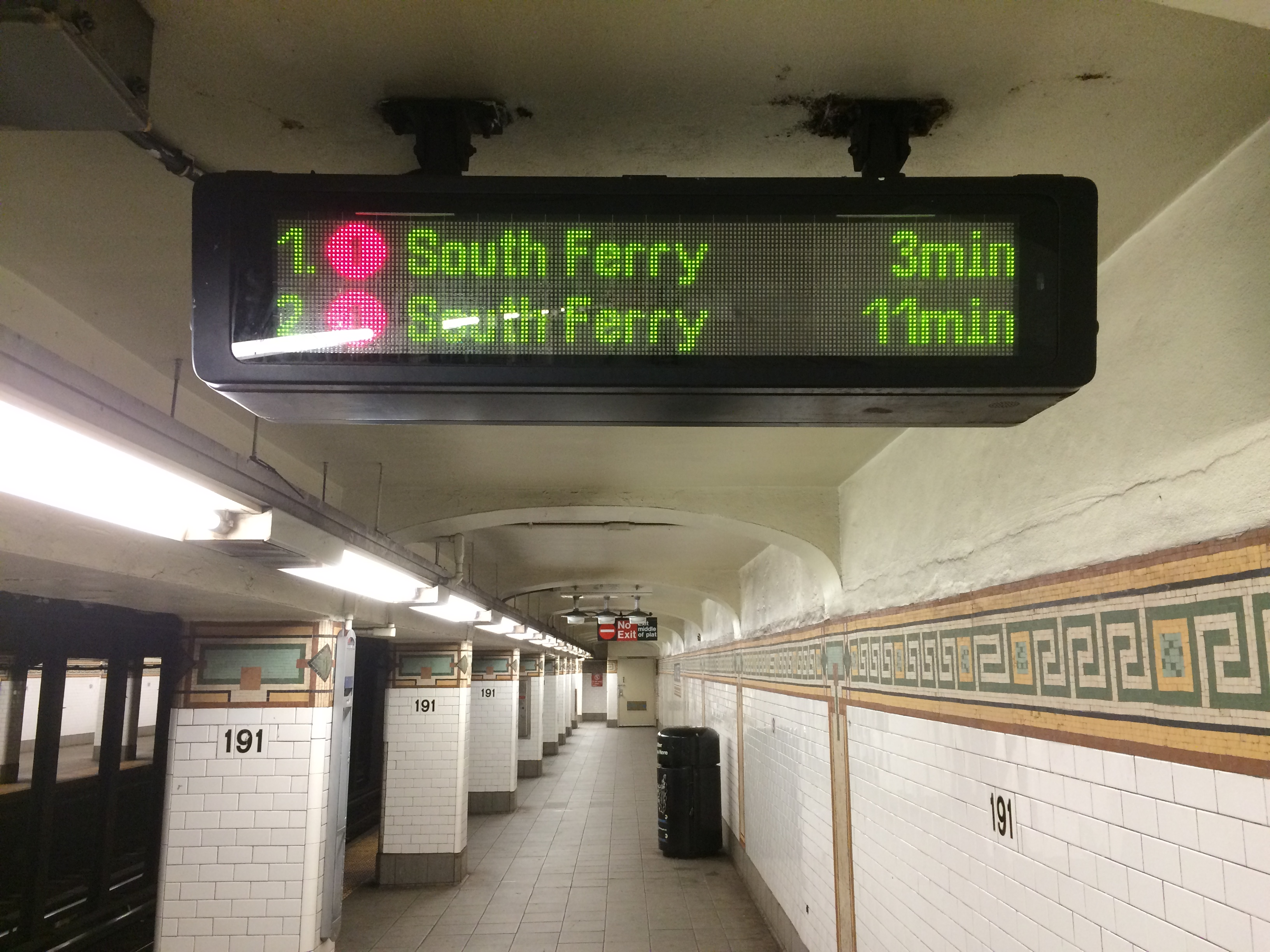
Countdown clocks on the southbound platform

The city government took over the IRT's operations on June 12, 1940. Platforms at IRT Broadway–Seventh Avenue Line stations between 103rd Street and 238th Street, including those at 191st Street, were lengthened to 514 feet (157 m) between 1946 and 1948, allowing full ten-car express trains to stop at these stations. Unlike the other stations being extended on the line, the 191st Street station could already accommodate ten-car trains, but because the platforms were 480 feet (150 m) long, not all doors of the first and last cars could open at the station. On April 6, 1948, the platform extension project at 191st Street was completed. Simultaneously, the IRT routes were given numbered designations with the introduction of "R-type" rolling stock, which contained rollsigns with numbered designations for each service. The route to 242nd Street became known as the 1. In 1959, all 1 trains became local.

On December 28, 1950, the NYCBOT issued a report concerning the feasibility of constructing bomb shelters in the subway system. Five deep stations in Washington Heights, including the 191st Street station, were considered ideal for use as bomb-proof shelters. The program was estimated to cost $104 million (equivalent to $1.392 billion in 2025). The shelters were expected to provide limited protection against conventional bombs, while protecting against shock waves and air blasts, as well the heat and radiation from an atomic bomb. To become suitable as shelters, the stations would require water-supply facilities, first-aid rooms, and additional bathrooms. However, the program, which required federal funding, was never completed.

In Fiscal Year 1961, the installation of fluorescent lighting at the station was completed. In addition, work began on the replacement of two of the station's elevators with automatic elevators, which did not require elevator operators. During fiscal year 1962, two of the station's elevators were replaced. Funding for the rehabilitation of the other two elevators was initially provided in the 1976 New York State budget, but was reallocated. $940,000 would have been required to improve these elevators and those at 181st Street on the IND Eighth Avenue Line. On May 18, 1983, bids for the rehabilitation of elevators at the two stops were put out to tender.

In 1981, the Metropolitan Transportation Authority (MTA) listed the 191st Street station among the 69 most deteriorated stations in the subway system. A renovation of the 191st Street station was funded as part of the MTA's 1980–1984 capital plan. The MTA received a $106 million grant from the Urban Mass Transit Administration in October 1983; most of the grant would fund the renovation of eleven stations, including 191st Street.

On August 21, 1989, with the start of 1/9 weekday skip-stop service, 1 trains began skipping this station between 6:30 am and 7:00 pm, while 9 trains served the station during these times. On September 4, 1994, midday skip-stop service was discontinued, and 191st Street was no longer a skip-stop station. Skip-stop service ended on May 27, 2005, as a result of a decrease in the number of riders who benefited.

=== 21st century ===
In 2001, the nonprofit group Upper Manhattan Together made it a priority to improve the 191st Street station. At the time, passengers had to wait on long lines to get to the platforms because only one or two of the elevators at the station usually worked. The group had persuaded the New York City Department of Transportation (NYCDOT) to paint and improve the lighting in the pedestrian tunnel, and turned their attention to the station's elevators. According to an MTA spokesperson, three elevators were supposed to be running during rush hours - one of the elevators was being renovated, with a second to be done later - and the station would be completely overhauled in 2003. The station and pedestrian tunnel were closed between July 1 and December 31, 2003, for the renovation project. The $15 million renovation was done by New York City Transit crews in-house. As part of the project, the station's elevators were upgraded. New lighting, ceramic wall tiles, granite floor tiles, and public information systems were installed, and steel and concrete supports were repaired. All of the deteriorating tiles and mosaics were replaced with faithful reproductions made by Serpentile. The token booth was moved to the opposite wall as part of the project.

Several of the elevators in the station are staffed by elevator attendants, who are also employed at four other deep-level stations in Washington Heights. The attendants serve as a way to reassure passengers as the elevators are the only entrance to the platforms, and passengers often wait for the elevators with an attendant. The attendants at the five stations are primarily maintenance and cleaning workers who have had injuries that made it hard for them to continue doing their original jobs. In July 2003, to reduce costs, the Metropolitan Transportation Authority (MTA) announced that as part of its 2004 budget it would eliminate 22 elevator operator positions at the 191st Street station and four others in Washington Heights, leaving one full-time operator per station. The agency had intended to remove all the attendants at these stops, but kept one in each station after many riders protested. In addition, the MTA began operating all elevators at all times; prior to the change, each elevator only operated if it was staffed by an elevator operator. The change took effect on January 20, 2004, and was expected to save $1.15 million a year.

In November 2007, the MTA proposed savings cuts to help reduce the agency's deficit. As part of the plan, all elevator operators at 191st Street, along with those in four other stations in Washington Heights, would have been cut. MTA employees had joined riders in worrying about an increase in crime as a result of the cuts after an elevator operator at 181st Street on the Broadway–Seventh Avenue Line helped save a stabbed passenger. The move was intended to save $1.7 million a year. However, on December 7, 2007, the MTA announced that it would not remove the remaining elevator operators at these stations, due to pushback from elected officials and residents from the area. In October 2018, the MTA once again proposed removing the elevator operators at the five stations, but this was reversed after dissent from the Transport Workers' Union. The MTA again suggested reassigning elevator operators to station-cleaner positions in June 2023, prompting local politicians to sue to prevent the operators' reassignments. On August 4, 2023, Manhattan Supreme Court Justice Machelle Sweeting ordered the MTA to keep the operators from being reassigned. Additional hearings will be held to determine whether their proposed removal violates the city's Human Rights Law by eliminating a services provided to subway riders with mobility impairments.

The elevators at this station closed on February 1, 2020, so they could be replaced. Work was expected to be complete in February 2021, but was accelerated; the elevators reopened on November 24, 2020. The station remained open during the work via the exit to Broadway. The new elevators are equipped with CCTV cameras, a back-up power supply, and technology that allows for quicker response times to elevator malfunctions. The rear boarding areas of two of the elevators, originally closed to the public, were reopened to provide additional points of entry to reduce crowding. While the elevators were closed, a temporary M191 shuttle bus service was operated between the Broadway and St. Nicholas Avenue entrance; it was suspended from May 9 to July 1, 2020, due to the COVID-19 pandemic in New York City, and ultimately did not run after July 26, 2020.

Over the weekend of January 19–21, 2024, low barriers were installed at the edges of the station's platforms. The yellow barriers, spaced along the length of the platform, do not have sliding platform screen doors between them.

As part of its 2025–2029 Capital Program, the MTA has proposed making the station wheelchair-accessible in compliance with the Americans with Disabilities Act of 1990.

== Station layout ==
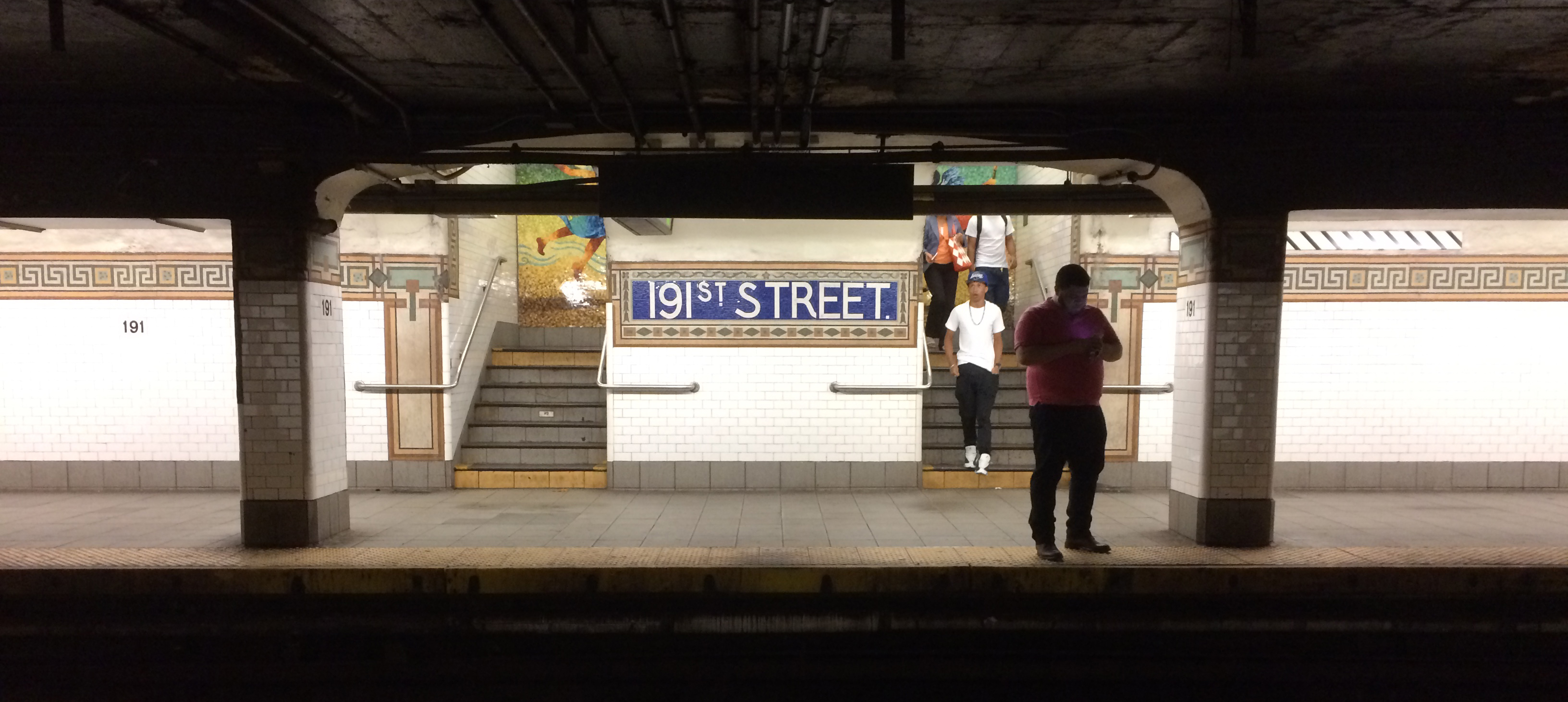
View of station platform

The 191st Street station has two tracks and two side platforms, and is served by the 1 train at all times. The station is between Dyckman Street to the north and 181st Street to the south. Fixed platform barriers, which are intended to prevent commuters falling to the tracks, are positioned near the platform edges. Above the platforms is a mezzanine and covered pedestrian footbridges connecting the two platforms; people on the footbridges cannot see the tracks and platforms (and vice versa). The mezzanine and footbridges are finished in glazed white tile and ceramic sheet marble. The station ceiling is supported by 34 steel columns encased in concrete.

At approximately 173 feet (53 m) below street level, (Note: Some sources cite the station's depth at 180 ft (55 m).) it is the deepest station in the New York City Subway system. It is one of three in the deep-level Fort George Mine Tunnel, along with the 168th Street and 181st Street stations to the south; the tunnel allows the Broadway–Seventh Avenue Line to travel under the high terrain of Washington Heights. In 1947, Victor Hess, who won the 1936 Nobel Prize in Physics for his discovery of cosmic rays, wrote to the NYCBOT asking if he could use the station "to carry out experiments on the radiation emitted from rocks at a location well protected from cosmic rays." Ultimately, Hess was allowed to conduct his experiments in the nearby 190th Street station on the IND Eighth Avenue Line, which is also far below ground. Despite the 191st Street station's depth, the next station north, Dyckman Street, is just above ground level, at a lower elevation above sea level. This is because 191st Street is under nearly the highest point on the island of Manhattan, deep in the Washington Heights Mine Tunnel, while Dyckman Street runs along a deep valley almost at sea level and its station is at the tunnel portal.

As part of the MTA's Arts for Transit Program, during the station's 2003 renovation, $88,360 was allocated for the creation and installation of a mosaic tile piece of art titled Primavera by Raul Colon.

=== Exits ===
There are two entrances/exits from this station via the same fare control. The main entrance/exit at the southwest corner of 191st Street and St. Nicholas Avenue is at the summit of a hill and accessible only by a set of four elevators. The elevators to the mezzanine still utilize elevator operators—one of the few stations in the system to do so. The other entrance/exit, at 190th Street and Broadway west of the station, is located at a hillside and is accessed via a three-block long passageway, which passes under Wadsworth Terrace and Avenue. The station is not compliant with the Americans with Disabilities Act of 1990 (ADA), and thus cannot be used by patrons with wheelchairs, because access from the fare control area to the platforms, as well as access from both the elevators and passageway to street level, are only possible via stairways.

== Pedestrian tunnel ==
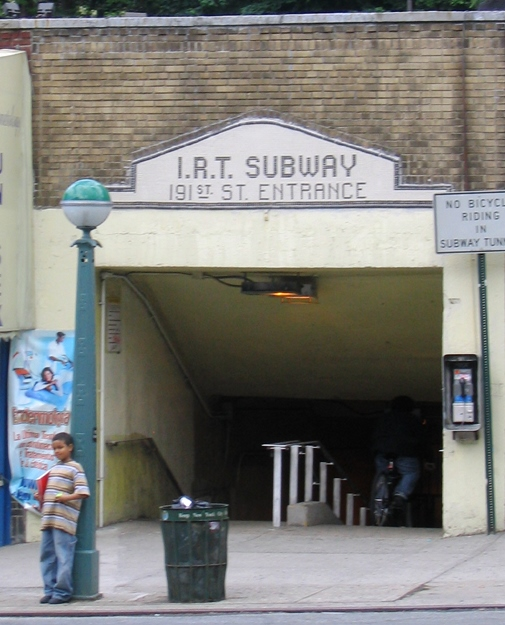
Tunnel entrance as seen in 2005

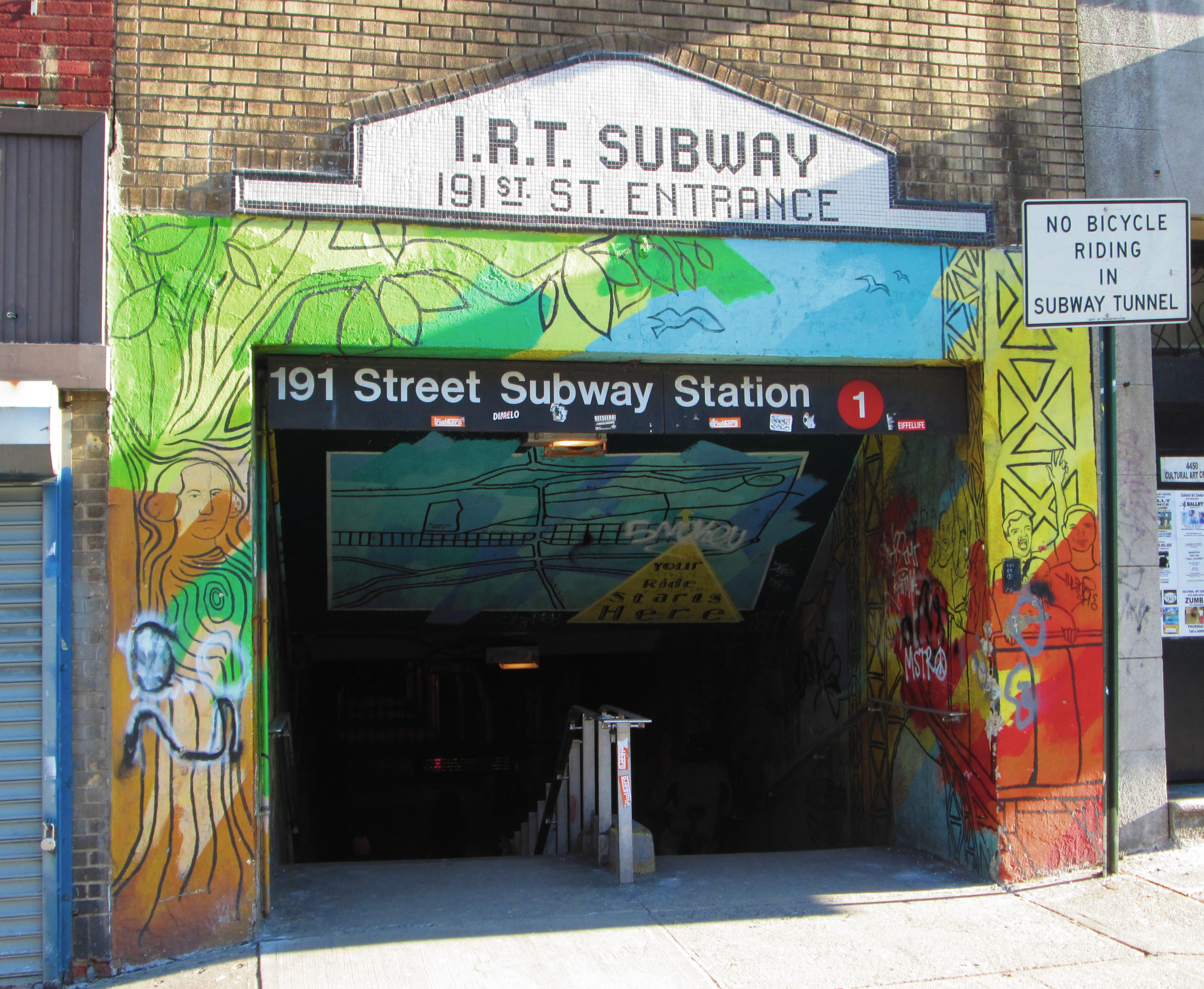
Tunnel entrance as seen in 2013, with artwork titled New York is a Rollercoaster

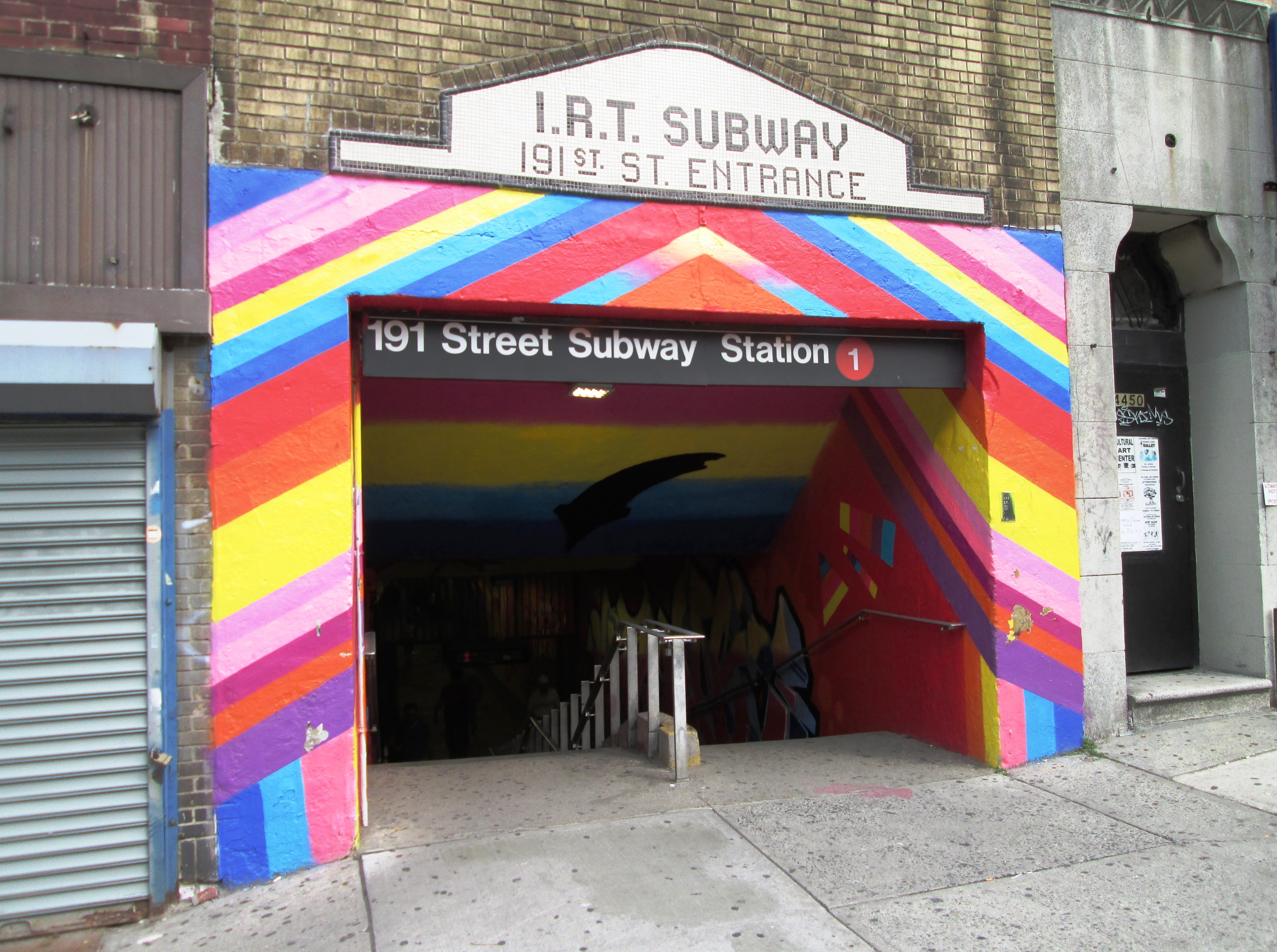
Tunnel entrance as seen in 2015 with newly painted murals

The 900-foot-long (270 m) passageway between the station's Broadway entrance and the station itself is not maintained by the MTA, despite being marked as a subway entrance. It is a property of the New York City Department of Transportation, and is officially called "Tunnel Street". The tunnel is also used as a connector between western and eastern Washington Heights; passengers using the other entrance, at 191st Street and St. Nicholas Avenue, need to take an elevator to access the station due to that intersection's height. The elevators at that entrance, which are outside fare control, are considered a convenient way to traverse the neighborhood without walking up a hill.

In the early 1990s the city's crime rates reached an all-time high. The station was considered very dangerous, with 11 crimes having taken place there in 1990; many of them were suspected to have happened in the tunnel. At the time, the tunnel was dimly lit, covered with graffiti, and strewn with garbage. Brighter lights were installed in 2000. In February 2006, State Senator Eric Schneiderman and others proposed the city turn the tunnel over to the MTA. They felt the MTA had more experience in maintaining tunnels, noting it owned the tunnels at the 181st Street and 190th Street stations on the IND Eighth Avenue Line, which were in better condition. In September 2014, improvements began on the tunnel, which area residents had complained about. The tunnel, which had graffiti and was frequented by cyclists riding bikes illegally, was slated to get several murals and new LED lighting.

The passageway has been painted with murals since the late 2000s to beautify the tunnel. In 2008, a mural was painted on the passageway leading up from Broadway to the station, as part of the Groundswell Community Mural Project. It was called New York is a Rollercoaster. It was later vandalized, and in May 2015, it was painted over. Since then, the passageway's artwork has consisted of five murals. As part of a tunnel beautification program, the NYCDOT chose four artists and one team of artists, mostly local, from an applicant pool of 158. They were chosen to paint a 200 feet (61 m) section of the tunnel. From the Broadway entrance to the station fare control, the artworks are: Queen Andrea's Prismatic Power Phrases; Jessie Unterhalter and Katey Truhn's Caterpillar Time Travel; Cekis's It's Like A Jungle/Aveces Es Como Una Jungle; Nick Kuszy's Warp Zone; and Cope2's Art is Life. Awarded $15,000 each, the artists worked for over a week on their art. After the murals in the tunnel were heavily graffitied, the NYCDOT covered the entire tunnel with white paint in January 2023, which elicited criticism from the surrounding community. At the time, the NYCDOT said that it planned to commission new artwork for the tunnel.

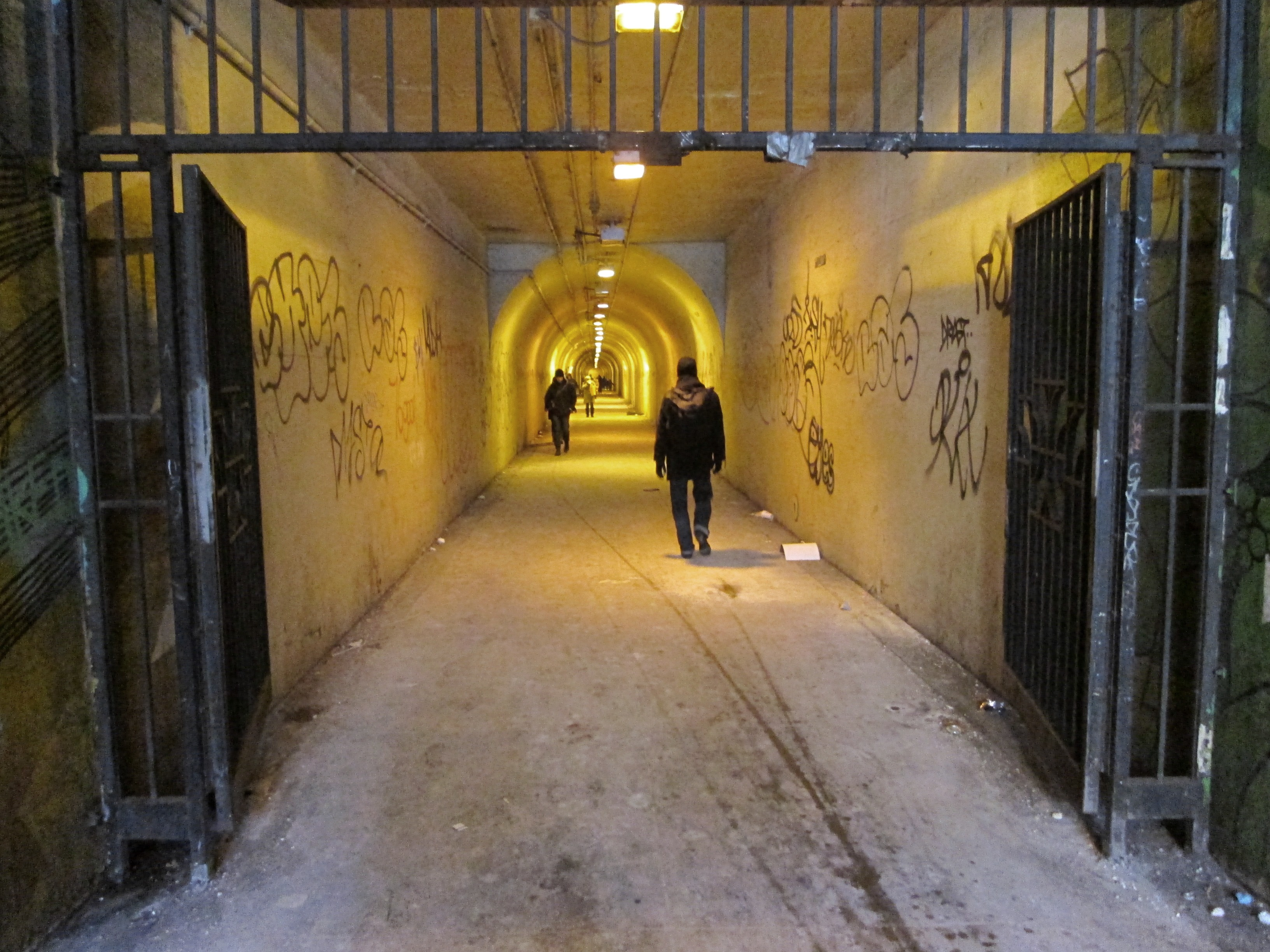
The pedestrian tunnel before artwork was installed (2014)

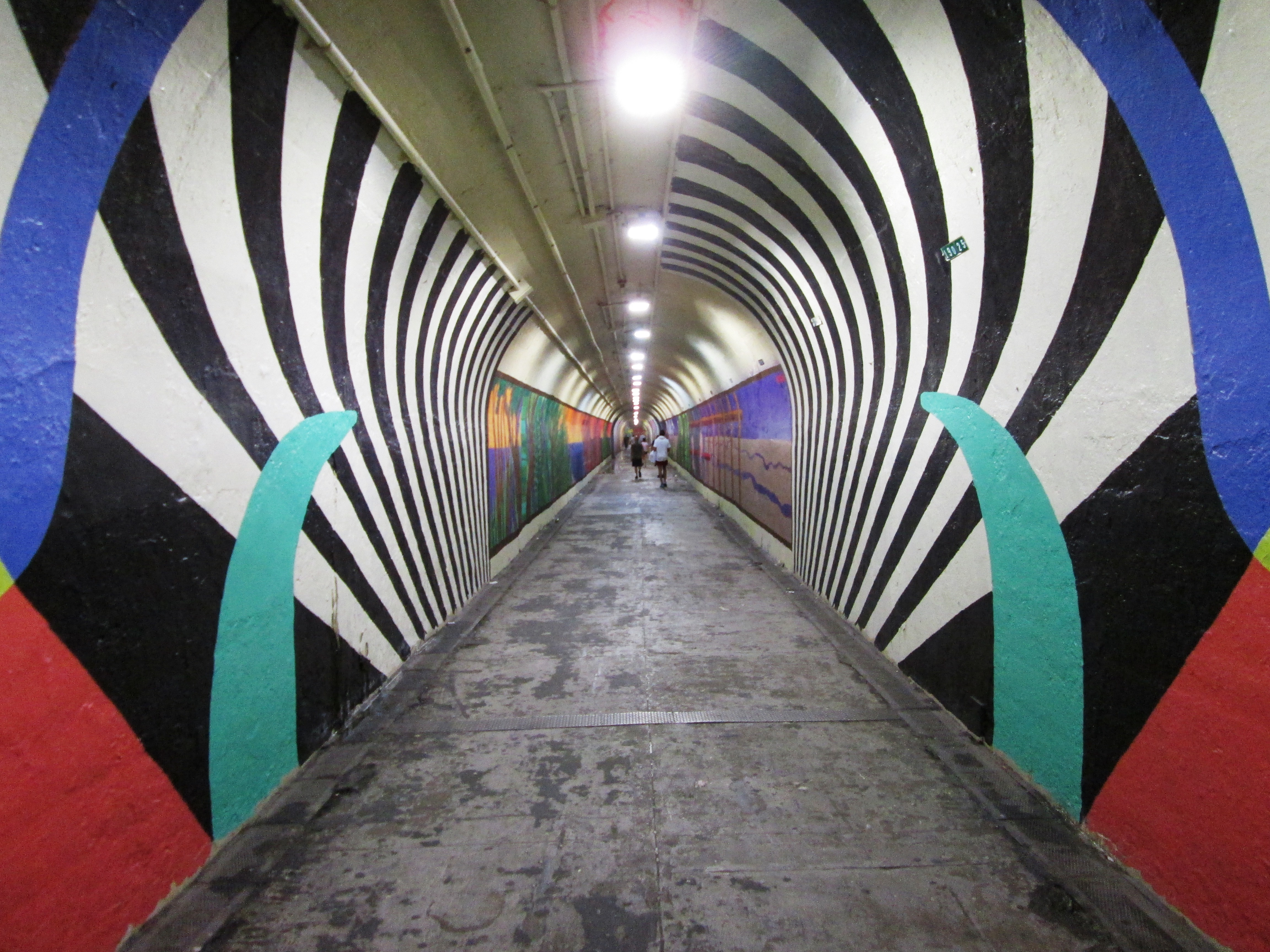
Caterpillar Time Travel by Jessie Unterhalter and Katey Truhn

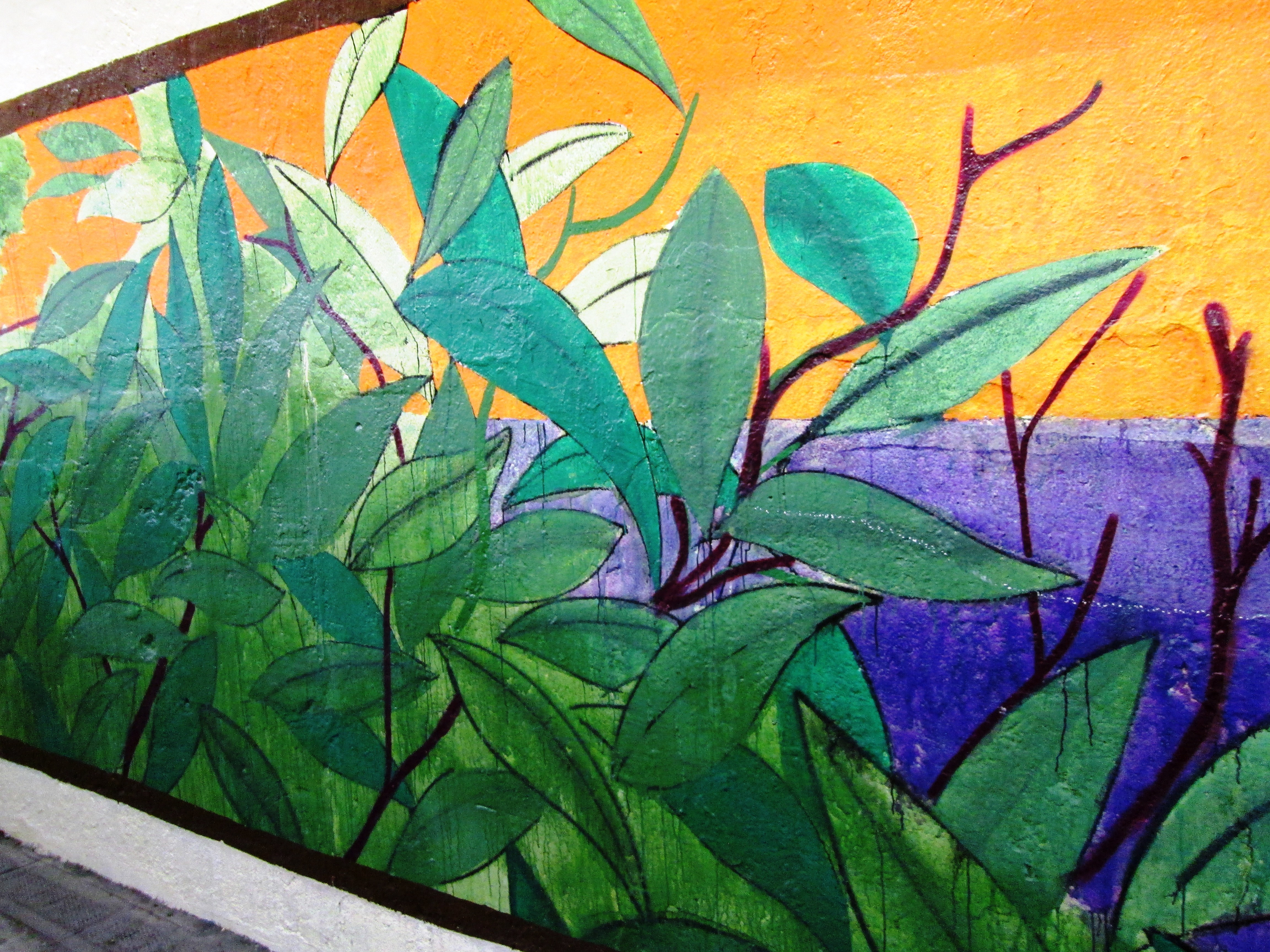
It's Like A Jungle by Nelson Cekis

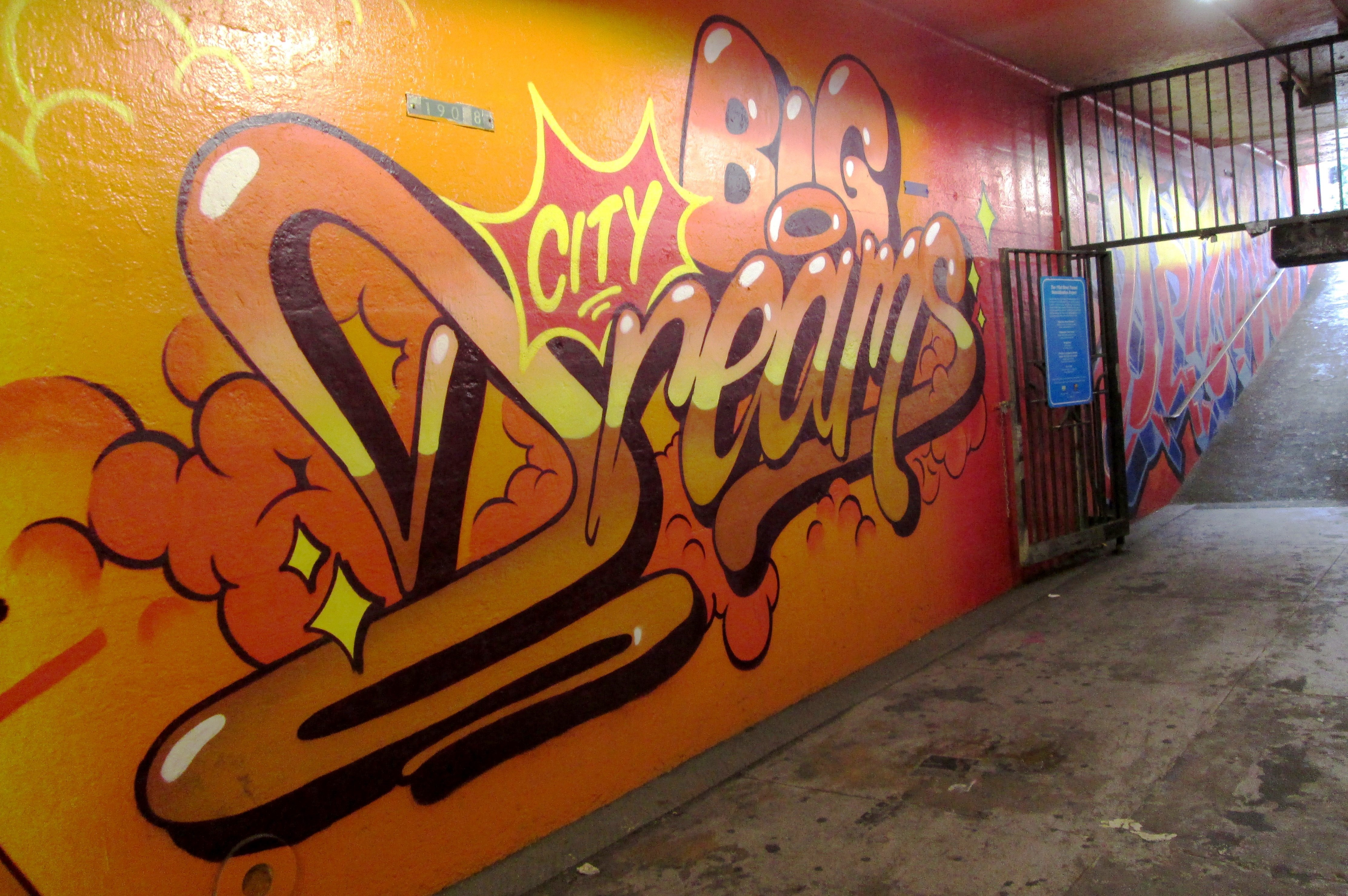
Prismatic Power Phrases by Queen Andrea

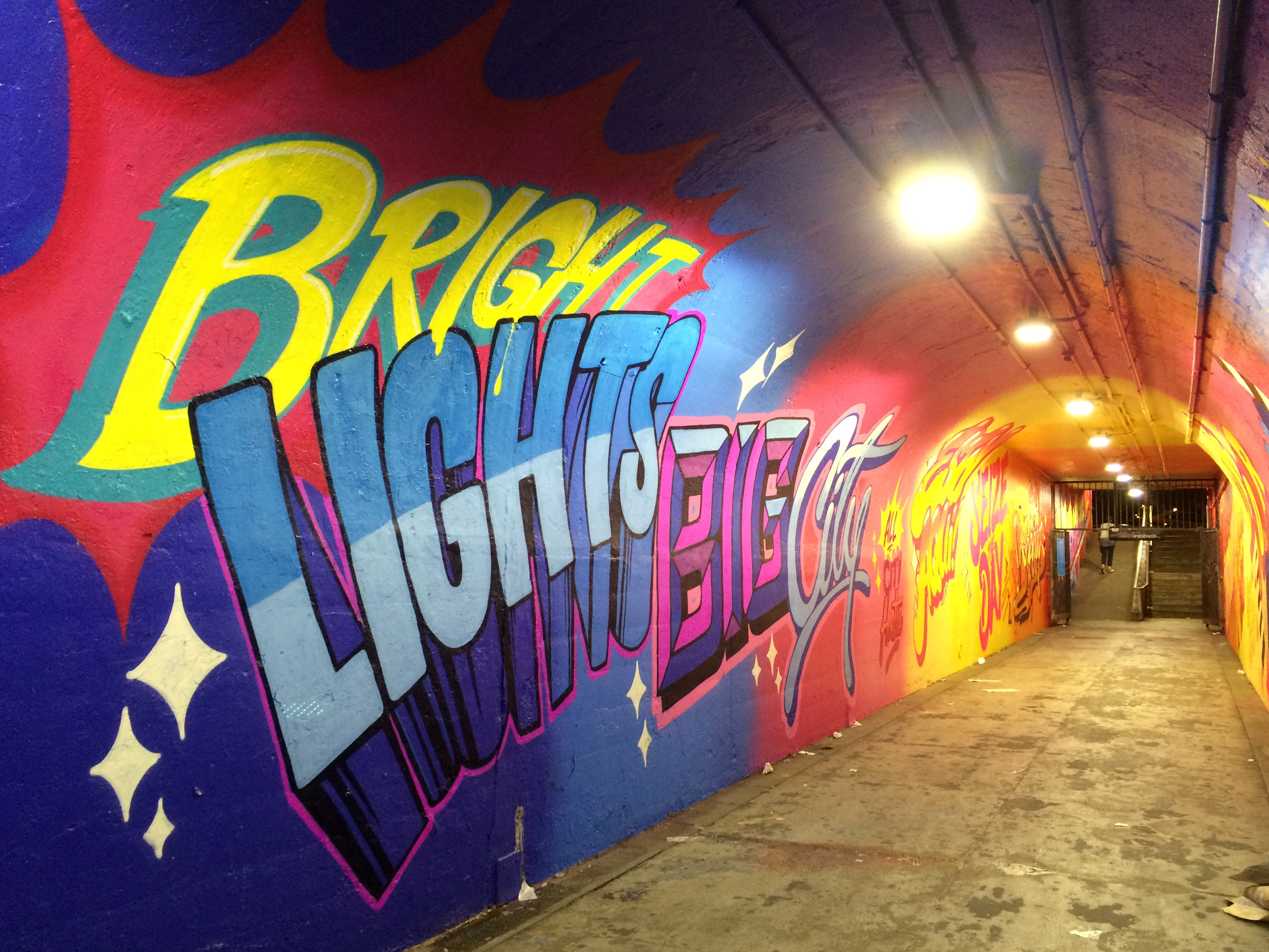
Another view of Prismatic Power Phrases by Queen Andrea

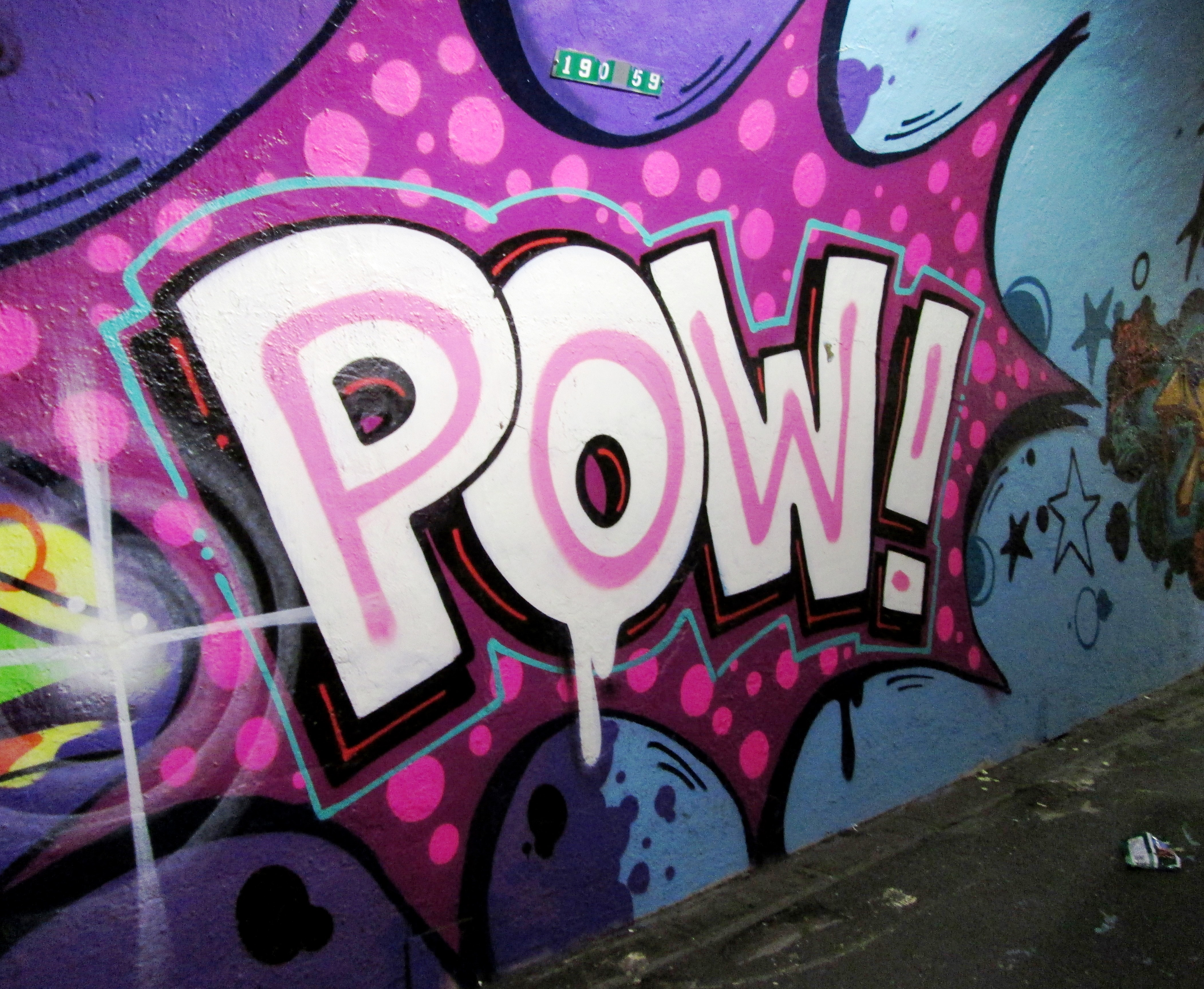
Art is Life by Cope2

== Ridership ==
In Fiscal Year 1914, shortly after the station's opening, it had 546,447 boardings, significantly lower than the figures for the adjacent 181st Street and Dyckman Street stations, which were 6,133,256 and 923,785, respectively. In 2018, the station had 2,526,932 boardings, making it the 186th most used station in the 424-station system. This amounted to an average of 8,032 passengers per weekday.

== In popular culture ==
- The station was a filming location in the 2021 film In the Heights.
