= IRT Broadway–Seventh Avenue Line =

New York City Subway line

- The 1, 2, and 3 trains, which use the Broadway–Seventh Avenue Line through Midtown Manhattan, are colored red.

Overview
- Owner: City of New York
- Locale: Manhattan and the Bronx, New York City
- Termini: Van Cortlandt Park–242nd Street; South Ferry (Manhattan branch); Borough Hall (Brooklyn branch)
- Stations: 44

Service
- Type: Rapid transit
- System: New York City Subway
- Operator: New York City Transit Authority
- Daily ridership: 772,083 (south of 96th Street); 230,318 (north of 96th Street) (2023, weekday) (Note: This total is achieved by adding the total ridership of the stations on the Broadway–Seventh Avenue Line.)

History
- Opened: October 27, 1904; 122 years ago
- Last extension: 1919

Technical
- Num of tracks: 1–4
- Character: Underground (Brooklyn and most of Manhattan); Elevated (125th Street and North of Inwood)
- Track gauge: 4 ft 8 1/2 in (1,435 mm) standard gauge
- Electrification: Third rail, 625 V DC
Route map
Express station	Local station	Closed station

The IRT Broadway–Seventh Avenue Line (also known as the IRT Seventh Avenue Line or the IRT West Side Line) is a New York City Subway line. It is one of several lines that serves the A Division, stretching from South Ferry in Lower Manhattan north to Van Cortlandt Park–242nd Street in Riverdale, Bronx. The Brooklyn Branch, known as the Wall and William Streets Branch during construction, from the main line at Chambers Street southeast through the Clark Street Tunnel to Borough Hall in Downtown Brooklyn, is also part of the Broadway–Seventh Avenue Line. The IRT Broadway–Seventh Avenue Line is the only line to have elevated stations in Manhattan, with two short stretches of elevated track at 125th Street and between Dyckman and 225th Streets.

The line was constructed in two main portions by the Interborough Rapid Transit Company (IRT), a private operator. The first portion, north of 42nd Street, was opened between 1904 and 1908, and is part of the first subway line in the city. The line ran from City Hall, up the Lexington Avenue Line, across 42nd Street, and up Seventh Avenue and Broadway, before splitting into the Broadway Branch and the Lenox Avenue Line. The second portion of the line, that south of 42nd Street, was constructed as part of the Dual Contracts, which were signed between the IRT, the New York Municipal Railway (a subsidiary of the Brooklyn Rapid Transit Company), and the City of New York. Among the various subway lines that were to be constructed as part of the contracts, the West Side Line was to be extended south along Seventh Avenue to serve Manhattan's West Side.

This extension extended service to the end of Lower Manhattan and into Brooklyn, relieving crowding on the East Side Line, while opening up service to new areas. The Pennsylvania Railroad's new hub in Manhattan, Penn Station, could now be accessed by the subway. Additionally, Manhattan's West Side was rebuilt with the arrival of the line. To allow the wide four-track line to go through the area, new streets had to be mapped and built, and new buildings were constructed as a result. Capacity on the IRT's subway system doubled, increasing its usage.

Since the line opened, service patterns have been streamlined. Originally, express and local trains ran to both the Broadway Branch and to the Lenox Avenue Line, resulting in delays. As part of a rebuilding of the line in the late 1950s, all local trains were sent up the Broadway Branch, and all express trains were sent up the Lenox Avenue Line. Accompanying these changes were the lengthening of platforms, new subway cars, and the closing of the 91st Street station. One other major change in service was the implementation of skip-stop service on the 1 and 9 trains in 1989, but this was discontinued in 2005 as few people benefited. The Cortlandt Street station, destroyed following the September 11 attacks, was completely rebuilt and reopened in September 2018 as WTC Cortlandt. The original South Ferry station, a five-car balloon loop, was also replaced with a two-track terminal in 2009; the new South Ferry terminal was rebuilt in 2017 after being flooded during Hurricane Sandy in 2012.

== Description ==
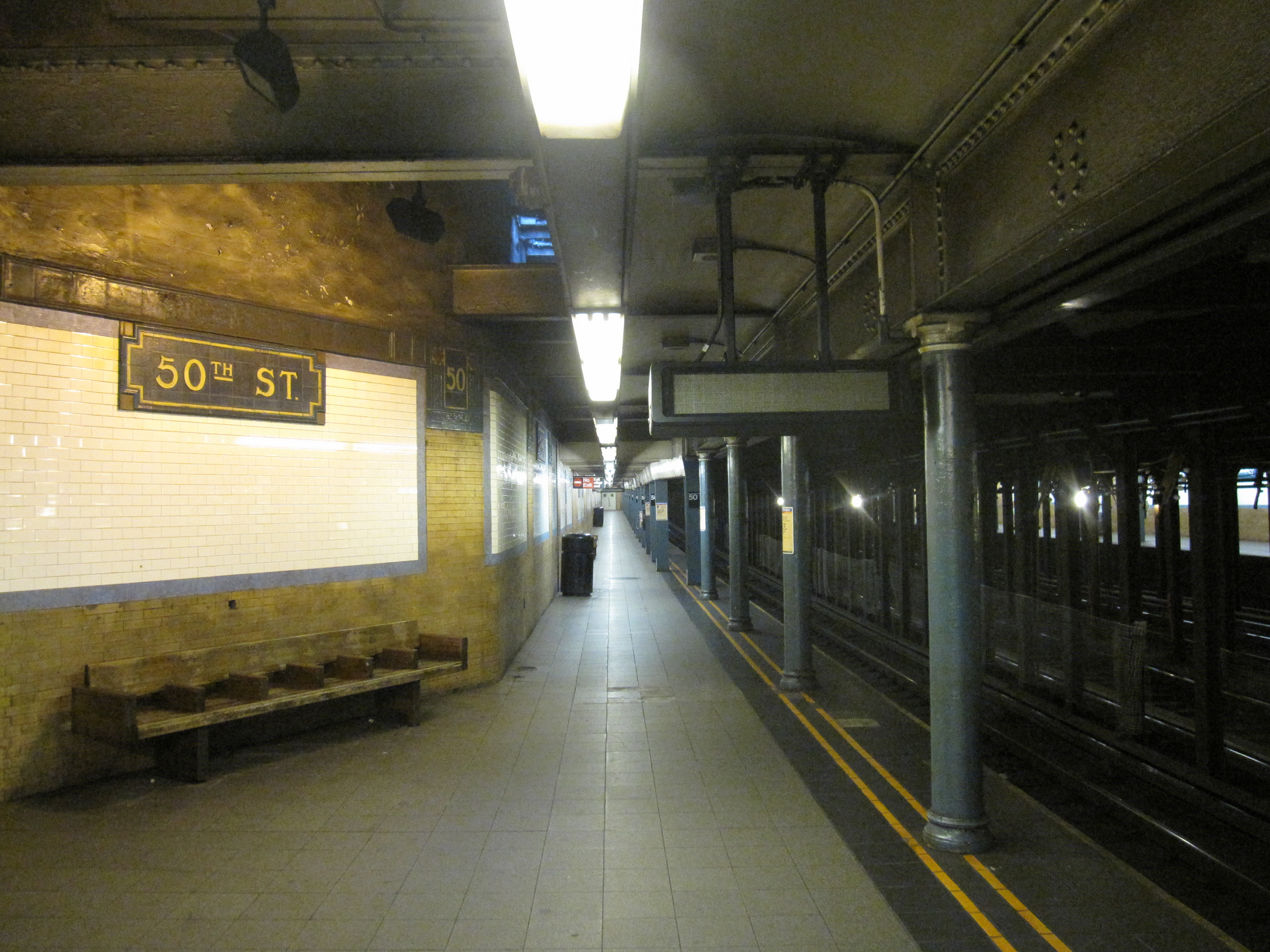
50th Street, one of the line's original stations

Also known as the IRT West Side Line, since it runs along the west side of Manhattan, the IRT Broadway–Seventh Avenue Line runs from Van Cortlandt Park–242nd Street in the Bronx, close to New York City's border with Westchester, to South Ferry in Lower Manhattan, at the southernmost point in the borough. Along the way, the line serves places such as Times Square, Lincoln Center, Columbia University, and the City College of New York. The portion of the line north of 42nd Street was built as part of the first subway in New York in 1904.

Train services that use the IRT Broadway–Seventh Avenue Line are colored red on subway signage and literature. The line is served by the 1, 2, and 3 trains, which operate together over much of the line. Between 1989 and 2005, the 1 train operated as a skip-stop service in Upper Manhattan in tandem with the 9. The 1 and 9 alternated skipping stops along the line, with some stops having both trains stop. This was intended to speed commutes without having to have express service run down the line. This service was discontinued after May 27, 2005; from 1994 onward, this skip-stop separation existed only during rush hours.

A third track along much of the line north of 96th Street has been used in the past for peak direction express service, at least between 96th Street and 137th Street. This center track is currently used only during construction reroutes. There is another unused third track between Dyckman Street and Van Cortlandt Park–242nd Street. Three yards have connections to the line. The 240th Street Yard is located between Van Cortlandt Park-242nd Street and 238th Street. This yard holds 21 layup tracks and can hold the entire rolling stock for the 1. The next yard, 207th Street Yard holds a few trains that are used during rush hours and cleans and overhauls some of the line's fleet. Finally, the 137th Street Yard has six tracks, which hold rush hour turn-around trains.

Where the Brooklyn Branch ends at its southern end is unclear. In a 1981 list of "most deteriorated subway stations", the MTA listed Borough Hall and Clark Street stations as part of the IRT New Lots Line. However, as of 2007, emergency exit signs label Borough Hall as an IRT Broadway–Seventh Avenue Line station, and the two parts of Borough Hall are signed as being along the Broadway–Seventh Avenue and IRT Eastern Parkway Lines. At Borough Hall, the chaining designations, "K" (Clark Street Tunnel) and "M" (Joralemon Street Tunnel), which are used to precisely specify locations in the system, join and become "E" (Eastern Parkway Line) at Borough Hall.

=== Clark Street Tunnel ===
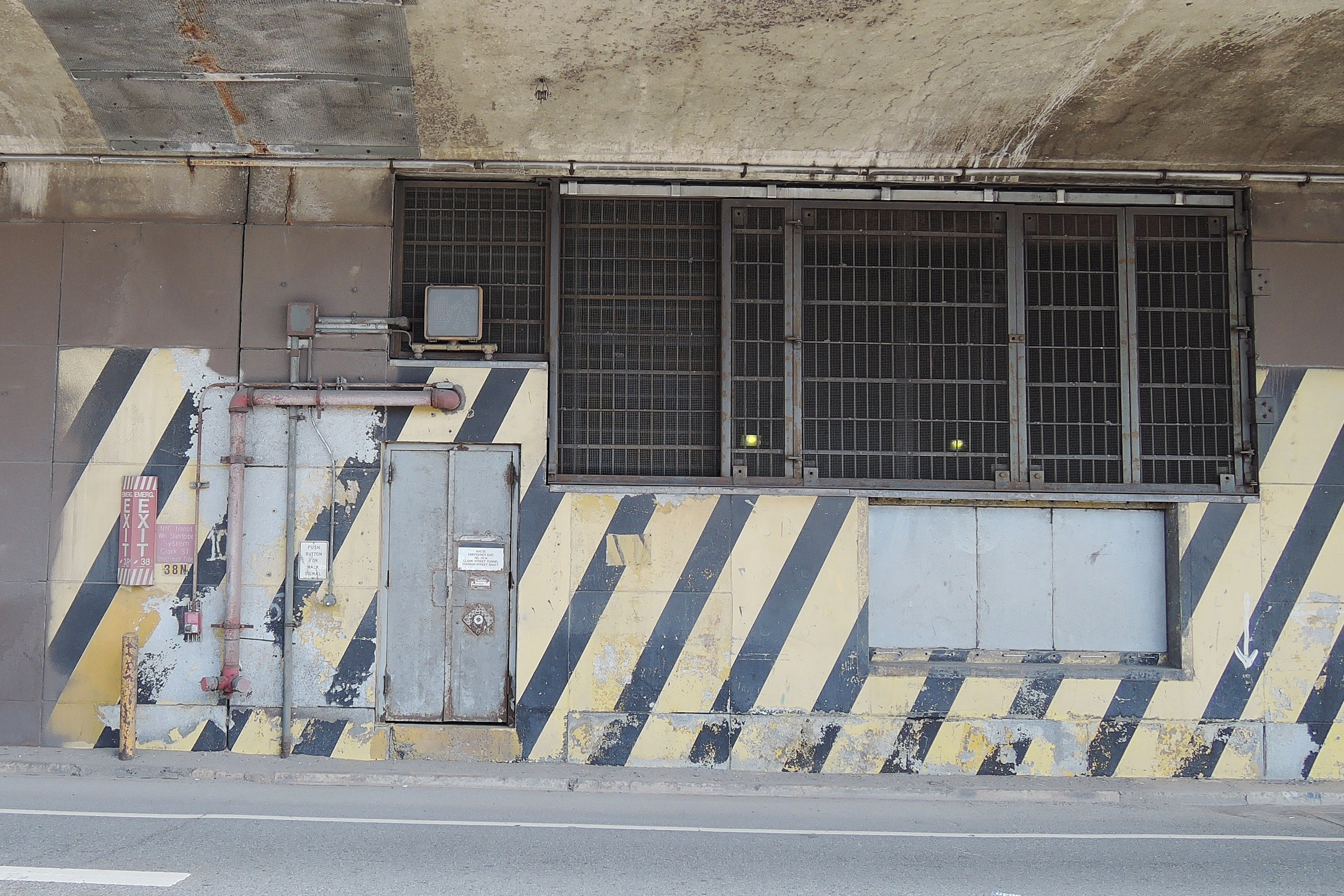
Emergency exit, Furman Street, Brooklyn

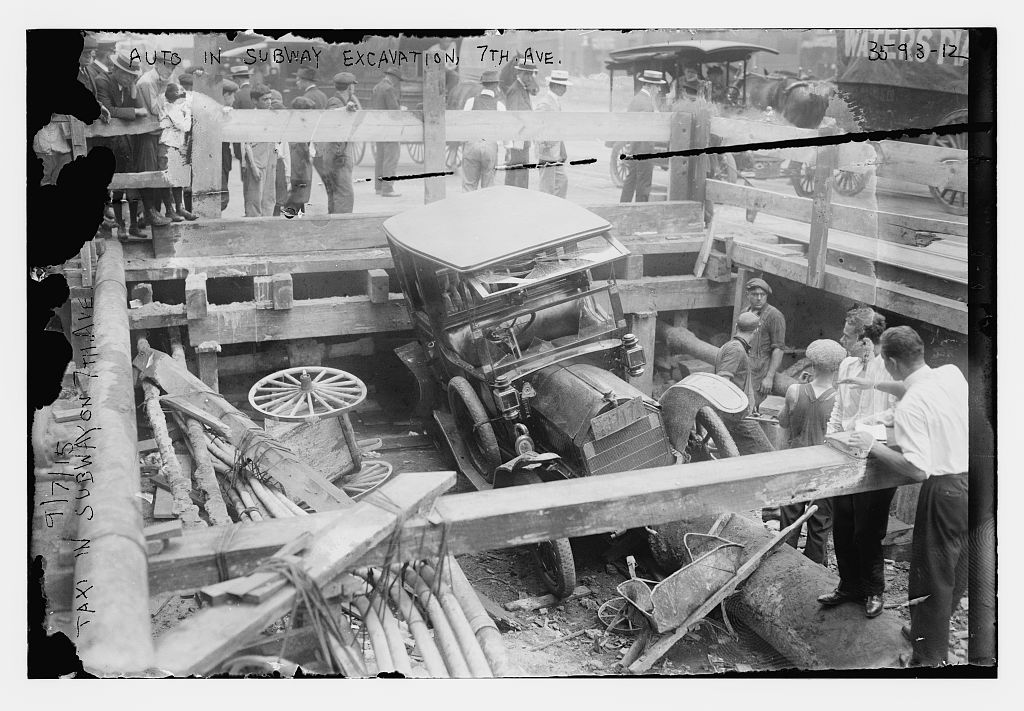
1915 Seventh Avenue subway collapse with car fallen in tunnel

The Clark Street Tunnel carries the 2 and 3 trains under the East River between the boroughs of Manhattan and Brooklyn. It was opened for revenue service on Tuesday, April 15, 1919, relieving crowding on the Joralemon Street Tunnel and providing passengers with a direct route between Brooklyn and the west side of Manhattan. It is about 5,900 feet (1,800 m) long, with about 3,100 feet (940 m) underwater.

Booth & Flinn Ltd. and the O'Rourke Engineering Construction Company received a $6.47 million contract in July 1914 to build a tunnel between Old Slip in Manhattan and Clark Street in Brooklyn. Construction of the tunnel began on October 12, 1914, using a tunneling shield in conjunction with compressed air. The tunnel was designed by civil engineer Clifford Milburn Holland, who later served as the first chief engineer of the Holland Tunnel. Five hundred men, working in several shifts, excavated the tubes for 24 hours a day. The north tube was holed through on November 28, 1916, followed by the south tube on December 19 of the same year.

On December 28, 1990, an electrical fire in the Clark Street Tunnel trapped passengers on a subway train for over half an hour. The fire killed two people and injured 149 others.

== History ==
=== Contracts 1 and 2 ===
Operation of the first subway began on October 27, 1904, with the opening of all stations from City Hall to 145th Street on the West Side Branch. The line was mostly underground, except for the section surrounding 125th Street, which ran across the elevated Manhattan Valley Viaduct to cross a deep valley there. Service was extended to 157th Street on November 12, 1904, as that station's opening had been delayed because of painting and plastering work. The West Side Branch was extended northward to a temporary terminus at 221st Street and Broadway on March 12, 1906, served by shuttle trains operating between 157th Street and 221st Street. However, only the Dyckman Street, 215th Street, and 221st Street stations opened on that date as the other stations were not yet completed. The 168th Street station opened on April 14, 1906. The 181st Street station opened on May 30, 1906, and on that date express trains on the Broadway branch began running through to 221st Street, eliminating the need to transfer at 157th Street to shuttles. The station at 207th Street was completed in 1906, but since it was located in a sparsely occupied area, it did not open until April 1, 1907. The original system as included in Contract 1 was completed on January 14, 1907, when trains started running across the Harlem Ship Canal on the Broadway Bridge to 225th Street, and the nearby 221st Street station was closed.

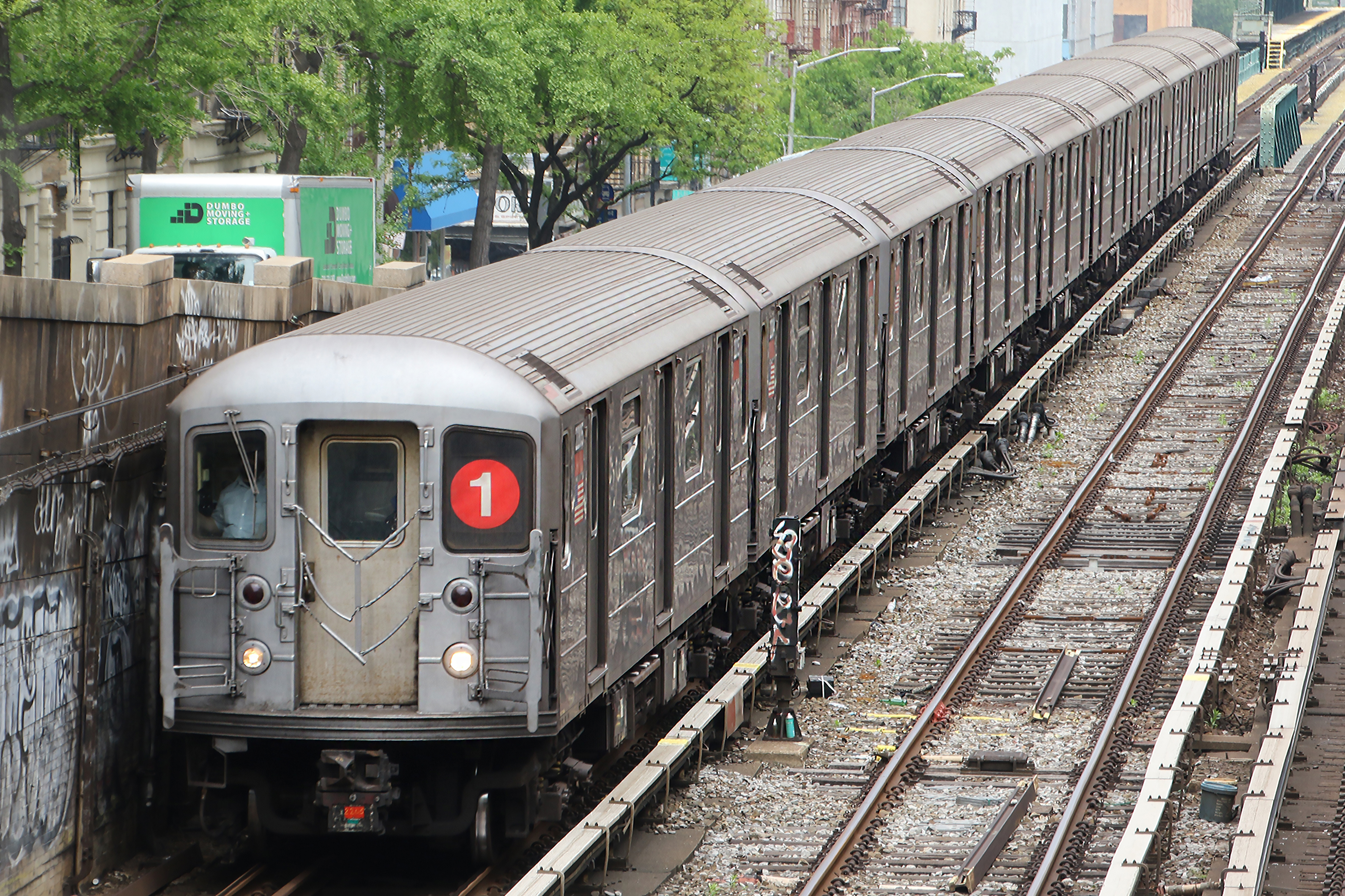
A 1 train in service departing 125th Street along part of the route of the Original Subway.

Once the line was extended to 225th Street on January 14, 1907, the 221st Street platforms were dismantled and moved to 230th Street for a new temporary terminus. Service was extended to the temporary terminus at 230th Street on January 27, 1907. An extension of Contract 1 north to 242nd Street at Van Cortlandt Park was approved in 1906 and opened on August 1, 1908. (The original plan had been to turn east on 230th Street to just west of Bailey Avenue, at the New York Central Railroad's Kings Bridge station.) When the line was extended to 242nd Street, the temporary platforms at 230th Street were dismantled, and were rumored to be brought to 242nd Street to serve as the station's side platforms. The 191st Street station did not open until January 14, 1911, because the elevators and other work at the station had not yet been completed.

Between 1904 and 1908, one of the main service patterns was the West Side Branch, running from Lower Manhattan to Van Cortlandt Park via what is now the Lexington Avenue, 42nd Street, and Broadway–Seventh Avenue Lines. There were both local and express services with express trains south of 96th Street. Some express trains ran to Atlantic Avenue in Brooklyn via the Joralemon Street Tunnel during rush hours while all other trains turned around at City Hall or South Ferry.

=== Dual Contracts ===
==== Planning and construction ====
The Dual Contracts, which were signed on March 19, 1913, were contracts for the construction and/or rehabilitation and operation of rapid transit lines in the City of New York. The contracts were "dual" in that they were signed between the City and two separate private companies (the Interborough Rapid Transit Company and the Brooklyn Rapid Transit Company), all working together to make the construction of the Dual Contracts possible. The Dual Contracts promised the construction of several lines in Brooklyn. As part of Contract 3, the IRT agreed to build a branch of the original subway line south down Seventh Avenue, Varick Street, and West Broadway to serve the West Side of Manhattan.

The construction of this line, in conjunction with the construction of the Lexington Avenue Line, would change the operations of the IRT system. Instead of having trains go via Broadway, turning onto 42nd Street, before finally turning onto Park Avenue, there would be two trunk lines connected by the 42nd Street Shuttle. The system would be changed from looking like a "Z" system on a map to an "H" system. One trunk would run via the new Lexington Avenue Line down Park Avenue, and the other trunk would run via the new Seventh Avenue Line up Broadway. In order for the line to continue down Varick Street and West Broadway, these streets needed to be widened, and two new streets were built, the Seventh Avenue Extension and the Varick Street Extension. It was predicted that the subway extension would lead to the growth of the Lower West Side, and to neighborhoods such as Chelsea and Greenwich Village.

Originally, there were to be no express stops between 34th Street–Penn Station to the north and Chambers Street to the south. By late 1912, local merchants were advocating for the construction of an express station at 14th Street and Seventh Avenue.

Construction started on the extension in 1914. To allow for the extension of the line south from Times Square, the entire western wall of the subway between 43rd Street and 44th Street was removed, all while service continued uninterrupted. The line was mostly built in an open-cut, excluding the segments within the limits of Battery Park, the widened portions of Varick Street, and the new Varick and Seventh Avenue Extensions. Filled in ground was found south of Varick Street along Greenwich Street, which approximately marked the old shore line of the Hudson River during the time of the American Revolution. Many buildings had to be underpinned during the construction of the line, especially those on the lower sections through Greenwich Street.

South of Chambers Street, there were to be two branches constructed. The first of the two would run to the Battery via Greenwich Street, while the second branch would turn eastward under Park Place and Beekman Street and down William Street and Old Slip. After going through Lower Manhattan, the second branch would go through a tunnel under the East River before running under Clark and Fulton Streets until a junction at Borough Hall with the existing Contract 2 IRT Brooklyn Line. In order to pass under the Broadway and Park Row subway lines, this branch has grades as steep as 3%, being located 60 feet (18 m) below surface level. As a result, the Park Place station was built with escalators. Because William Street is so narrow (40 feet (12 m) wide), every building along the line had to be underpinned. The entire line, consisting of eight sections, was expected to cost $14,793,419 (equivalent to $437,695,195 in 2025).

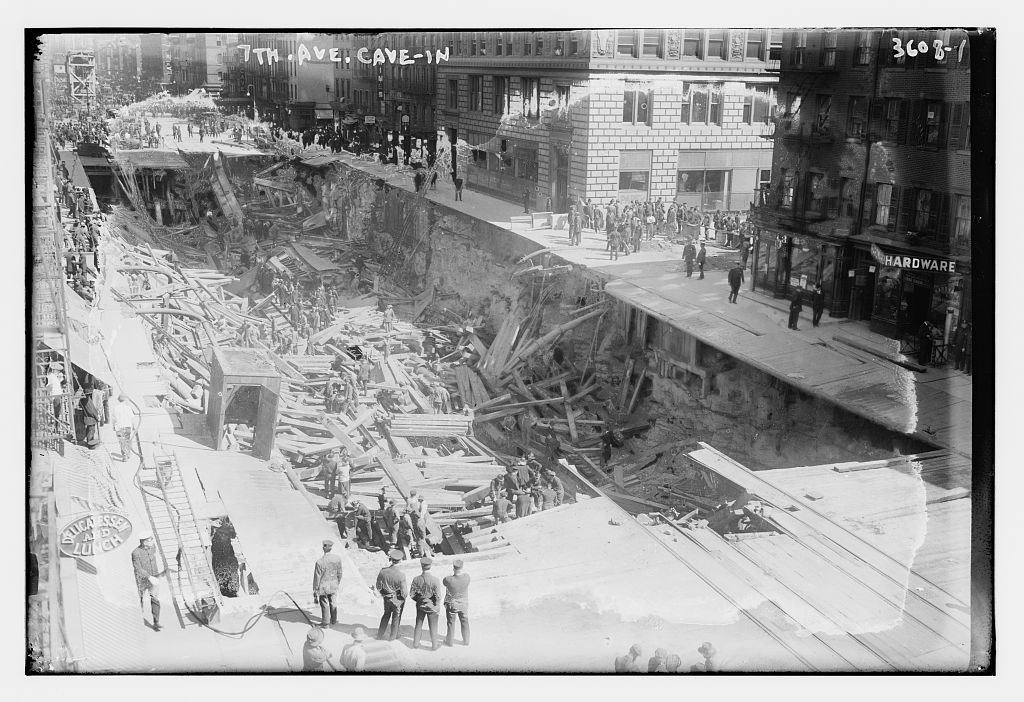
Subway collapse in 1915

On September 22, 1915, there was an explosion during construction of the 23rd Street subway station that caused the tunnel to collapse. Seven people were killed after a blast of dynamite in the subway tunnel destroyed the plank roadway over Seventh Avenue. As a result, a crowded trolley car, and a brewery truck fell into the excavation, accounting for most of the injuries.

==== Opening ====
On June 3, 1917, the first portion of the Broadway–Seventh Avenue Line south of Times Square–42nd Street, a shuttle to 34th Street–Penn Station, opened; a separate shuttle service, running between 42nd and 34th Streets, was created. This short extension was opened even though the rest of the route was not yet completed in order to handle the mass of traffic to and from Pennsylvania Station. Only the northern part of the station was opened at this time, and piles of plaster, rails, and debris could be seen on the rest of the platforms.

On June 27, 1918, the Public Service Commission (PSC) announced that on July 1, the shuttle would be extended south to South Ferry, with a shorter shuttle on the Brooklyn branch between Chambers Street and Wall Street, on July 1, 1918. The PSC's decision to open the line before the Lexington Avenue Line was completed was unexpected. The new "H" system was implemented on August 1, 1918, joining the two halves of the Broadway–Seventh Avenue Line and sending all West Side trains south from Times Square. An immediate result of the switch was the need to transfer using the 42nd Street Shuttle. The completion of the "H" system doubled the capacity of the IRT system.

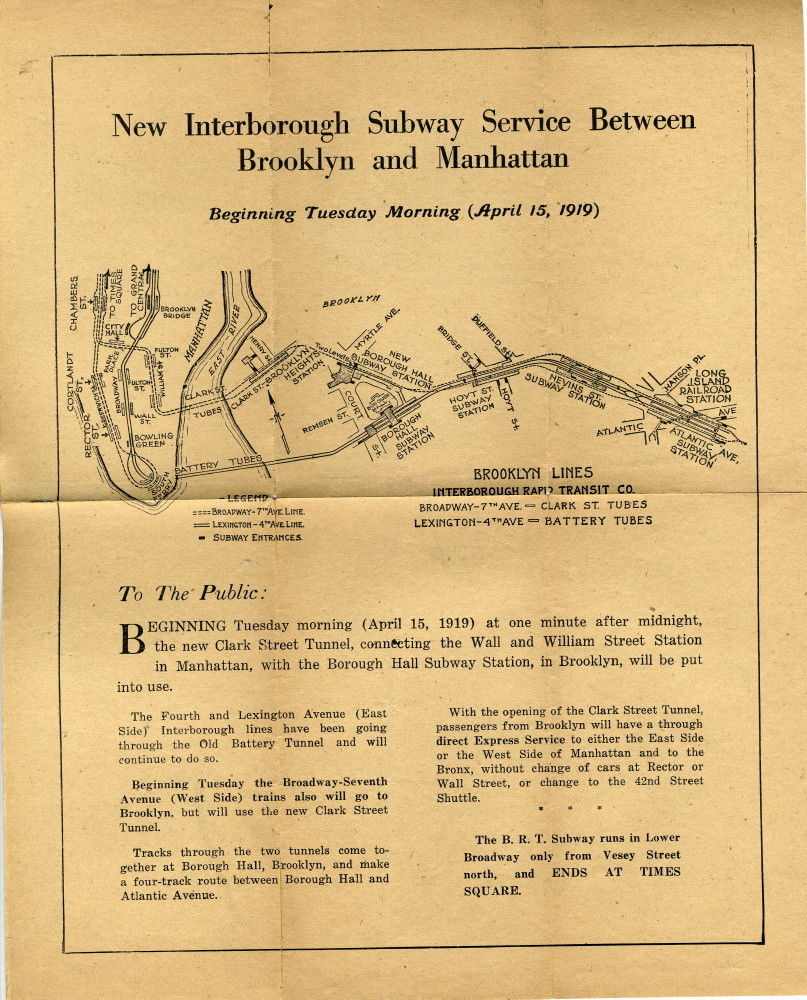
Poster announcing the opening of the Clark Street Tunnel.

The local tracks ran to South Ferry, while the express tracks used the Brooklyn branch to Wall Street, extended to Atlantic Avenue in Brooklyn via the Clark Street Tunnel on April 15, 1919. Extensions of the Eastern Parkway Line and the connecting Nostrand Avenue Line and New Lots Line opened in the next few years, with the end result being that West Side trains ran to Flatbush Avenue or New Lots Avenue.

=== 1940s to 1990s ===
In 1948, platforms on the line from 103rd Street to 238th Street were lengthened to 514 feet (157 m) to allow full ten-car express trains to platform. Previously the stations could accommodate only six car local trains. The platform extensions were opened in stages. On April 6, 1948, the stations from 103rd Street to Dyckman Street had their platform extensions opened, with the exception of the 125th Street station, which had its extension opened on June 11, 1948. On July 9, 1948, the platform extensions at stations between 207th Street and 238th Street were opened for use at the cost of $423,000 (equivalent to $5,668,317 in 2025).

During the early 1950s, it was considered to convert the Columbus Circle station from a local stop to an express stop in order to serve the anticipated rise of ridership at the stop resulting from the proposed New York Coliseum and the expected redevelopment of the area. In 1955, the firm Edwards, Kelcey and Beck was hired as Consulting Engineers for the construction of the express station.

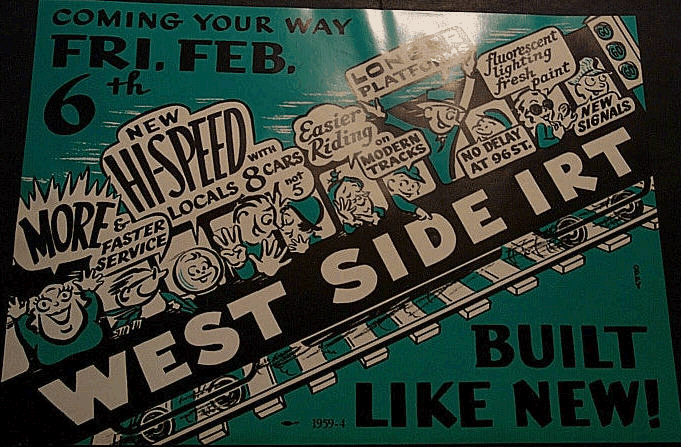
A poster detailing the improvements made to the line as part of the West Side Improvement.

Under a $100 million (equivalent to $1.104452055×10^{9} in 2025) rebuilding program, increased and lengthened service was implemented during peak hours on the 1 train. To the north of 96th Street, delays occurred as some trains from the Lenox Avenue Line switched from the express to the local tracks, while some trains from the Broadway Branch switched from the local to the express tracks. This bottleneck was removed on February 6, 1959. All Broadway trains became locals, and all Lenox Avenue trains became expresses, eliminating the need to switch tracks. All 3 trains began to run express south of 96th Street on that date running to Brooklyn. 1 trains began to run between 242nd Street and South Ferry at all times. Trains began to be branded as Hi-Speed Locals, being as fast as the old express service was, with 8-car trains consisting of new R21 and R22 subway cars from the St. Louis Car Company. During rush hour in the peak direction, alternate trains, those running from 242nd Street, made no stops except 168th Street between Dyckman and 137th Streets in the direction of heavy traffic. The bypassed stations were served by locals originating from Dyckman Street.

The improved service could not be implemented until the platform extensions at all stations on the line were completed. The original IRT stations north of Times Square could barely fit five or six car locals based on whether the trains had one or two ends with cars that had manually operated doors. In 1958, the platform extensions at the local stations were nearly completed, but there were more problems with the platform extensions at the two express stations, 72nd Street and 96th Street. To make room for the platform extension at 72nd Street, the track layout was changed. However, in order to fit the platform extension at 96th Street, the local tracks and the outside walls had to be moved. A new mezzanine with stairways to the street was built between West 93rd Street and West 94th Street. Since the 86th Street and 96th Street stations had their platforms extended in order to accommodate 10-car trains, the 91st Street station was closed on February 2, 1959, because it was too close to the other two stations.

In 1961, the New York City Transit Authority (NYCTA) awarded a $11 million (equivalent to $118,513,363 in 2025) contract to General Railway Signal to upgrade the line's signals between the 96th Street and 242nd Street stations. On August 9, 1964, the NYCTA announced the letting of a $7.6 million (equivalent to $78,894,850 in 2025) contract to lengthen platforms at stations from Rector Street to 34th Street–Penn Station on the line, and stations from Central Park North–110th Street to 145th Street on the Lenox Avenue Line to allow express trains to be lengthened from nine-car trains to ten-car trains, and to lengthen locals from eight-car trains to ten-car trains. With the completion of this project, the NYCTA project to lengthen IRT stations to accommodate ten-car trains would be complete. During the 1964–1965 fiscal year, the platforms at Park Place, Fulton Street, Wall Street, Clark Street and Borough Hall were lengthened to 525 feet (160 m) to accommodate a ten-car train of 51 feet (16 m) long IRT cars.

In 1986, the NYCTA launched a study to determine whether to close 79 stations on 11 routes, including the Broadway–Seventh Avenue Line north of 215th Street, due to low ridership and high repair costs. Numerous figures, including New York City Council member Carol Greitzer, criticized the plans.

On August 21, 1989, the 1/9 weekday skip-stop service started. The plan was to have skip-stop service begin north of 116th Street–Columbia University, but due to objections, most notably that riders did not want 125th Street to be a skip-stop station, skip-stop service was only implemented north of 137th Street–City College between the hours of 6:30 am and 7:00 pm. All 1 trains skipped Marble Hill–225th, 207th, 191st and 145th Streets, while all 9 trains skipped 238th, 215th, Dyckman and 157th Streets. On September 4, 1994, midday skip-stop service was discontinued, and 191st Street was no longer a skip-stop station.

=== 21st century ===
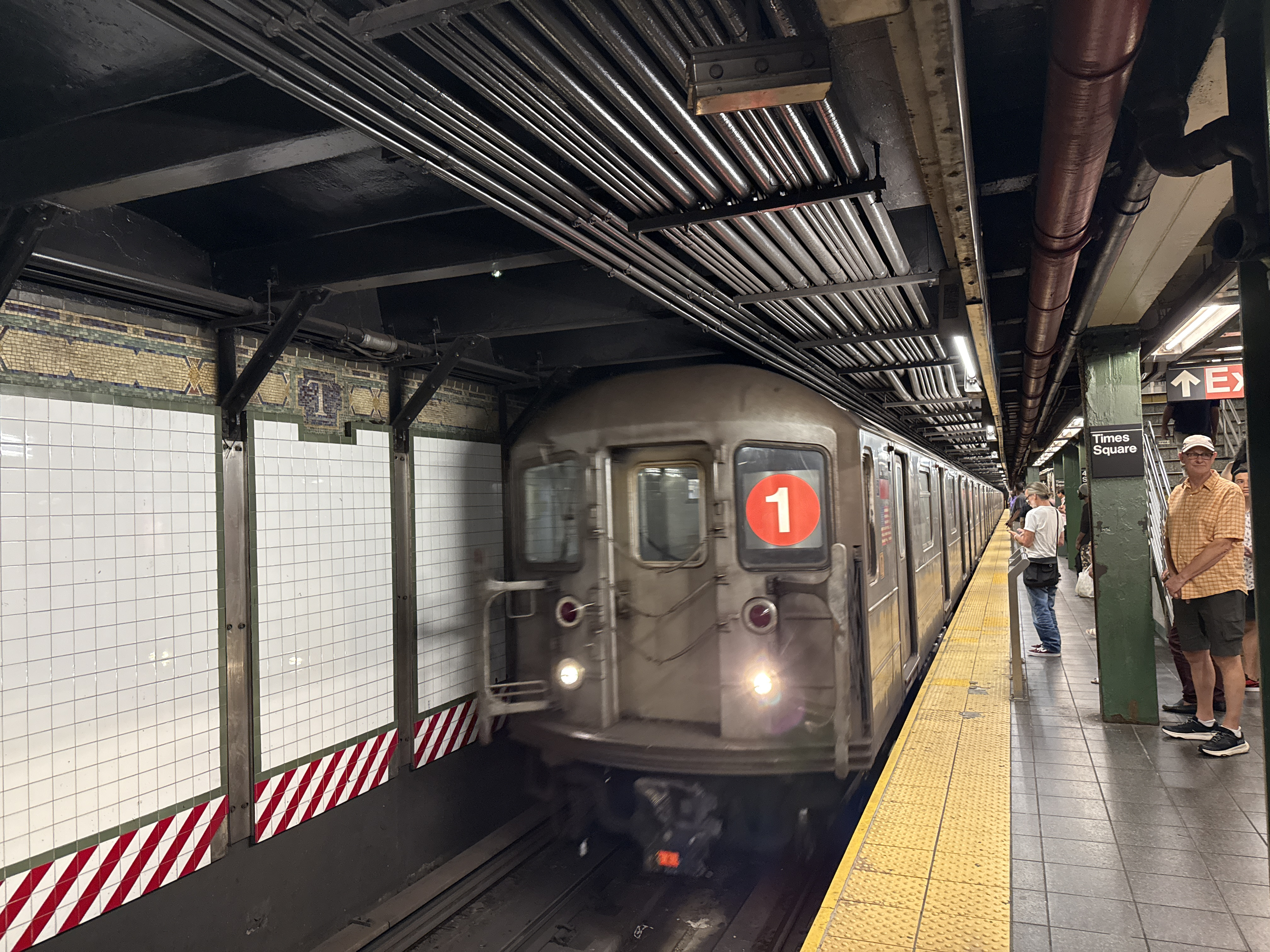
An uptown 1 train stops at Times Square-42nd Street station on the IRT Broadway–Seventh Avenue Line

After the September 11 attacks, all 1 trains had to be rerouted since the IRT Broadway–Seventh Avenue Line ran directly under the World Trade Center site and was heavily damaged in the collapse of the Twin Towers. 1 trains ran only between 242nd Street and 14th Street, making local stops north of and express stops south of 96th Street. The skip-stop service with the 9 train was suspended. On September 19, after a few switching delays at 96th Street, service was changed. All 1 trains made all stops from 242nd Street to New Lots Avenue via the Clark Street Tunnel and IRT Eastern Parkway Line, to replace all 3 trains (which terminated at 14th Street) at all times except late nights, when it terminated at Chambers Street in Manhattan instead. On September 15, 2002, all 1 trains returned to the South Ferry Loop and 9 skip-stop service was reinstated. Cortlandt Street, which was directly underneath the World Trade Center, was demolished as part of the clean-up, to be rebuilt as part of the World Trade Center Transportation Hub.

In June 2002, the Metropolitan Transportation Authority (MTA) announced that ten subway stations citywide, including 103rd Street, 110th Street, 116th Street, 125th Street, and 231st Street on the IRT Broadway–Seventh Avenue Line, would receive renovations. As part of the project, fare control areas would be redesigned, flooring, and electrical and communication systems would be upgraded, and new lighting, public address systems and stairways would be installed. In addition, since 110th Street, 116th Street, and 125th Street had landmark status, historical elements would be replaced or restored, including their white wall tiles. At the ends of the station platforms at 103rd Street, 110th Street, and 116th Street, a small section of station wall, which would look identical to the existing station walls, would be added to provide space for scrubber rooms. Work on the ten citywide renovation projects was estimated to cost almost $146 million, and was scheduled to start later that year, and be completed in April 2004, in time for the 100th anniversary of the station's opening, and the 250th anniversary of Columbia University.

Columbia University agreed to contribute $1 million to the renovation of the 103rd Street station following its announcement in April that it would purchase a building adjacent to that station. In September 2002, the university was in negotiations to provide funding for the renovation of the 110th Street station. As a condition of the funding allocation for the station renovation at 103rd Street, the university wanted work on the project to be expedited. Residents of Morningside Heights approved of the renovations plans, but were concerned that the expedited repairs would come at the cost of damaging the stations' historic elements. Block associations near the 103rd Street station contracted a firm to develop a plan to renovate the station quickly while maintaining its historic elements. A similar plan was already completed for the 110th Street station. The MTA was expected to decide whether preservation or speed would be prioritized in the station renovation projects by the end of the year.

The design of the station renovations at the 110th Street and 116th Street was met with controversy as local community activists believed that the plan to include artwork from the MTA's Arts for Transit program would damage the stations' original decorative tiling, which had remained untouched since the stations opened. The community activists believed that the new artwork would also be illegal for going against restrictions put into place when they were landmarked. The MTA had planned to install a small bronze subway track and train to be inlaid within the station walls surrounded by sepia-toned photographs of the neighborhood at 116th Street. In December 2002, Manhattan Community Board 7 voted in favor of the plan to include artwork from the MTA's Arts for Transit program at the 103rd Street station, which was not landmarked, but voted against the plan to include new artwork at the landmarked 110th Street and 116th Street. On February 4, 2003, Community Board 7 voted in favor of renovating the 103rd Street and 110th Street stations, but against the inclusion of any new artwork in the stations, going against the board's initial vote to support the installation of artwork at 103rd Street. The opposition to the addition of artwork at that stop stemmed from the belief among opponents of the plan for artwork that the station's historic features would be more vulnerable as the station was not landmarked.

Columbia University contributed $1 million (equivalent to $1,704,545 in 2025) to the station renovation project at 116th Street after the MTA said it would have to put off the renovation projects in Manhattan due to funding issues. Columbia also provided funding to cover a portion of the cost of renovating the 125th Street station, and funded the substitution of the station's aluminum vents with glass windows to reflect the station's original design. Due to concerns expressed by community groups, the addition of art to the 110th Street and 116th Street stations was dropped. From May 31 to July 12, 2003, the uptown platforms at 116th Street station and 103rd Street were closed at all times for their renovations. The station renovation project at 116th Street began in January 2003. Between October 5 and November 17, 2003, the downtown platforms at 110th Street and 125th Street were closed to expedite work on their renovations.

On May 27, 2005, the 9 train was discontinued and all 1 trains began to make all stops. The skip-stop service made less sense by 2005 because of the increased number of trains being run and the higher ridership at the bypassed stations; the MTA estimated that eliminating skip-stop service only added 2 1/2 to 3 minutes of travel time (for passengers at the northernmost stations at 242nd Street and 238th Street) but many passengers would see trains frequencies double, resulting in decreased overall travel time (because of less time waiting for trains).

Gap fillers deploy as a train arrives at the South Ferry station

On March 16, 2009, the new South Ferry station opened, replacing the original loop station. The loop station could only accommodate the first five cars of a train and required the use of gap fillers because of the sharpness of the loop curve. The new station was built as a two-track, full (10-car)-length island platform on a less severe curve, permitting the operation of a typical terminal station. The newer station does not have a connection to the IRT Lexington Avenue Line, and is underneath the loop station. The MTA claimed that the new station saved four to six minutes of a passenger's trip time and increased the peak capacity of the 1 service to 24 trains per hour, as opposed to 16 to 17 trains per hour with the loop station. This was the first new station to open since 1989 when the IND 63rd Street Line stations opened.

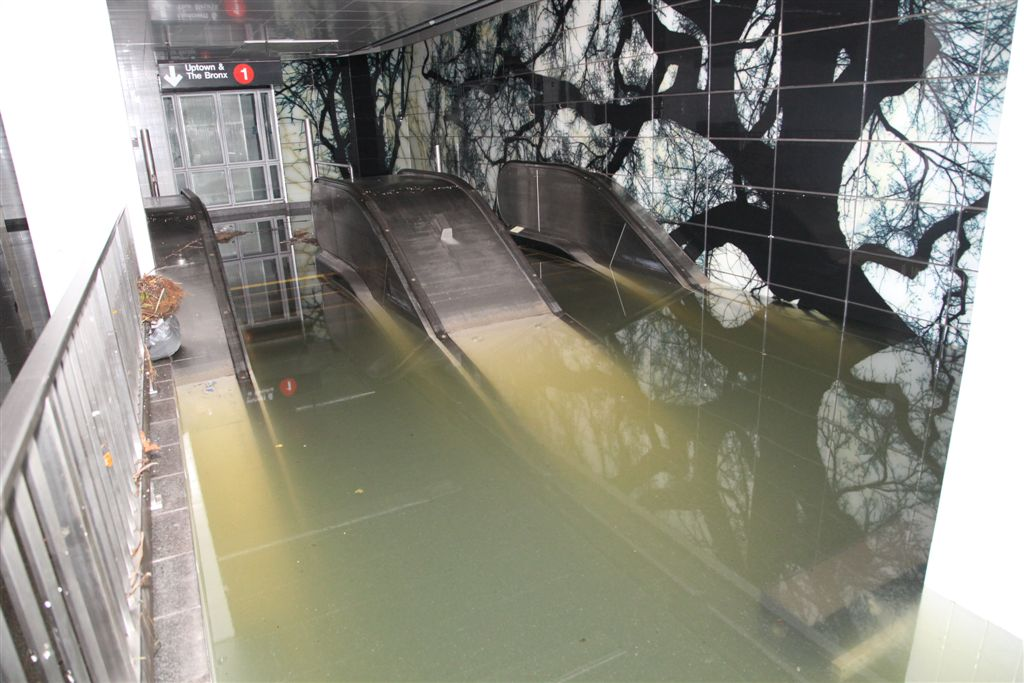
After Hurricane Sandy, the new South Ferry station was flooded and damaged, requiring the old station to reopen.

1 service was affected by Hurricane Sandy in October 2012, following serious flood damage at South Ferry. Rector Street served as a temporary terminal until April 4, 2013, when the 1 returned to the reopened old loop station. Hurricane Sandy also damaged the Clark Street Tubes, necessitating a full closure on weekends from June 27, 2017, to June 24, 2018, thus affecting 2, 3, 4, and 5 service. In addition, as a result of the closure for repairs of the Clark Street Tubes, the stations on the Brooklyn Branch of the line (Park Place to Borough Hall, as well as Hoyt Street on the Eastern Parkway Line) saw closures on weekends as well (2 trains continued to operate to Brooklyn on weekdays and weekday late nights as did 3 trains on weekdays except late nights). The new South Ferry station reopened on June 27, 2017, in time to accommodate the Clark Street closures. Throughout the duration of the Clark Street tunnel closures, a free out-of-system MetroCard transfer was provided between South Ferry (where 2 trains were rerouted from 11:45pm Fridays to 5:00am Mondays), and Bowling Green (where 4 and 5 trains ran local in Brooklyn in place of the 2 and 3 trains during those same times). Normal service on the Brooklyn Branch resumed on June 25, 2018. The Cortlandt Street station reopened on September 8, 2018 as WTC Cortlandt.

== Extent and service ==
The following services use part or all of the Broadway–Seventh Avenue Line, whose services' bullets are colored red:

Route	Time period	Section of line				
Route	Time period	Between 242 St and 96 St	Between 96 St and 34 St	Between 34 St and Chambers St	Between Chambers St and Borough Hall	Between Chambers St and South Ferry
"1" train	All times	local			no service	local
"2" train	All times except late nights	no service	express			no service
"2" train	Late nights	no service	local			no service
"3" train	All times except late nights	no service	express			no service
"3" train	Late nights	no service	express	no service		

== Station listing ==
Station service legend
Stops all times	Stops 24 hours a day
Stops all times except late nights	Stops every day during daytime hours only
Stops late nights only	Stops every day during overnight hours only
Stops weekdays during the day	Stops during weekday daytime hours only
Stops rush hours only	Stops during weekday rush hours only
Stops rush hours in the peak direction only	Stops during weekday rush hours in the peak direction only
Time period details
Disabled access	Station is compliant with the Americans with Disabilities Act
↑	Station is compliant with the Americans with Disabilities Act in the indicated direction only
↓	Station is compliant with the Americans with Disabilities Act in the indicated direction only
	Elevator access to mezzanine only

Neighborhood (approximate)	Disabled access	Station	Tracks	Services	Opened	Transfers and notes
The Bronx
Riverdale		Van Cortlandt Park–242nd Street		1	August 1, 1908	
Center express track begins (no regular service)
Connecting tracks to 240th Street Yard
Kingsbridge and Riverdale		238th Street	local	1	August 1, 1908	
Kingsbridge and Riverdale	Disabled access	231st Street	local	1	August 1, 1908	
Manhattan
Marble Hill		Marble Hill–225th Street	local	1	January 14, 1907	Connection to Metro-North Railroad (Hudson Line) at Marble Hill
Broadway Bridge
Inwood		221st Street	local		March 12, 1906	Closed January 14, 1907
Inwood		215th Street	local	1	March 12, 1906	
Inwood	Connecting track to 207th Street Yard					
Inwood		207th Street	local	1	April 1, 1907	Bx12 Select Bus Service
Inwood	Center express track ends					
Inwood	Disabled access	Dyckman Street		1	March 12, 1906	
Washington Heights	Elevator access to mezzanine only	191st Street		1	January 14, 1911	
Washington Heights	Elevator access to mezzanine only	181st Street		1	May 30, 1906	
Washington Heights	Elevator access to mezzanine only	168th Street		1	April 14, 1906	IND Eighth Avenue Line (A C )
Washington Heights		157th Street		1	November 12, 1904	Bx6 Select Bus Service
Center express track begins (no regular service)
Harlem		145th Street	local	1	October 27, 1904	
Harlem	137th Street Yard tracks surround main line					
Harlem	Disabled access	137th Street–City College	local	1	October 27, 1904	
Harlem		125th Street	local	1	October 27, 1904	
Morningside Heights		116th Street–Columbia University	local	1	October 27, 1904	M60 Select Bus Service to LaGuardia Airport
Morningside Heights		Cathedral Parkway–110th Street	local	1	October 27, 1904	
Upper West Side		103rd Street	local	1	October 27, 1904	
Upper West Side	Center express track ends					
Upper West Side	IRT Lenox Avenue Line joins as the express tracks (2 3 )					
Upper West Side	Disabled access	96th Street	all	1 2 3	October 27, 1904	
Upper West Side		91st Street	local		October 27, 1904	Closed February 2, 1959
Upper West Side		86th Street	local	1 2	October 27, 1904	M86 Select Bus Service
Upper West Side		79th Street	local	1 2	October 27, 1904	M79 Select Bus Service
Upper West Side	Disabled access	72nd Street	all	1 2 3	October 27, 1904	
Upper West Side	Disabled access	66th Street–Lincoln Center	local	1 2	October 27, 1904	
Midtown	Disabled access	59th Street–Columbus Circle	local	1 2	October 27, 1904	IND Eighth Avenue Line (A B C D )
Midtown		50th Street	local	1 2	October 27, 1904	
Midtown	merge on northbound local track to IRT 42nd Street Line (no regular service)					
Midtown	Disabled access	Times Square–42nd Street	all	1 2 3	June 3, 1917	IRT Flushing Line (7 <7>); IND Eighth Avenue Line (A C E ) at 42nd Street–Port Authority Bus Terminal; BMT Broadway Line (N Q R W ) 42nd Street Shuttle (S ) IND Sixth Avenue Line (B D F <F> M ) at 42nd Street–Bryant Park, daytime only Port Authority Bus Terminal
Midtown	Disabled access	34th Street–Penn Station	all	1 2 3	June 3, 1917	Connection to Amtrak, LIRR, and N.J. Transit at Pennsylvania Station; M34 / M34A Select Bus Service
Chelsea		28th Street	local	1 2	July 1, 1918	
Chelsea		23rd Street	local	1 2	July 1, 1918	M23 Select Bus Service
Chelsea		18th Street	local	1 2	July 1, 1918	
Chelsea	Disabled access	14th Street	all	1 2 3	July 1, 1918	IND Sixth Avenue Line (F <F> M ) at 14th Street; BMT Canarsie Line (L ) at Sixth Avenue; Connection to PATH at 14th Street; M14A / M14D Select Bus Service
Greenwich Village		Christopher Street–Stonewall	local	1 2	July 1, 1918	
Greenwich Village		Houston Street	local	1 2	July 1, 1918	
TriBeCa		Canal Street	local	1 2	July 1, 1918	
TriBeCa		Franklin Street	local	1 2	July 1, 1918	
Financial District	Disabled access	Chambers Street	all	1 2 3	July 1, 1918	
Financial District	Express tracks split to Brooklyn Branch (2 3 ); Local tracks continue as Main line (1 )					
Financial District	Disabled access	WTC Cortlandt	local	1	July 1, 1918	Closed from September 11, 2001, to September 8, 2018, due to damage sustained in the September 11 attacks Connection to PATH at World Trade Center
Financial District		Rector Street	local	1	July 1, 1918	
Financial District	Split between Main line and Outer loop at South Ferry					
Financial District		South Ferry (Loop Platform)	outer loop		July 1, 1918	Closed on March 16, 2009, with the opening of the new terminal Reopened on April 4, 2013, as temporary terminal; closed again on June 27, 2017
Financial District	Disabled access	South Ferry (New Platform)	local	1	March 16, 2009	Closed November 2012 due to damage caused by Hurricane Sandy; reopened on June 27, 2017; BMT Broadway Line (N R W ) at Whitehall Street–South Ferry; M15 Select Bus Service; Staten Island Ferry at South Ferry
Main line terminates (1 )
Brooklyn Branch (2 3 )
Financial District	Elevator access to mezzanine only	Park Place	express	2 3	July 1, 1918	BMT Broadway Line (N R W ) at Cortlandt Street; IND Eighth Avenue Line (A C ) at Chambers Street; IND Eighth Avenue Line (E ) at World Trade Center; Connection to PATH at World Trade Center
Financial District	Disabled access	Fulton Street	express	2 3	July 1, 1918	IRT Lexington Avenue Line (4 5 ) IND Eighth Avenue Line (A C ) BMT Nassau Street Line (J Z ) Connection to PATH at World Trade Center
Financial District		Wall Street	express	2 3	July 1, 1918	
Brooklyn
Clark Street Tunnel
Brooklyn Heights	Elevator access to mezzanine only	Clark Street	express	2 3	April 15, 1919	
Downtown Brooklyn	Disabled access	Borough Hall	express	2 3	April 15, 1919	IRT Eastern Parkway Line (4 5 ) BMT Fourth Avenue Line (N R W ) at Court Street
becomes the local tracks of the IRT Eastern Parkway Line (2 3 )
