= Jackson Heights =

Neighborhood in New York City

- Neighborhood of Queens
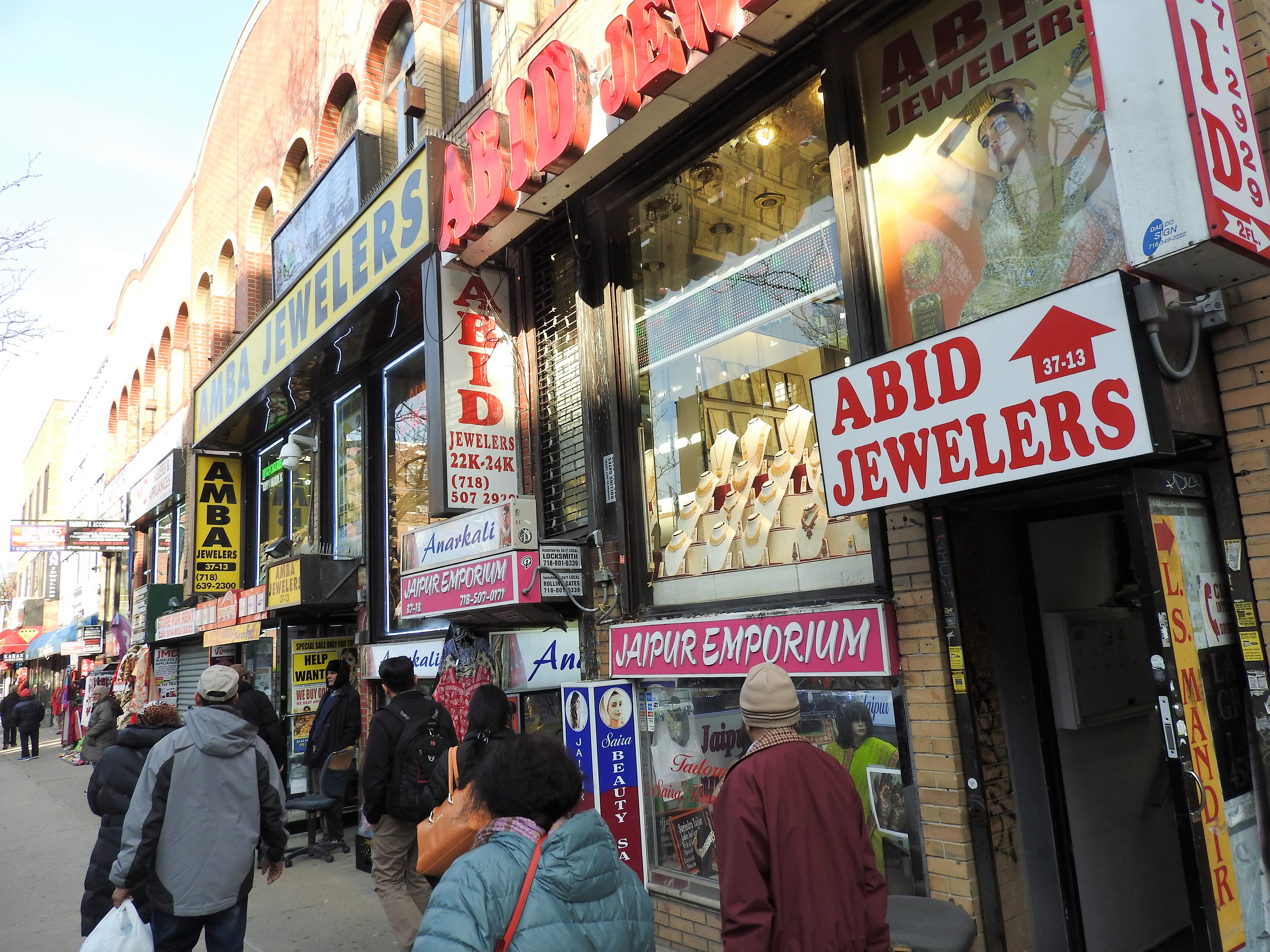
- Little India on 74th Street in Jackson Heights
- Location within New York City; Note: red area overlaps with East Elmhurst.
- Country: United States
- State: New York
- City: New York City
- Borough: Queens
- Community District: Queens 3

Population (2010)
  - Total: 108,152

Ethnicity
  - Hispanic: 49.2%
  - Asian: 26.5%
  - White: 16.4%
  - Black: 4.5%
  - Other/Multiracial: 3.4%
- Time zone: UTC−5 (EST)
  - Summer (DST): UTC−4 (EDT)
- ZIP Code: 11372 (primary) & 11370 (though often regarded more as part of East Elmhurst)
- Area codes: 718, 347, 929, 465, and 917

Jackson Heights is a neighborhood in the northwestern part of the borough of Queens in New York City. Jackson Heights is neighbored by North Corona to the east, Elmhurst to the south, Woodside to the west, and today northern Astoria (Ditmars-Steinway) to the northwest, and East Elmhurst to the north and northeast. Jackson Heights has an ethnically diverse community, with half the population having been foreign-born since the 2000s. The New York Times has called it "the most culturally diverse neighborhood in New York, if not on the planet." According to the 2010 United States census, the neighborhood has a population of 108,152.

The site of Jackson Heights was a vast marsh named Trains Meadow until 1909 when Edward A. MacDougall's Queensboro Corporation bought 325 acres (132 ha) of undeveloped land and farms. The Queensboro Corporation named the land Jackson Heights after Jackson Avenue, which was itself a namesake of John C. Jackson. A descendant of one of the earliest European families to settle in the borough, Jackson was a respected Queens entrepreneur. Jackson Avenue marked the northern border of the Queensboro Corporation's ambitious Garden City development. Further development arose through the development of transit and "garden apartments". "Garden homes" soon became prevalent in Jackson Heights. During the 1960s, Jackson Heights's white middle-class families began moving to the suburbs, and nonwhite residents began moving in.

Jackson Heights retains much of its residential character. It also has numerous commercial establishments clustered along 37th Avenue, as well as on several side streets served by subway stations. Most of the surviving garden city neighborhood is part of a national historic district called the Jackson Heights Historic District, which was listed on the National Register of Historic Places in 1999. A smaller part of the original garden city neighborhood was placed in a New York City historic district of the same name in 1993.

Jackson Heights is in Queens Community District 3 and its ZIP Code is 11372. The zip code 11370 is co-named with East Elmhurst. It is patrolled by the New York City Police Department's 115th Precinct. Politically, Jackson Heights is represented by the New York City Council's 21st and 25th districts.

== History ==
=== Early history ===
From colonial times to the 1900s, the area now known as Jackson Heights was a vast marsh named Trains Meadow. Urbanization at the turn of the century was creating a New York City housing shortage and urban sprawl.

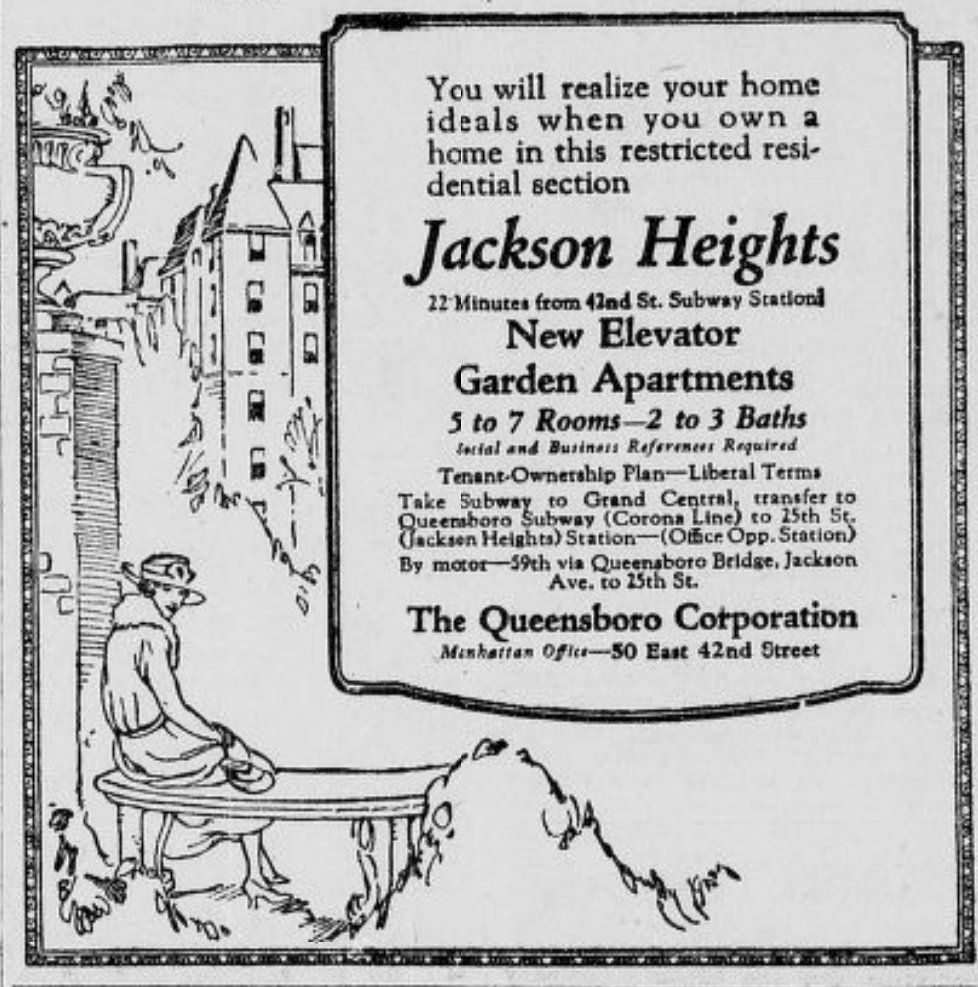
Jackson Heights Advertisement by The Queensboro Corporation

In 1909, Edward A. MacDougall's Queensboro Corporation bought 325 acres (132 ha) of undeveloped land and farms and christened them Jackson Heights after John C. Jackson, a descendant of one of the original Queens families and a respected Queens County entrepreneur.

Northern Boulevard, a major east-west thoroughfare traversing Northern Queens and roughly bisecting Jackson Heights, was originally named Jackson Avenue; a short stretch of the boulevard retains that name at its western Terminus in Long Island City. Though the land was not known for its elevation, after the land was filled to raise the terrain above the marshes of the Trains Meadow, Jackson Heights attained the highest elevation in the vicinity. The addition of the term "Heights" echoed the prestige of the neighborhood of Brooklyn Heights and indicated that Jackson Heights was meant to be an exclusive neighborhood. At that time the area could most easily be reached by ferry from Manhattan or the Brooklyn Bridge. More direct access came with the Queensboro Bridge in 1909, This was followed by the elevated IRT Flushing Line—the present-day 7 train, just 20 minutes from Midtown Manhattan—in 1917, and the Fifth Avenue Coach Company double-decker coaches in 1922.

=== Development ===
Jackson Heights was conceived as a planned development for middle- to upper-middle-income workers looking to escape an overcrowded Manhattan. Inspired by Sir Ebenezer Howard's garden city movement, it was laid out by Edward MacDougall's Queensboro Corporation in 1916 and began attracting residents after the arrival of the Flushing Line in 1917. The Queensboro Corporation coined the name "garden apartment" to convey the concept of apartments built around private parks. Although land for churches was provided, the apartments were limited to White Anglo-Saxon Protestants, excluding Jews, Blacks, and perhaps Greeks and Italians.

Several Jackson Heights buildings were built by the Queensboro Corporation as part of a planned community a few blocks from the Flushing Line between Northern Boulevard (then Jackson Avenue) and 37th Avenue, the main commercial corridor of the new development. Targeted at the middle class, these multi-story apartment buildings designed in the Colonial Revival and neo-Tudor styles were based on similar ones in Berlin. They were to share garden spaces, have ornate exteriors and features such as fireplaces, parquet floors, sun rooms, and built-in bathtubs with showers; and be cooperatively owned. In addition, the corporation divided the land into blocks and building lots, as well as installed streets, sidewalks, and power, water, and sewage lines.

The Laurel apartment building on 82nd Street at Northern Boulevard was the first of Jackson Heights's Queensboro Corporation buildings, completed in 1914 with a small courtyard. The Greystones on either side of 80th Street between 37th and 35th avenues were completed in 1918 with a design by architect George H. Wells. Leftover unused space was converted to parks, gardens, and recreational areas, including a golf course; much of this space, including the golf course, no longer exists. This was followed by the 1919 construction of the Andrew J. Thomas–designed Linden Court, a 10-building complex between 84th Street, 85th Street, 37th Avenue, and Roosevelt Avenue. The two sets of five buildings, separated by a gated garden with linden trees and two pathways, included parking spaces with single-story garages accessed via narrow driveways, the first Jackson Heights development to do so; gaps at regular intervals in the perimeter wall; a layout that provided light and ventilation to the apartments and fostered a sense of belonging to a community; the area's first co-op; and now-prevalent private gardens surrounded by the building blocks.

The Hampton Gardens, the Château, and the Towers followed in the 1920s. The Château and the Towers, both co-ops on 34th Avenue, had large, airy apartments and elevators. Until 1922, elevators were required to have attendants and more modest buildings were constructed as walk-ups not exceeding five floors. The elegant Château cooperative apartment complex, with 12 buildings surrounding a shared garden, was built in the French Renaissance style and has slate mansard roofs pierced by dormer windows, and diaperwork brick walls. At first purely decorative, the shared gardens in later developments included paved spaces where people could meet or sit. The Queensboro Corporation started the Ivy Court, Cedar Court, and Spanish Gardens projects, all designed by Thomas, in 1924.

The Queensboro Corporation advertised their apartments from 1922 on. On August 28, 1922, the Queensboro Corporation paid $50 to radio station WEAF to broadcast a ten-minute sales pitch for apartments in Jackson Heights, in what may have been the first "infomercial", opening with a few words about Nathaniel Hawthorne before promoting the corporation's Nathaniel Hawthorne apartments. The ad wanted viewers to:

seek the recreation and the daily comfort of the home removed from the congested part of the city, right at the boundaries of God's great outdoors, and within a few minutes by subway from the business section of Manhattan ... The cry of the heart is for more living room, more chance to unfold, more opportunity to get near Mother Earth, to play, to romp, to plant and to dig ... Let me enjoin upon you as you value your health and your hopes and your home happiness, get away from the solid masses of brick ... where your children grow up starved for a run over a patch of grass and the sight of a tree ...

Built in 1928, the English Gables line 82nd Street, the main shopping area of Jackson Heights's Hispanic community. There are two developments, English Gables I and II; they are meant to provide a gateway to the neighborhood for commercial traffic and for passengers from the 82nd Street–Jackson Heights station. A year later, the Robert Morris Apartments, on 37th Avenue between 79th and 80th streets, were constructed. Named after Robert Morris, a signer of the United States Declaration of Independence, the apartments have ample green spaces, original high ceilings, and fireplaces, and are relatively expensive.

During the Depression, two new buildings were built: Ravenna Court on 37th Avenue between 80th and 81st streets, built in 1929; and Georgian Court three blocks east, between 83rd and 84th streets, built in 1930. The Queensboro Corporation began to build on land that until then had been kept open for community use, including the tennis courts, community garden, and the former golf course—between 76th and 78th streets and 34th and 37th avenues—all of which were built upon during the 1940s and 1950s. The corporation also began erecting traditional six-story apartment buildings. Dunolly Gardens, the last garden apartment Thomas designed, was an exception, a modernistic group of six buildings completed in 1939. The corner windows, considered innovative in the 1930s, gave the apartments a more spacious feel, and the landscaped interior courtyard is one of the historic district's largest. After the 1940s, Jackson Heights's real estate was diversified, with more apartment buildings and cooperatives built with elevators including Donner Gardens, Monroe House, Versailles and Saxony Towers. Some new transportation infrastructure was also built.

In 1929, Holmes Airport opened in the northern section of Jackson Heights that is also considered part of East Elmhurst. Bordering St. Michaels Cemetery to the west, the airfield was also called the Grand Central Air Terminal and Grand Central Airport. Holmes Airport shut down in 1940, one year after LaGuardia Airport opened.

=== Social and demographic shifts ===
The neighborhood grew steadily from the 1920s to the 1950s, with construction slowing during the Depression and booming back again after World War II. Holmes Airport operated from 1929 to 1940 on 220 acres (89 ha) adjacent to the community. Later, its land became veterans' housing and the Bulova watch factory site.

==== Ethnic tensions ====
By 1930, artists from the Manhattan theater district, many of whom were homosexual, had moved into the area, forming the beginnings of the second largest LGBTQ community in New York outside of Manhattan. Jews were allowed to move in by the 1940s. In the 1950s, middle-class businessmen from Colombia, escaping violence and repression in Latin America, brought their financial capital and their families to the community. Following the development of Long Island in the 1960s, Jackson Heights' white middle-class families began moving further out into the suburbs. At the same time the neighborhood experienced an influx of ethnically diverse professionals from Latin America and the Indian subcontinent taking advantage of the 1965 Immigration Reform Act, which allowed them to arrange the immigration of their families. White residents' resistance to integration with African-Americans continued late into the decade, and Junction Boulevard came to be called the "Mason-Dixon Line", as it divided Jackson Heights from the black communities in East Elmhurst and Corona.

==== Crime increases ====
By the mid-1970s, Roosevelt Avenue had become the neighborhood's commercial center and also gained national attention as a place for organized crime. A 1993 New York Times article detailed how wire transfer services in Jackson Heights inadvertently enabled Colombian cartels to repatriate, and in the process launder, millions of dollars in drug money to South America alongside customers who used the service to transfer legally earned money. The violence that ensued as a result of the growing Jackson Heights illegal drug trade is described in this excerpt from a 1978 New York magazine article titled "Gunfights in the Cocaine Corral":

Over the past three years, in this nice, quiet neighborhood, 27 people have been killed and dozens have been injured.... The violence spreads to surround neighborhoods as cops and prosecutors fight a losing battle. Double and triple homicides go unsolved.

By the late 1980s, Jackson Heights had rising real-estate values and a moderate amount of crime compared to other city neighborhoods. Nevertheless, there were still high-profile crimes that reinforced perceptions of the neighborhood as dangerous. In 1990, Julio Rivera, a gay Puerto Rican man, was murdered in a hate crime. His death galvanized the LGBTQ community into protesting his death with a candlelight vigil, the formation of several LGBTQ activist groups, and the foundation of the Queens Pride Parade. Two years later, journalist Manuel de Dios Unanue was murdered after authoring articles in El Diario La Prensa about the proliferation of Colombian cartels embedded within the business community along Roosevelt Avenue. Seeking to distance themselves from the portrayal of Jackson Heights as a crime-ridden neighborhood, some residents argued that de Dios had been murdered in Elmhurst, as the restaurant where he was attacked was on the south side of Roosevelt Avenue.

Following the reduction of crime in New York City during the late 1990s, the market for illicit substances that fed the Colombian cocaine industry in Jackson Heights eventually decreased, leading to a reduction in cartels in the neighborhood.

=== Revitalization and 21st century ===
Community leaders responded to negative perceptions of Jackson Heights by seeking to have the neighborhood designated a historic district. In 1988, the Jackson Heights Beautification Group was formed; it organized walking tours as well as beautification activities and commissioned a neighborhood history. Five years later, part of Jackson Heights was made a New York City historic district. The designation, which set architectural guidelines for structures within the designated district, affected both existing buildings and planned new developments within the district.

Starting in the 2000s, Jackson Heights has become once again an area that many professionals and middle-class families consider desirable to live in. Some of these residents moved to Jackson Heights for the unique architecture of its buildings, or for its cultural diversity.

== Land use ==
=== Historic district ===
- Jackson Heights Historic District
- U.S. National Register of Historic Places
- U.S. Historic district
- NYC Landmark
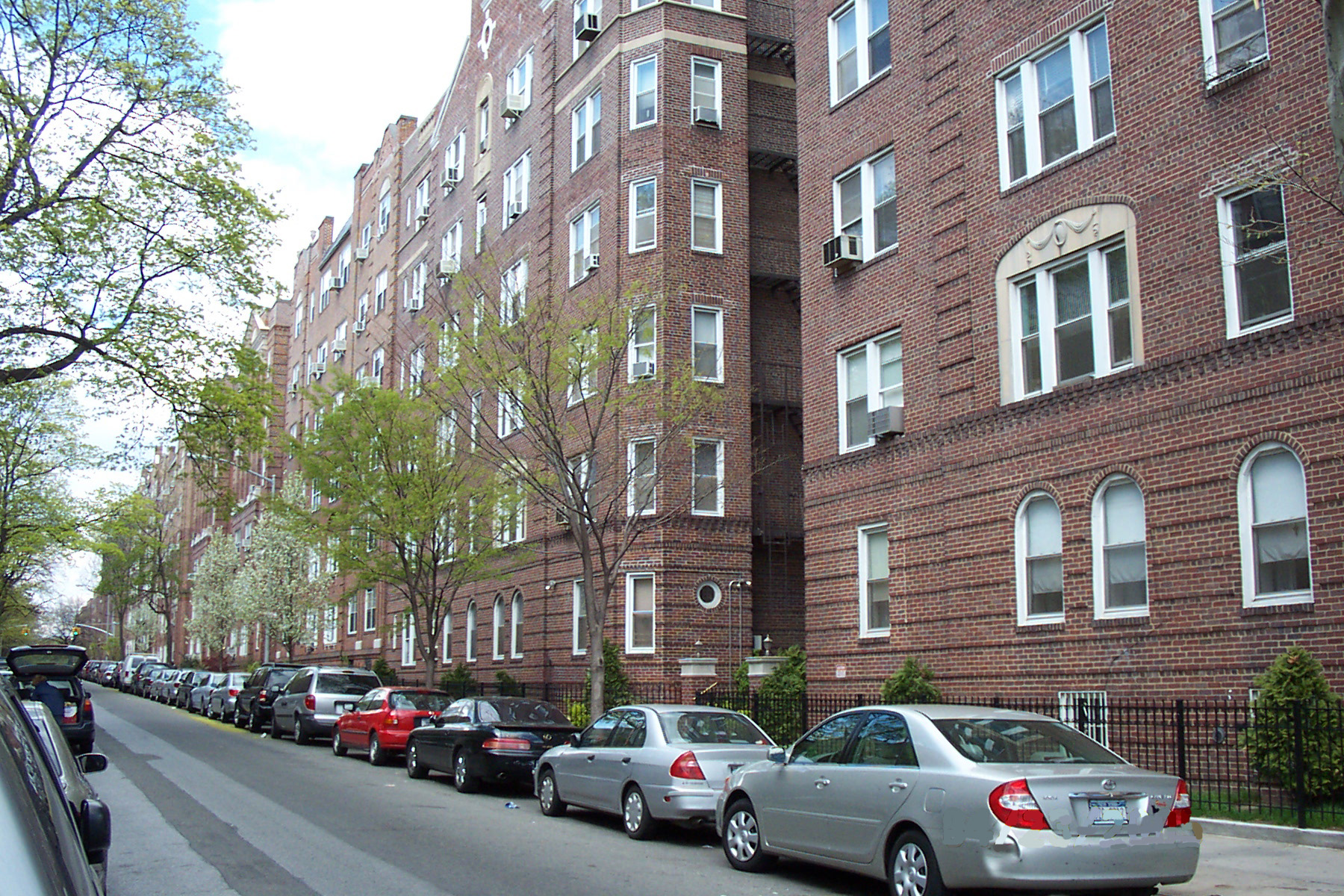
- Residential street in Jackson Heights
- District position on New York City map
- Location: Bounded by Roosevelt Ave., Broadway, Leverich St., 70 St., Northern Blvd., and Junction Blvd., Queens, NYC
- Coordinates: 40°45′5″N 73°53′13″W
- Area: 300 acres (120 ha)
- Architectural style: Late 19th and 20th Century Revivals
- NRHP reference No.: 99000059
- NYCL No.: 1831

Significant dates
- Added to NRHP: January 27, 1999
- Designated NYCL: October 19, 1993

Most of the original neighborhood, comprising the garden city apartment buildings, was made a National Register Historic District and a New York State Historic Register District. The Jackson Heights New York State and National Register Districts range from 93rd Street through 69th Street between Northern Boulevard and Roosevelt Avenue. Some property fronting on Northern Boulevard and Roosevelt Avenue, as well as some "cut-outs", are not inside the Register Districts. The national historic district called the Jackson Heights Historic District, includes 2,203 contributing buildings, 19 contributing sites, and three contributing objects. Among the landmarked buildings, over 200 original Queensboro Corporation apartment buildings still exist in Jackson Heights. It was listed on the National Register of Historic Places in 1999.

Almost 600 buildings in the neighborhood—a rectangle stretching roughly from 76th to 88th Streets and from Roosevelt Avenue almost up to Northern Boulevard—were designated as a New York City Historic District by the New York City Landmarks Preservation Commission on October 19, 1993. It comprises large apartment buildings with private communal gardens, as well as many groupings of private homes and many stores on the streets surrounding Roosevelt Avenue. Unlike the State and National Districts, the local designation comes with aesthetic protections.

In addition to the Jackson Heights Historic District, the Lent Homestead and Cemetery and Jackson Heights post office are listed on the National Register of Historic Places.

=== Business district ===
The main retail thoroughfare is 37th Avenue from 72nd Street to Junction Boulevard, with more retail on 73rd, 74th, and 82nd streets between 37th and Roosevelt avenues. Stores and restaurants on and near 74th Street tend to cater to the large population from the Indian subcontinent in the neighborhood, with sari and jewelry stores, Indian and Bengali music and movie retailers and many restaurants. 37th Avenue contains a wide mix of retailers, including many grocery stores, and 82nd Street contains many national chain stores located in Tudor-style buildings in the Jackson Heights Historic District. South American retailers and eateries, predominantly from Colombia and Peru dominate Northern Boulevard from 80th Street east to the border of neighboring Corona at Junction Boulevard. Roosevelt Avenue is also lined with various mainly Hispanic retail stores.

==== Street food ====
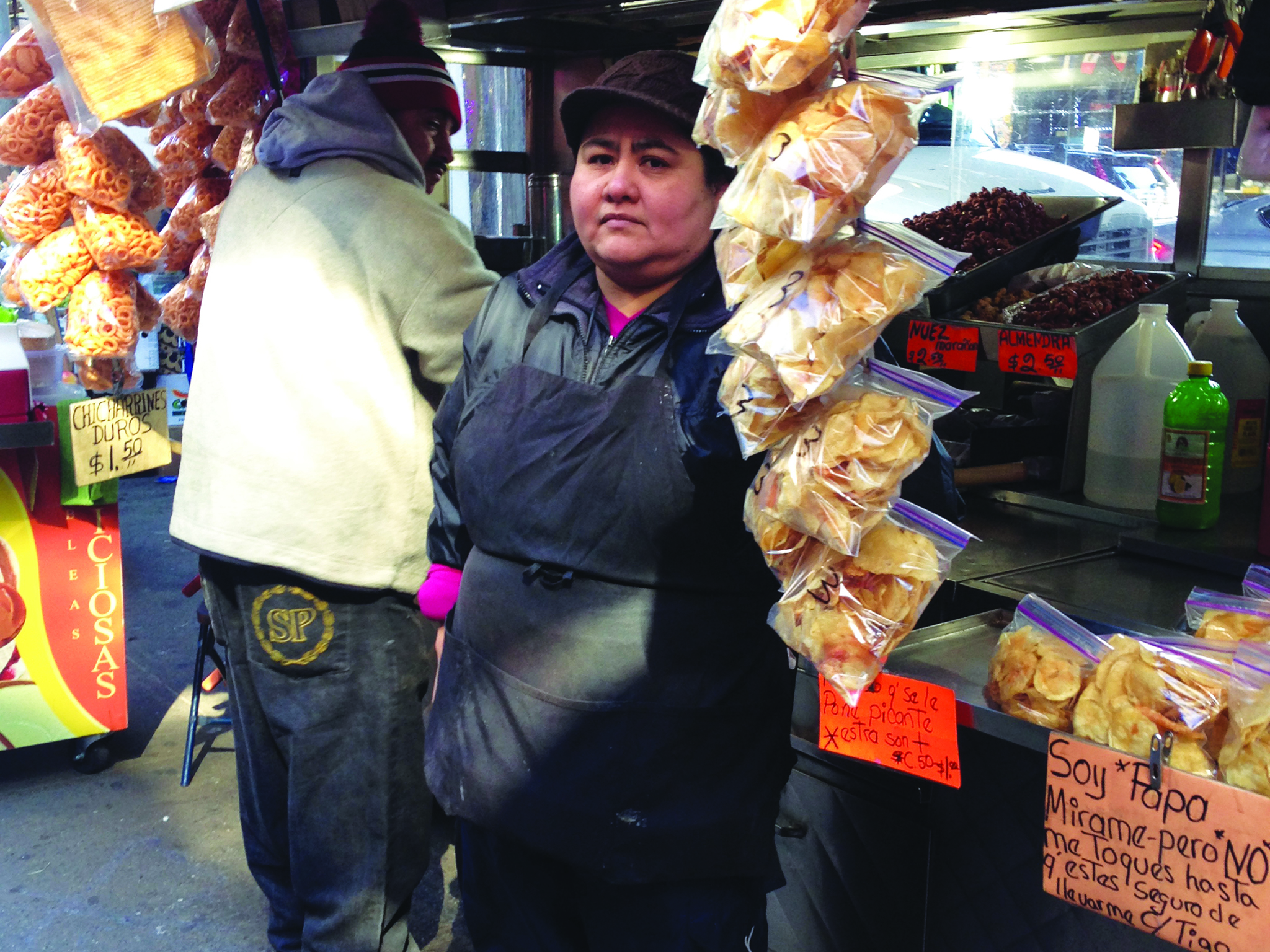
Street vendor in Jackson Heights

Along Roosevelt Avenue from 74th to 108th Streets, street food from all over the world is made and sold at food carts "currently dominated by the Mexican community". Typical cart food includes Bengali fuchka (phuchka), Middle Eastern lamb over rice, Nepalese momo, Colombian chuzos and arepas, Greek souvlaki, Ecuadorian ceviche, Thai steamed chicken over rice, and Mexican elotes (corn on a cob), tacos, homemade tamales filled with meats, cheese, fruits or even chilies, fruit batidos or aguas frescas (smoothies), and South American sweet churros.

In a 2017 episode of his show Parts Unknown, American chef Anthony Bourdain visited several Queens eateries, profiling Evelia Coyotzi, who sells tamales in a street cart on Junction Boulevard, the border between Jackson Heights and Corona. Bourdain learned about Coyotzi, a Mexican immigrant who spoke no English, through the Street Vendor Project, which advocates for New York City street vendors.

=== Other buildings ===
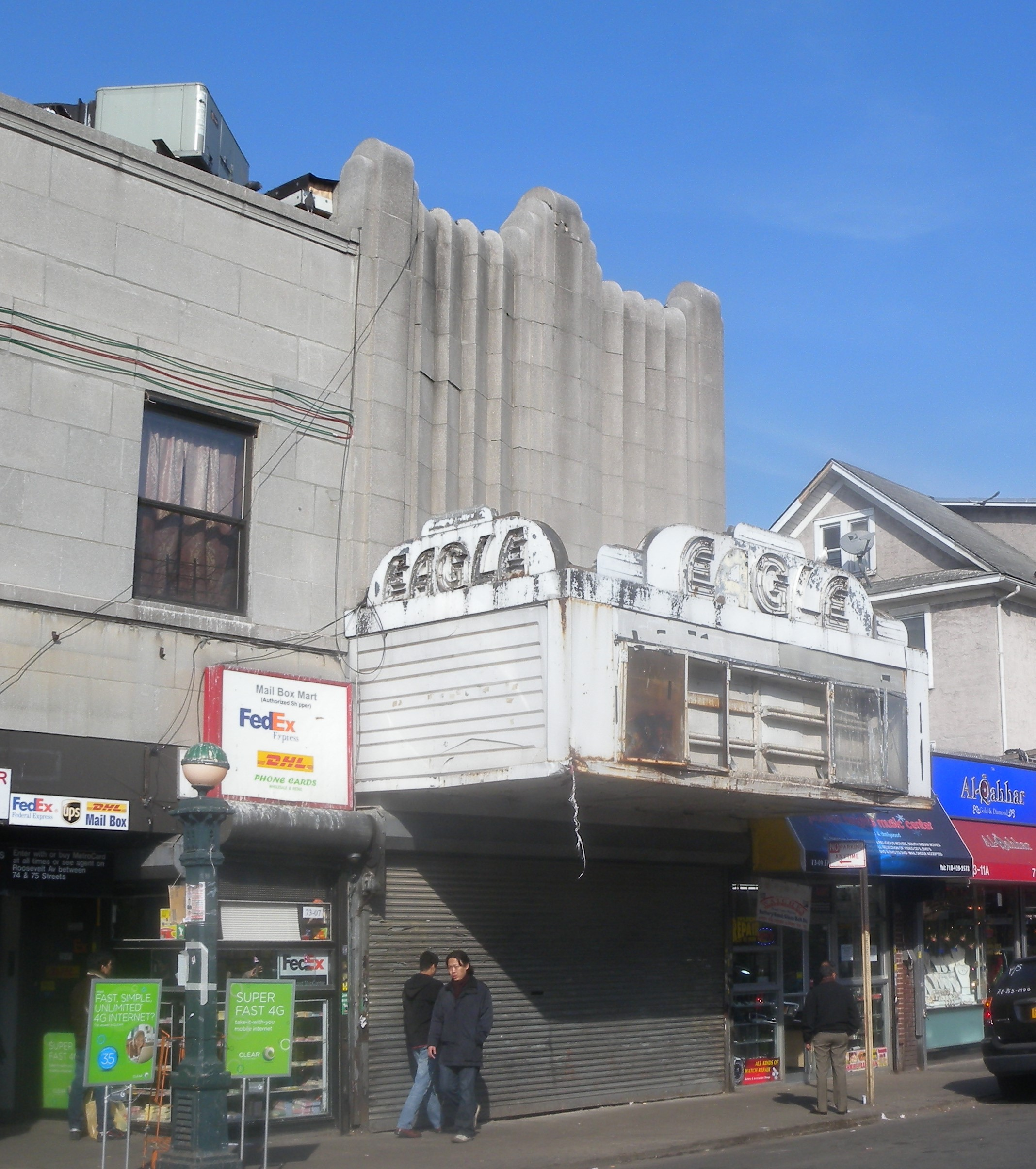
Eagle Theater

Most housing units in Jackson Heights are apartments in multi-unit buildings, many of which are five or six stories. Many of these buildings are co-ops, some are rentals, and a few are condominiums. There are also a number of one- to three-family houses, most of which are attached row houses. 34th and 35th avenues, as well as most side streets between 37th Avenue and Northern Boulevard, are residential. A section of 90th Street between 30th Avenue and Northern Boulevard was privately developed separately from the Queensboro Corporation. The structures on that stretch of 90th Street are mostly Tudor buildings.

There were five historic movie theaters in Jackson Heights, which have all been either repurposed or closed. The Art Deco Earle Theater, opened in 1936 on 37th Road between 73rd and 74th streets, was a neighborhood movie theater before becoming a porn theater and then, with the name changed to "Eagle", a Bollywood theater before a strike in the Bollywood industry caused the theater to close permanently in 2009; it is now a food court selling cuisine of the Indian subcontinent. The Fair Theatre, in the area that overlaps with East Elmhurst, opened in 1939 at Astoria Boulevard and 90th Street, became a porn theater. The Polk Theater, on 37th (formerly Polk) Avenue and 93rd Street, opened in 1938 and closed in 2006; it also was a porn theater during its later years, before it was demolished in 2008. The Colony Theater, on 82nd Street north of Roosevelt Avenue, opened in 1935 and closed in 1991. The Jackson, later an Indian-owned theater called the Jackson Heights Cinema, on 82nd Street south of Roosevelt Avenue, was demolished in March 2017. The Boulevard Theater, on Northern Boulevard and 83rd Street, is now a Latin-American restaurant of the same name.

== Demographics ==
Based on data from the 2010 United States census, the population of Jackson Heights was 108,152, a decrease of 5,175 (4.6%) from the 113,327 counted in 2000. Covering an area of 1,101.36 acres (445.70 ha), the neighborhood had a population density of 98.2 inhabitants per acre (62,800/sq mi; 24,300/km^{2}). The racial makeup of the neighborhood was 17.2% (18,567) White, 2.0% (2,210) African American, 0.1% (145) Native American, 22.0% (23,781) Asian, 0.0% (9) Pacific Islander, 0.5% (583) from other races, and 1.6% (1,736) from two or more races. Hispanic or Latino of any race were 56.5% (61,121) of the population.

The entirety of Queens Community District 3, which comprises Jackson Heights as well as East Elmhurst and North Corona, had 179,844 inhabitants as of NYC Health's 2018 Community Health Profile, with an average life expectancy of 84.7 years. This is higher than the median life expectancy of 81.2 for all New York City neighborhoods. Most inhabitants are middle-aged adults and youth: 22% are between the ages of 0–17, 32% between 25 and 44, and 24% between 45 and 64. The ratio of college-aged and elderly residents was lower, at 9% and 12% respectively.

As of 2017, the median household income in Community Board 3 was $56,601. In 2018, an estimated 25% of Jackson Heights residents lived in poverty, compared to 19% in all of Queens and 20% in all of New York City. One in fourteen residents (7%) were unemployed, compared to 8% in Queens and 9% in New York City. Rent burden, or the percentage of residents who have difficulty paying their rent, is 59% in Jackson Heights, slightly higher than the boroughwide and citywide rates of 53% and 51% respectively. Based on this calculation, as of 2018, Jackson Heights is considered to be high-income relative to the rest of the city and not gentrifying.

As of 2017, nearly 11% of households in Jackson Heights were severely overcrowded—defined as households in which there are more than 1.5 household members for each room (excluding bathrooms) in the unit—making it the second most overcrowded neighborhood in the city, behind only Elmhurst.

The 2020 census data from New York City Department of City Planning showed that there were 54,300 Hispanic residents, 27,600 Asian residents, there were between 10,000 to 19,999 White residents and less than 5000 Black residents. As of 2024, 77.6% of households in Jackson Heights and Elmhurst reported speaking a language other than English at home, with Spanish predominant.

== Culture ==
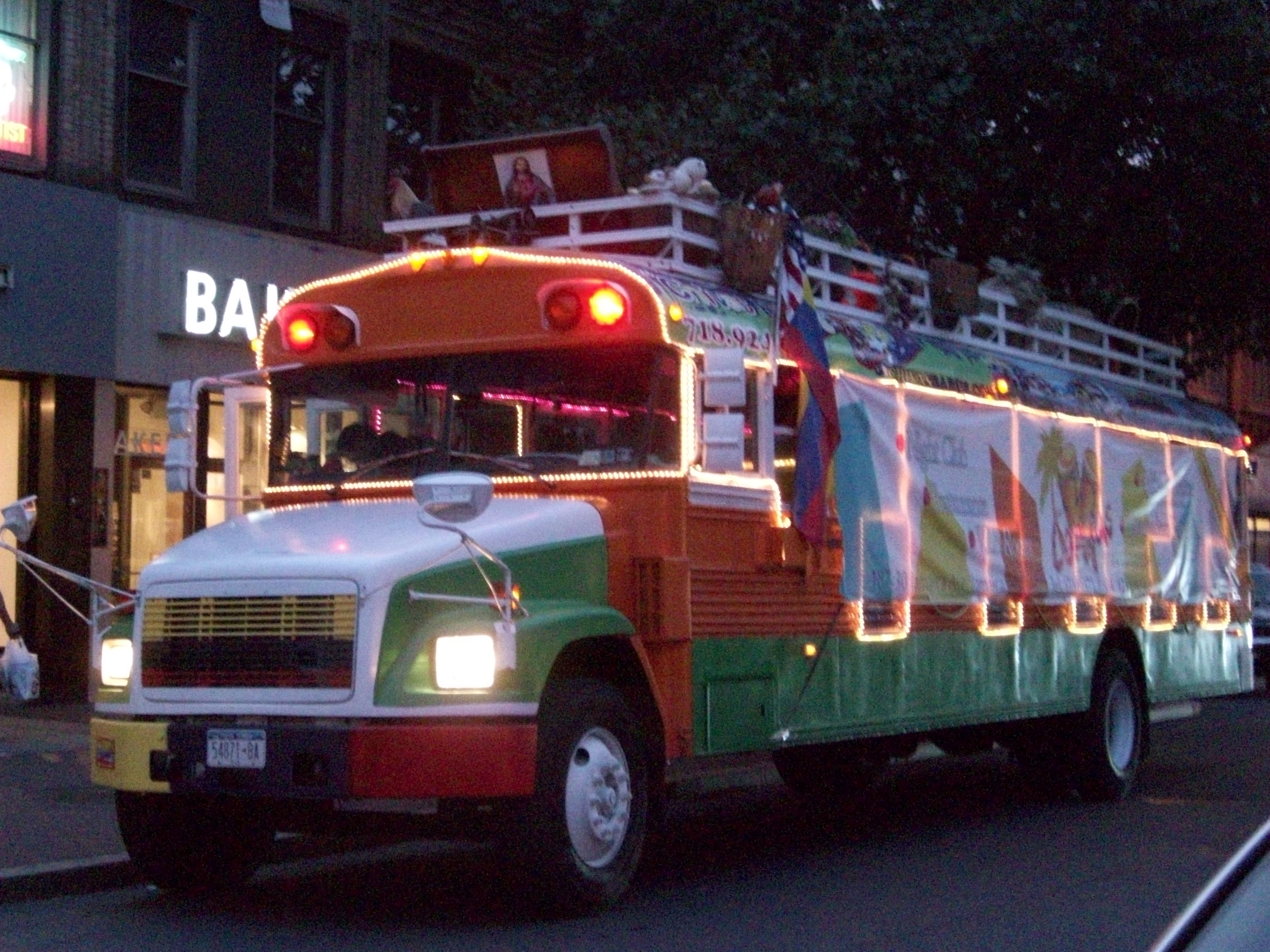
Chiva Bus during Colombian Independence celebration

Jackson Heights is among the most diverse neighborhoods in New York City and the nation. Half of the population was foreign-born by the 2000s. It is home to large numbers of South Americans (particularly Colombian, Ecuadorian and Argentinian) and South Asians (Bangladeshis, Pakistanis, Tibetans, Nepalese, and Indians). In November 2021, Shekar Krishnan was elected to represent the district on the New York City Council, becoming one of the first Councilmembers of South Asian descent. Because of its large and vibrant Tibetan community, Jackson Heights has been called "the second (if unofficial) capital of the exile Tibetan world, after Dharamsala, India." Most businesses are Asian and Latino-owned, and there are restaurants, bakeries, specialty shops, legal offices, bars, and beauty salons. There is a Little India on 74th Street and a Little Pakistan and Little Bangladesh on 73rd Street. There is also a large concentration of South Americans east of 77th Street, especially a Little Colombia along 37th Avenue.

Jackson Heights was heavily Colombian during the 1980s, but other immigrant groups have settled in the area, notably Mexicans. Many of the displaced Colombians have moved to adjacent areas such as Elmhurst, East Elmhurst, Corona, College Point and Flushing. Queens County still has the largest concentration of Colombians in the United States of any county (roughly 135,000).

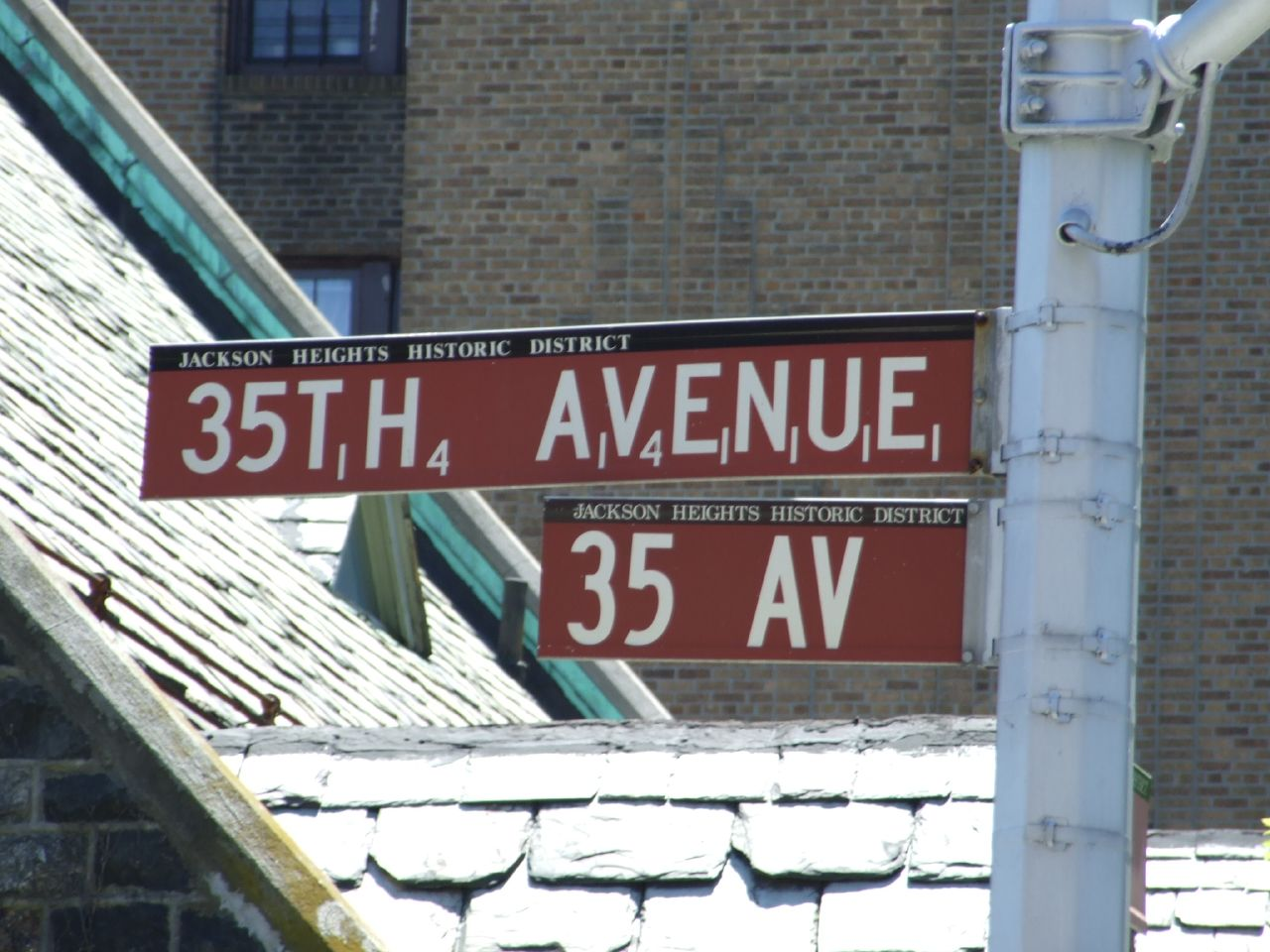
Scrabble street sign

The 2015 documentary In Jackson Heights portrays Jackson Heights as a microcosm of the American melting pot.

The word game Scrabble was co-invented by former architect Alfred Mosher Butts, who lived in Jackson Heights. There is a street sign at 35th Avenue and 81st Street that is stylized using letters, with their values in Scrabble as a subscript; it was originally erected in 1995, but after the sign disappeared in 2008, a replacement was put up in 2011.

=== Community organizations ===
The Jackson Heights Garden City Society is a historical society, whose founders include local historians, the Queens Borough Historian and local activists. They created and oversee the Jackson Heights Garden City Trail and publish a walking guidebook to Jackson Heights. They also collect artifacts of the community. Periodically, the Society testifies before the New York City Landmarks Preservation Commission on issues of concern to the community.

The 82nd Street Partnership is responsible for the business improvement of the area.

In addition, Colombian broadcaster RCN TV has its US-American headquarters in the neighborhood, reflecting the sizable Colombian population in the area.

There is a year-round greenmarket every Sunday morning at Travers Park, as well as various family-oriented spring and summer concerts.

=== LGBTQ community ===
==== Early history ====
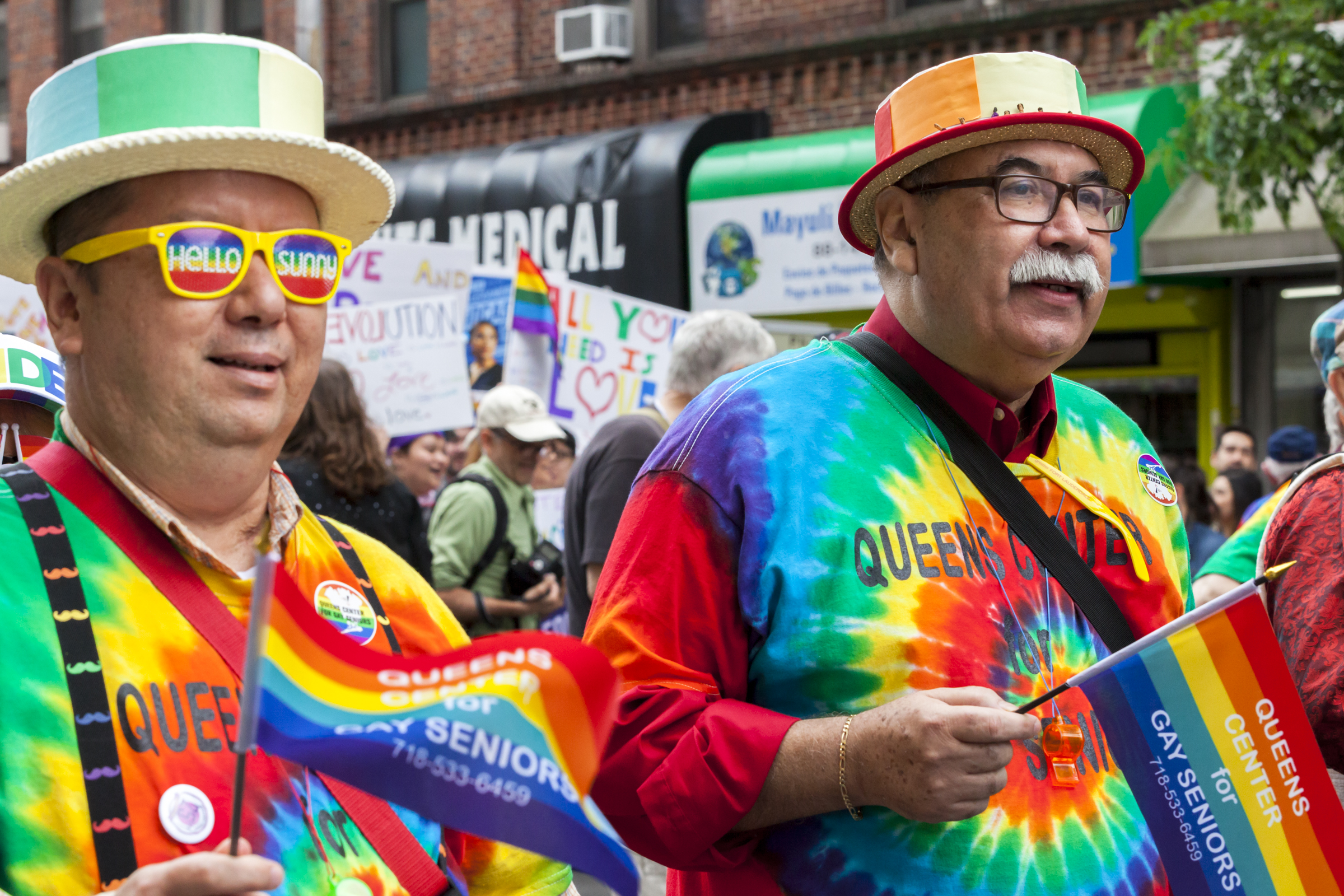
Senior Citizens marching in the 2018 Queens Pride Parade

In the 1920s, LGBT actors working in the 42nd Street theater scene decided to make their homes in Jackson Heights due to the lack of affordability of Manhattan neighborhoods and the easy accessibility of the 7 train. That was the beginning of what is now the second largest gay community in New York City.

Until the 1990s, LGBT activities in Jackson Heights were usually held surreptitiously and at night due to a constant fear of backlash. As the neighborhood continued to grow, more spaces for the gay community were added. One of those was the Queens Center for Gay Seniors, which was created using grant money and is still the only senior center in Queens serving the LGBT community specifically.

==== Murder of Julio Rivera ====
The LGBT community of Jackson Heights organized into a broader movement following the 1990 murder of Julio Rivera, a 29-year-old bartender who worked at the Magic Touch gay bar. Rivera was raised in the Bronx, but tried to avoid the violence of the streets there, and moved to Jackson Heights as a young adult. On the night of July 2, three men cornered Rivera in a schoolyard that was known as a gay cruising area and beat him with a hammer and beer bottle, and then stabbed him. At the beginning of the case, the police department categorized the assault as drug-related, because Rivera had been a cocaine user and they found traces of cocaine on his body. However, after Rivera's friends and relatives advocated for the case to be examined further (with his sister stating that Rivera obtained drugs via phone), the NYPD concluded that Rivera's death had been an anti-gay crime, and the three men involved were charged with murder and manslaughter.

If it wasn't for Julio the Queens LGBT movement would not have gotten as far as it has gotten. Julio did not die in vain. He changed people's lives.

— City Councilmember Daniel Dromm, 2015

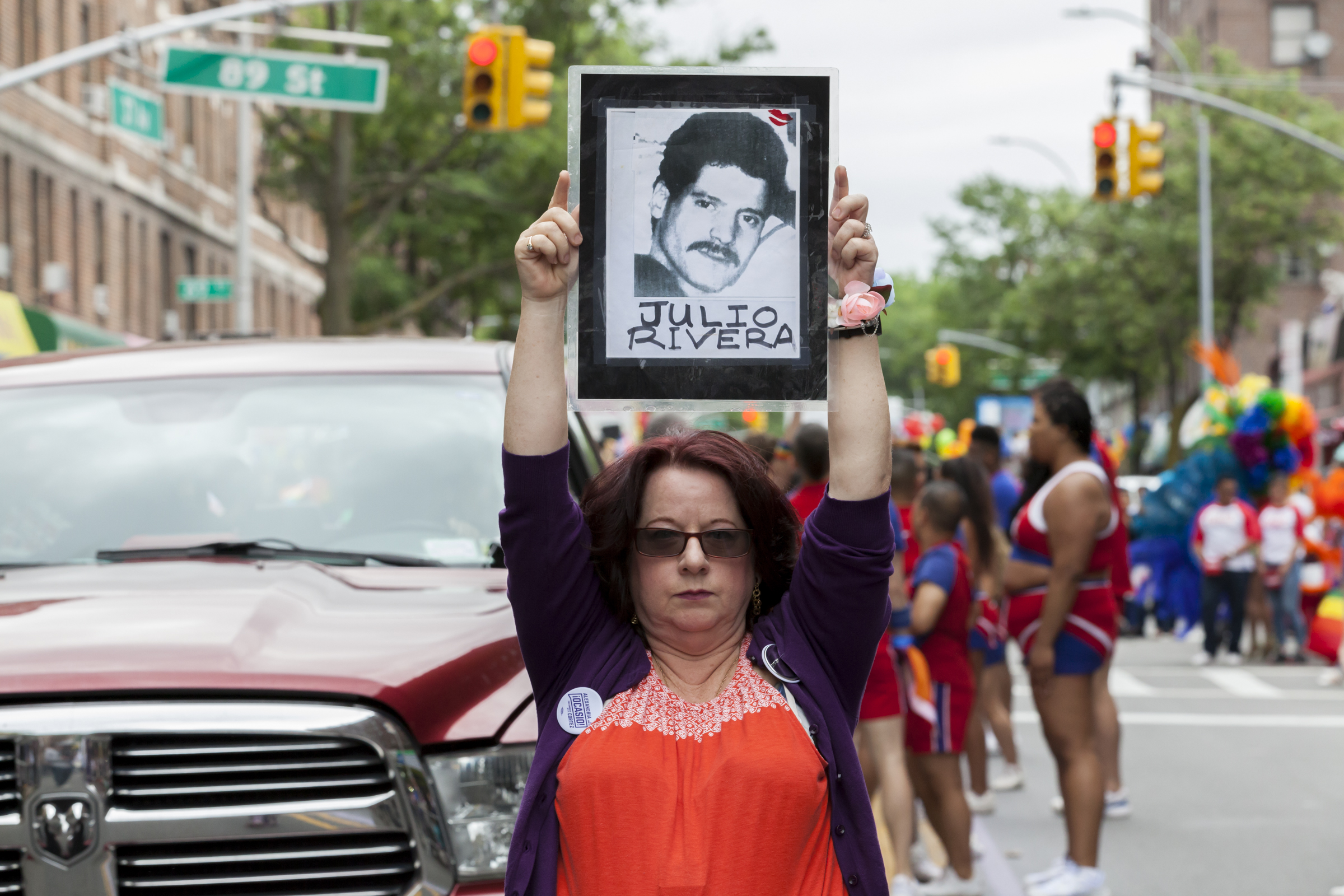
Julio Rivera

This was the first real standing for justice and honor for the LGBT community in Queens. The resulting activism led to the Gay and Lesbian Anti-Violence Project, a social services agency that helps monitor any type of criminal acts against the community citywide. Rivera's sister-in-law was elected as the AVP for the LGBT board. Union helped improve the relationship between the Police Department and Jackson Heights's LGBT community and helped with supervision against violence. In 2000, the corner of 78th Street and 37th Avenue, where Rivera was killed, was renamed in his memory and a documentary, Julio of Jackson Heights, was made about his murder.

==== 1990s to present ====
Since the 1990s, the LGBTQ community in Jackson Heights has not only grown in number, but also expanded its diversity and cultures. The Inaugural Queens Lesbian and Gay Parade and Block Party Festival, organized by Daniel Dromm and Maritza Martinez, took place on June 6, 1993, in Jackson Heights, marking a watershed in LGBTQ history. Some 1,000 marchers participated, and thousands of spectators attended. More than a dozen LGBTQ organizations sponsored the event. In 1994 Dromm and activist Wayne Mahlke organized the Lesbian and Gay Democratic Club of Queens, "the only LGBT independent Democratic club in the Borough of Queens." That same year, the Queens Pride Parade commemorated the 25th anniversary of the Stonewall riots. In 1995, Ed Sedarbaum established the SAGE/Queens Clubhouse, the first senior citizens program in Queens to provide outreach to LGBTQ elderly. In 1999, an estimated 40,000 people attend the Queens Pride Parade with some 70 community groups registered.

Daniel Dromm and Jimmy Van Bramer were elected to the New York City Council on November 3, 2009, representing, respectively, the 25th and 26th districts in Queens. Both are openly gay.

===== Incidents =====
On August 15, 2001, Edgar Garzon, a gay man, was murdered in an incident that the Queens district attorney characterized as a "possible hate crime." The murder quickly faded from public attention after the September 11 attacks a month later. In 2006, John L. McGhee was charged with Garzon's murder.

On June 3, 2018, 25-year-old school teacher Brandon Soriano was attacked by two men following the 2018 Pride Parade in what has been deemed a hate crime. Five days later, a Latina transgender woman was allegedly stabbed repeatedly a few blocks away.

== Economy ==
US-Bangla Airlines formerly had its U.S. offices in the Bangladesh Plaza building in Jackson Heights.

Between 2009 and 2018, Jackson Heights experienced a significant economic boom. In 2017, it was reported that taxable business sales increased to $473 million, a 72% increase from 2009. By 2018, there were approximately 3,300 businesses in the neighborhood, a 25% increase from 2009.

The poverty rate in Jackson Heights and East Elmhurst was 14.5% in 2024. The median property value was $642,400. The largest sources of employment in the area were construction, restaurants and food services, and elementary and secondary schools.

== Parks and recreation ==
Open patio area at Travers Park

Stone pathways at Travers Park

Panoramic view of grassy area in Travers Park

Travers Park is the main local playground. It has a variety of sports, including basketball, tennis, baseball, soccer, and handball. In recent years, a farmers' market was expanded to a year-round presence. Renovations completed in October 2020 eliminated much of the space previously used for sports, and replaced it with lawn and seating space.

Prior to expansion, the P.S. 69 school yard offered baseball fields, a stickball field, a handball court and three tennis courts. Con Edison sponsored several summer tennis camps at P.S. 69's school yard from 1982 to 1992. In 1998, P.S. 69 built an annex to compensate for the booming population of children in Jackson Heights and the public access to the school yard was removed. On November 30, 2011, then-Mayor Michael Bloomberg and other city officials opened the 200th "Schoolyard to Playground" at P.S. 69 as a part of the PlaNYC initiative to ensure all New Yorkers live within a 10-minute walk of a park or playground; the program is turning schoolyards into playgrounds in neighborhoods across the city.

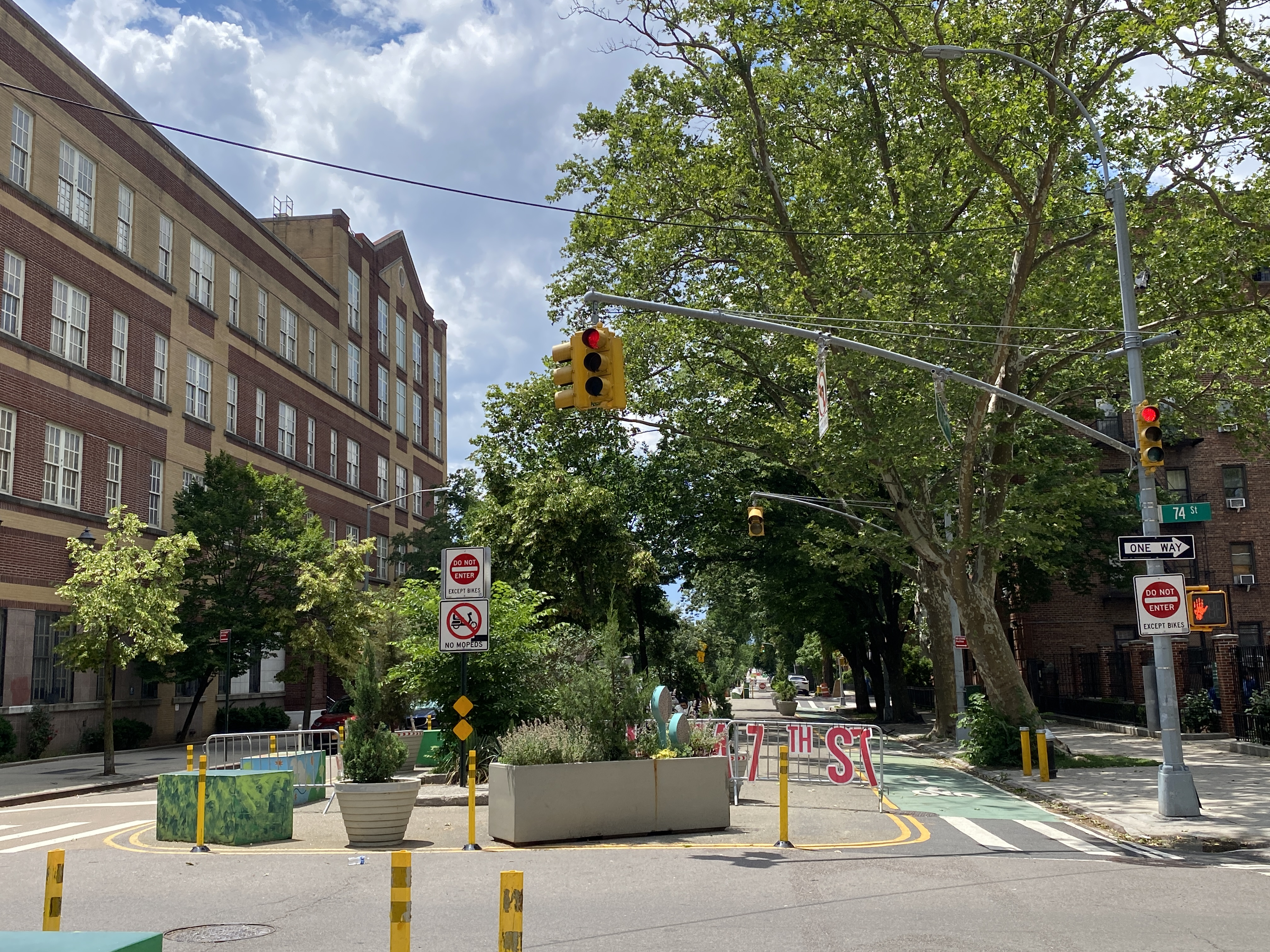
34th Avenue Open Streets, June 2026

Since May 2020, a 1.3-mile (2.1 km) stretch of 34^{th} Avenue, much of which runs through Jackson Heights, is closed to vehicular traffic from 7am to 8pm, providing a space for the community to gather. This area is also known as Paseo Park, and was officially renamed as such in 2023 when the New York City Council passed a bill introduced by local Councilmember Krishnan. By 2025, there were proposals to permanently convert 26 blocks of 34^{th} Avenue into parkland, with a new Paseo Park designed by WXY.

== Police and crime ==
Jackson Heights is patrolled by the 115th Precinct of the NYPD, at 92–15 Northern Boulevard. The 115th Precinct was ranked 20th safest out of 69 patrol areas for per-capita crime in 2010. Crime has declined significantly since the late 20th century, when the area was known as the "cocaine capital" of New York City. As of 2018, with a non-fatal assault rate of 33 per 100,000 people, Jackson Heights's rate of violent crimes per capita is less than that of the city as a whole. The incarceration rate of 342 per 100,000 people is lower than that of the city as a whole.

The 115th Precinct has a lower crime rate than in the 1990s, with crimes across all categories decreasing by 85% between 1990 and 2019. The precinct reported 11 murders, 42 rapes, 246 robberies, 344 felony assaults, 125 burglaries, 520 grand larcenies, and 128 grand larcenies auto in 2019.

== Fire safety ==
Jackson Heights is served by two New York City Fire Department (FDNY) fire stations. Engine Co. 307/Ladder Co. 154 is at 81–19 Northern Boulevard. Another fire station, Engine Co. 316, is at 27–12 Kearney Street in East Elmhurst.

== Health ==
As of 2018, preterm births are about the same in Jackson Heights as in other places citywide, but births to teenage mothers are more common. In Jackson Heights, there were 86 preterm births per 1,000 live births (compared to 87 per 1,000 citywide), and 27.9 births to teenage mothers per 1,000 live births (compared to 19.3 per 1,000 citywide). Jackson Heights has a high population of residents who are uninsured. In 2018, this population of uninsured residents was estimated to be 28%, which is higher than the citywide rate of 12%.

The concentration of fine particulate matter, the deadliest type of air pollutant, in Jackson Heights is 0.0073 milligrams per cubic metre (7.3×10^{−9} oz/ft^{3}), lower than the city average. Thirteen percent of Jackson Heights residents are smokers, which is slightly lower than the city average of 14% of residents being smokers. In Jackson Heights, 20% of residents are obese, 13% are diabetic, and 29% have high blood pressure—compared to the citywide averages of 20%, 14%, and 24% respectively. In addition, 26% of children are obese, compared to the citywide average of 20%.

Eighty-six percent of residents eat some fruits and vegetables every day, which is slightly lower than the city's average of 87%. In 2018, 72% of residents described their health as "good", "very good", or "excellent", lower than the city's average of 78%. For every supermarket in Jackson Heights, there are 17 bodegas. Jackson Heights also has two farmer's markets.

The nearest large hospital in the Jackson Heights area is the Elmhurst Hospital Center in Elmhurst.

=== Incidents ===
In 2020, the neighborhoods of Corona, East Elmhurst, Elmhurst, and Jackson Heights were most affected by the COVID-19 pandemic in New York City. As of August 10, these communities, with a cumulative 303,494 residents, had recorded 12,954 COVID-19 cases and 1,178 deaths. COVID-19 cases in ZIP Code 11372 were among the highest of any ZIP Code in New York City.

== Post offices and ZIP Codes ==
Jackson Heights is covered by multiple ZIP Codes. The area between Northern Boulevard and Roosevelt Avenue is covered by 11372, while the areas north of Northern Boulevard, which are considered primarily part of East Elmhurst, are covered by 11370 west of 85th Street (an area stretching north to Astoria and Rikers Island) and 11369 east of 85th Street. ZIP Code 11371 is assigned to LaGuardia Airport.

The United States Post Office operates three locations in Jackson Heights:

- Jackson Heights Station – 78-02 37th Avenue
- Junction Boulevard Station – 33-23 Junction Boulevard
- Trainsmeadow Station – 75–77 31st Avenue

== Education ==
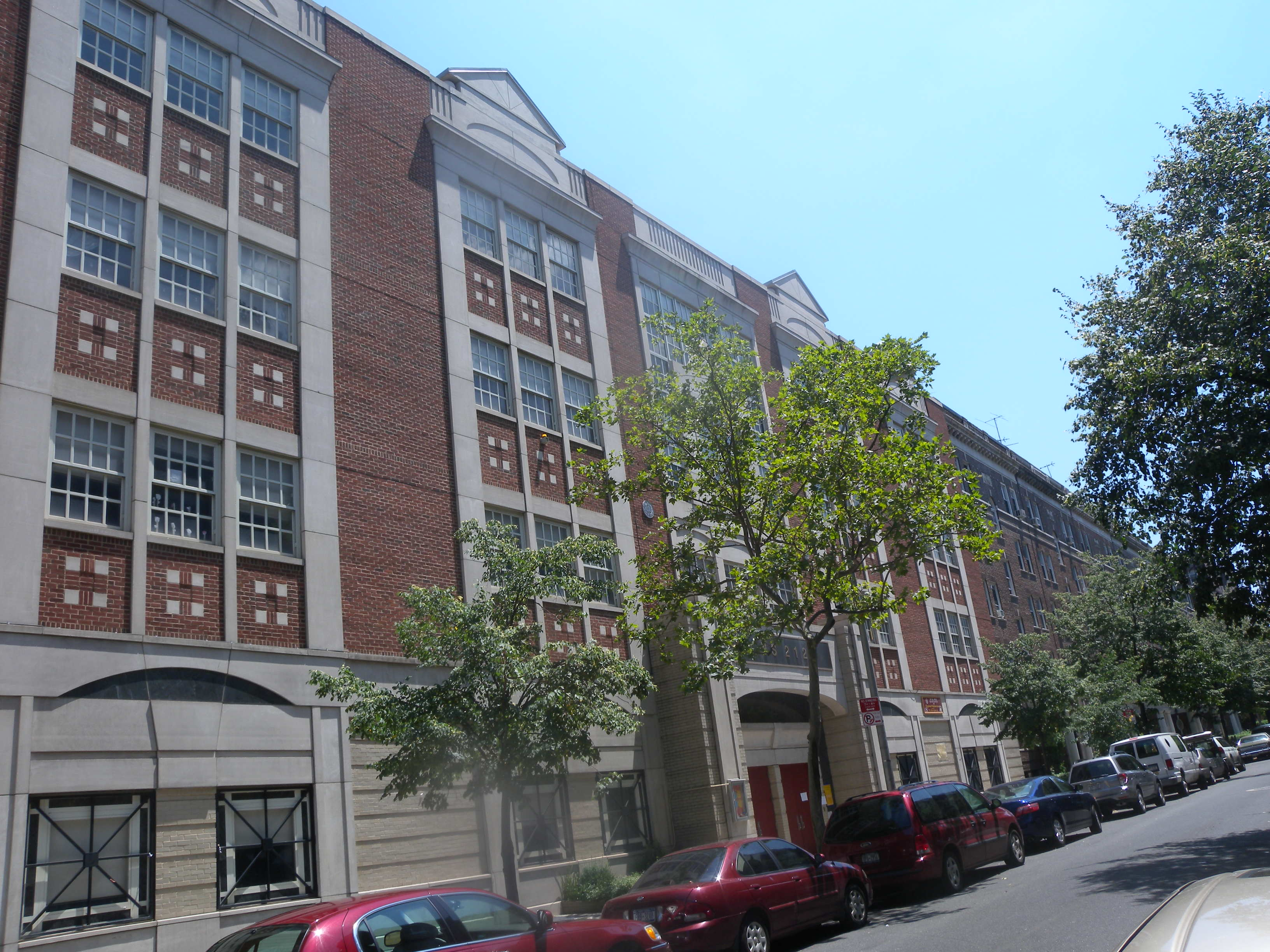
PS 212

Jackson Heights generally has a lower proportion of college-educated residents than the rest of the city as of 2018. While 27% of residents age 25 and older have a college education or higher, 30% have less than a high school education and 47% are high school graduates or have some college education. By contrast, 39% of Queens residents and 43% of city residents have a college education or higher. The percentage of Jackson Heights students excelling in math rose from 41% in 2000 to 65% in 2011, and reading achievement rose from 46% to 49% during the same time period.

Jackson Heights's rate of elementary school student absenteeism is less than the rest of New York City. In Jackson Heights, 12% of elementary school students missed 20 or more days per school year, lower than the citywide average of 20%. Additionally, 78% of high school students in Jackson Heights graduate on time, more than the citywide average of 75%.

=== Schools ===
The New York City Department of Education operates public schools. Schools in Jackson Heights include P.S. 69 Jackson Heights School, P.S. 149 Christa McAuliffe School, P.S. 212, P.S 222 FF Christopher A. Santora School, I.S. 145 Joseph Pulitzer School, P.S. 152, and I.S. 230.

Charter schools include the Pre-K–12 school Renaissance Charter School.

Private schools in the neighborhood include Saint Joan of Arc School (Pre-K3 to 8th grade), Our Lady of Fatima School (Pre-K to 8th grade), and Monsignor McClancy Memorial High School, a school in East Elmhurst that became co-ed after the 2012 school year. Garden School, a private, nonprofit 501(c)(3) independent school in Jackson Heights, enrolls 300 students from grades Nursery–Grade 12.

82nd Street Academics, a nonprofit 501(c)(3) educational institution, is housed at the Community United Methodist Church of Jackson Heights. Since 2003, it has been a community-based Universal Pre-Kindergarten provider under contract with the New York City Department of Education.

=== Library ===
The Queens Public Library's Jackson Heights branch is at 35–51 81st Street.

== Houses of worship ==
The community is home to various houses of worship from a wide array of religions.

The Community United Methodist Church, between 81st and 82nd streets on 35th Avenue, is the oldest church in Jackson Heights. Founded in 1919, it was dedicated in 1923 as part of Queensboro Corporation's planned development. Originally serving the spiritual needs of European-American Protestant residents, it is now the most diverse church in Queens with Chinese, Korean, Spanish, and English services. Reverend Austin Armistead, who led the church from 1974 to 1995, is credited for the church's racial and cultural change. Prior to his arrival in 1974, the suggestion of the Spanish-speaking service had been rejected. Armistead made the decision to remake the church, with a vision of mirroring the neighborhood and so divided the church into four different ministries; the church also came to serve as "common ground" for a range of community groups, from ethnic associations to LGBTQ organizations to nonprofits like the Jackson Heights Beautification Group.

Satya Narayan Mandir, at the corner of 76 street and Woodside Avenue, is the oldest Hindu-Sikhism combination temple in the United States (and, it claims, the Americas). It was incorporated in 1987.

Saint Joan of Arc Catholic Church, between 82nd and 83rd Street on 35th Avenue, was the first Catholic church to be named in honor of a newly canonized French Saint.

Muhammadi Community Center, at 37–46 72nd Street, has served Jackson Heights's Muslims since 1995. Its head and founder is Imam Qazi Qayyoom.

St. Mark's Episcopal Church, on 34th Avenue between 81st and 82nd streets within the Jackson Heights Historic District, offers bilingual worship. It was established in 1923 as part of Queensboro Corporation's planned development. In 1993, it was designated by the New York City Landmarks Preservation Commission.

Jackson Heights-Elmhurst Kehillah, on the lower level of the Jackson Heights Jewish Center at 77th Street and 37th Avenue, provides all manner of services for all residents of Jackson Heights, Elmhurst, and western Queens.

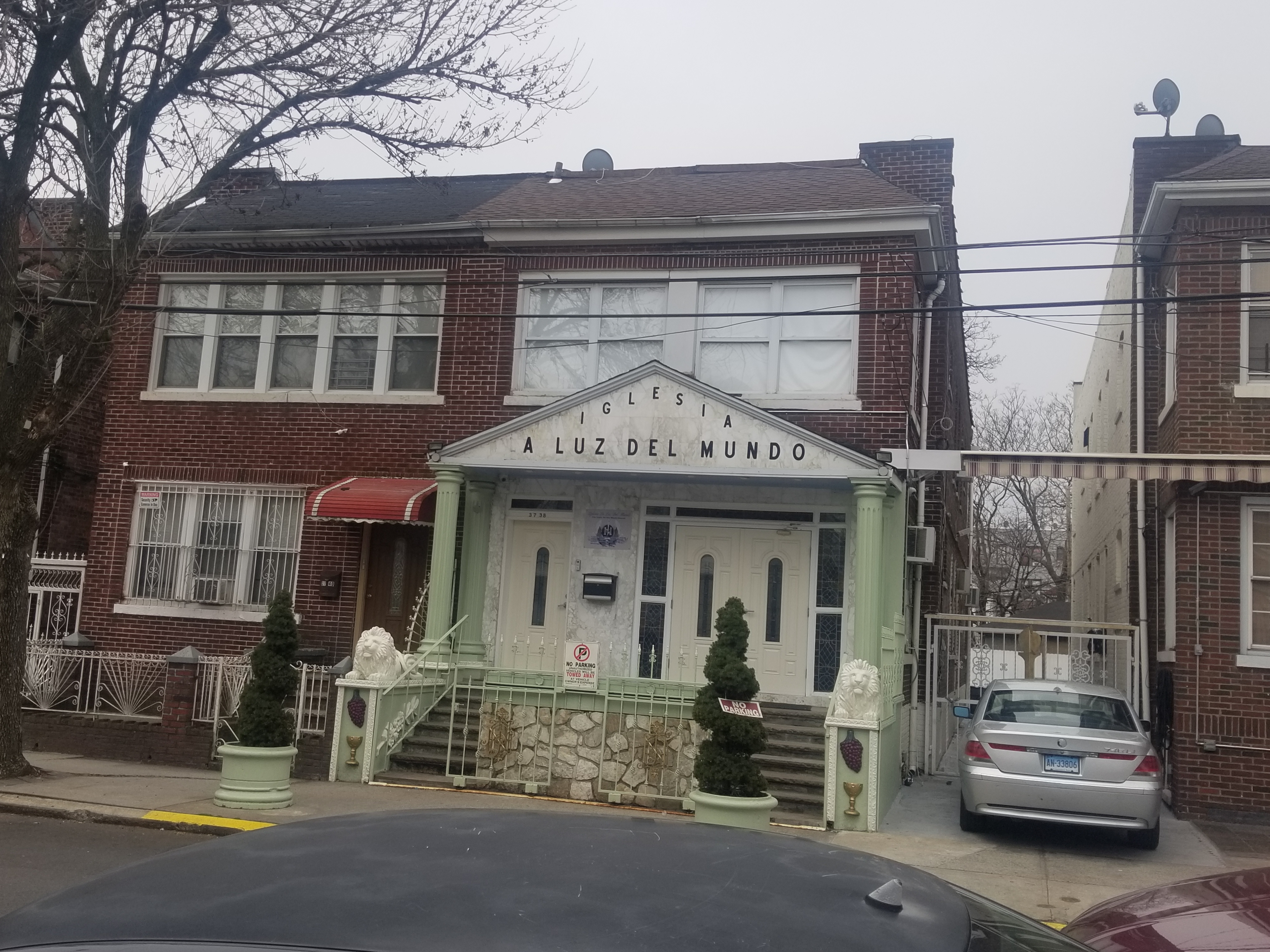
Iglesia La Luz Del Mundo

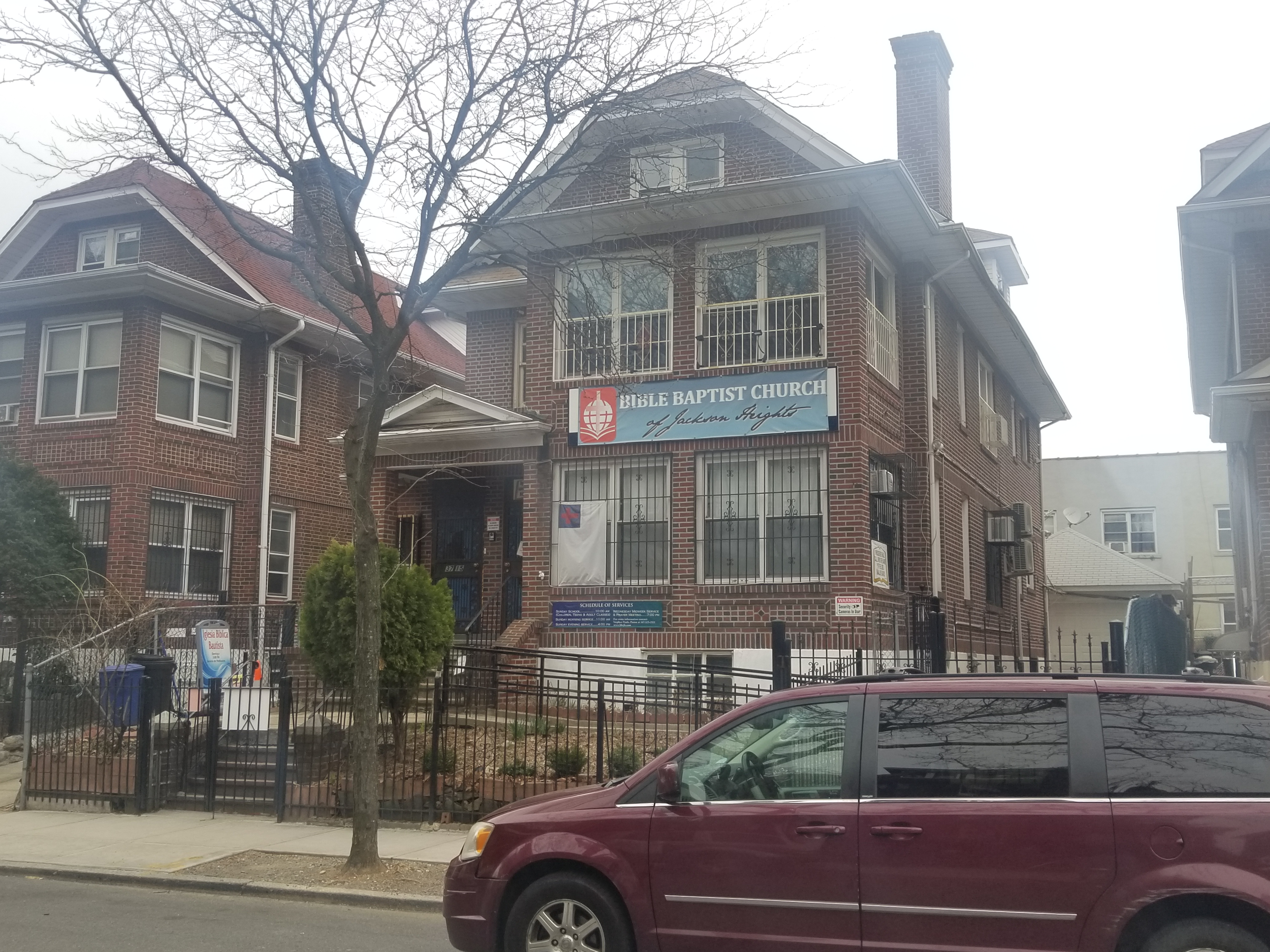
Bible Baptist church of Jackson Heights

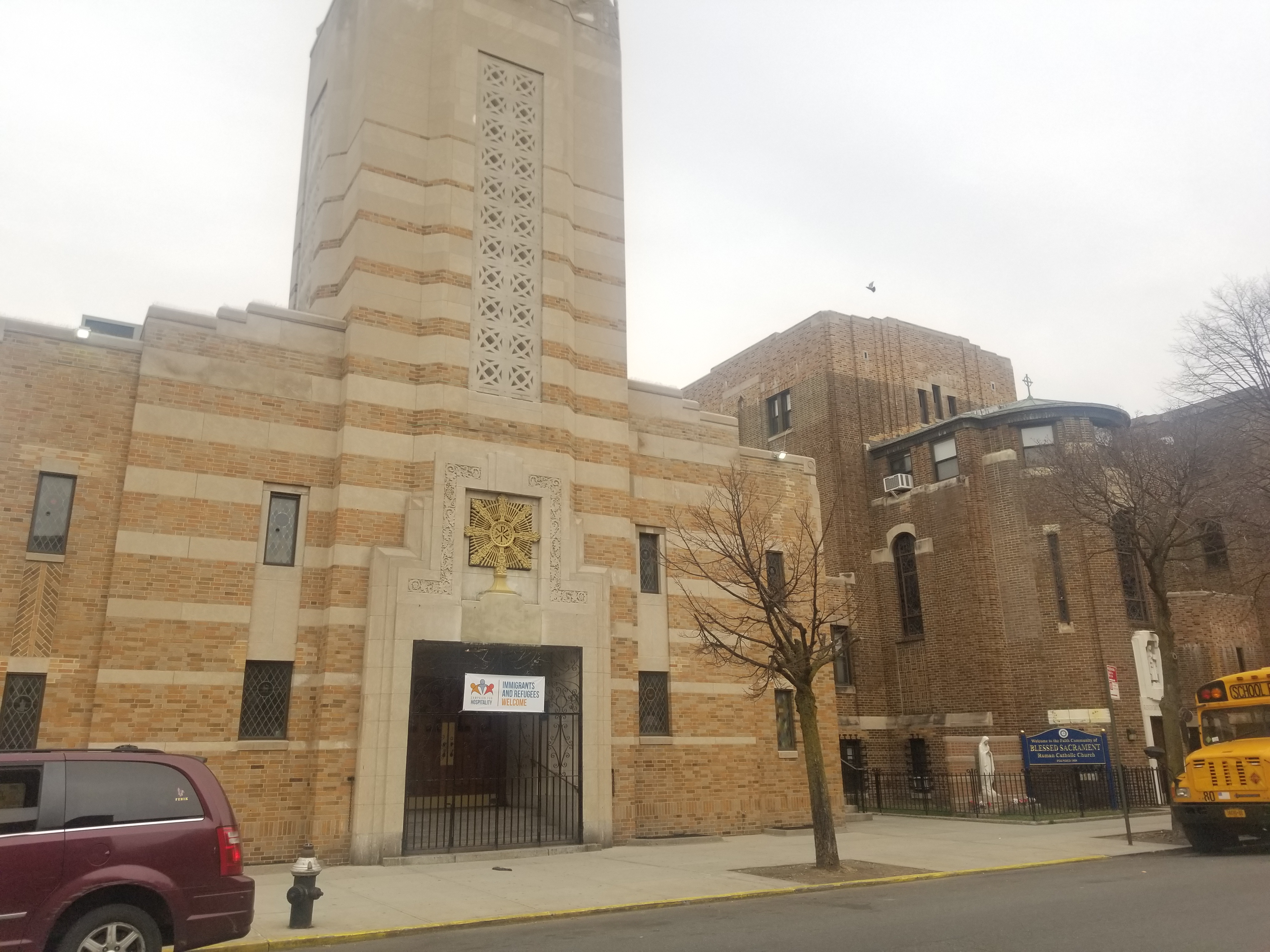
Blessed Sacrament Church

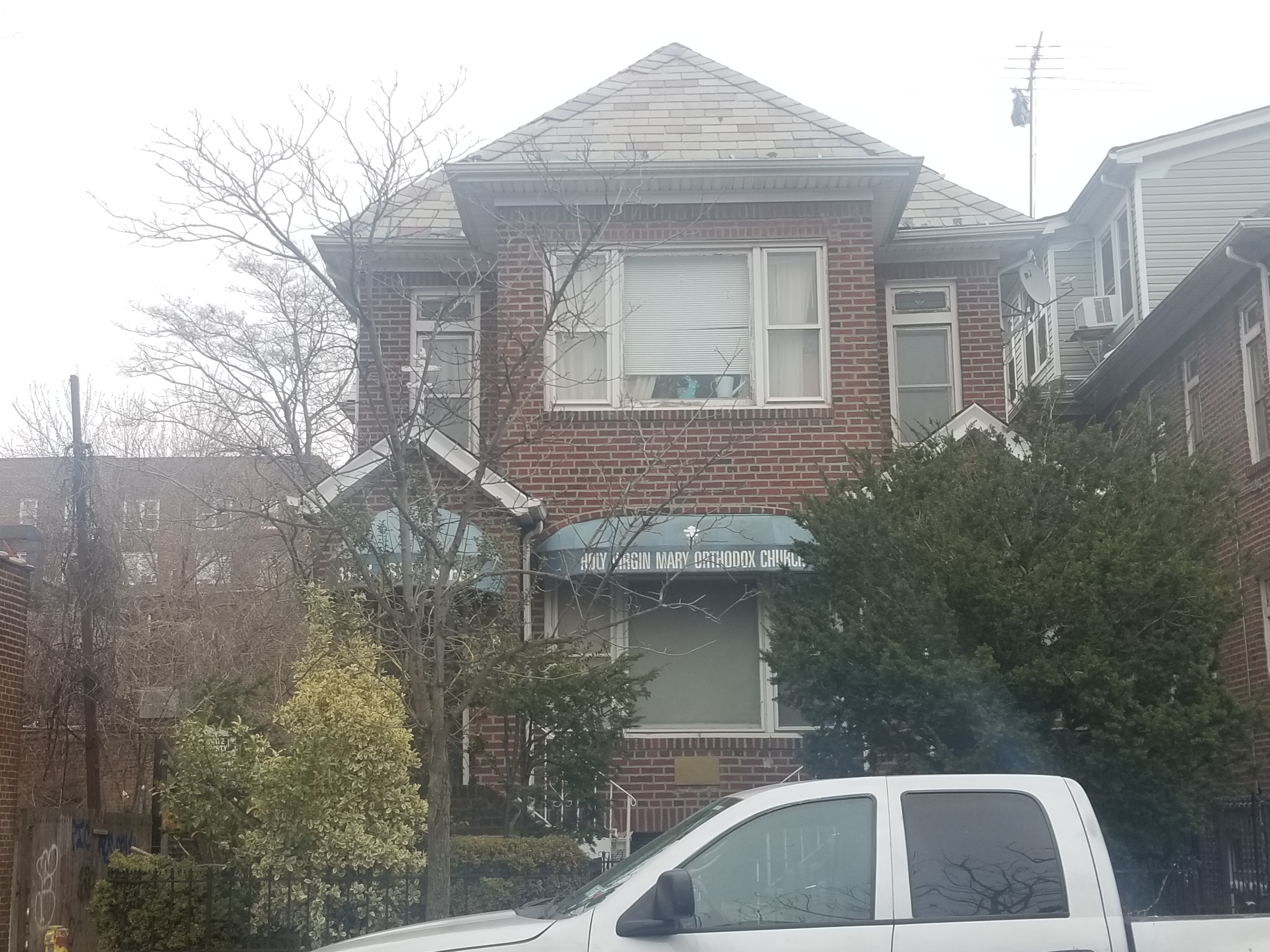
Orthodox American Church

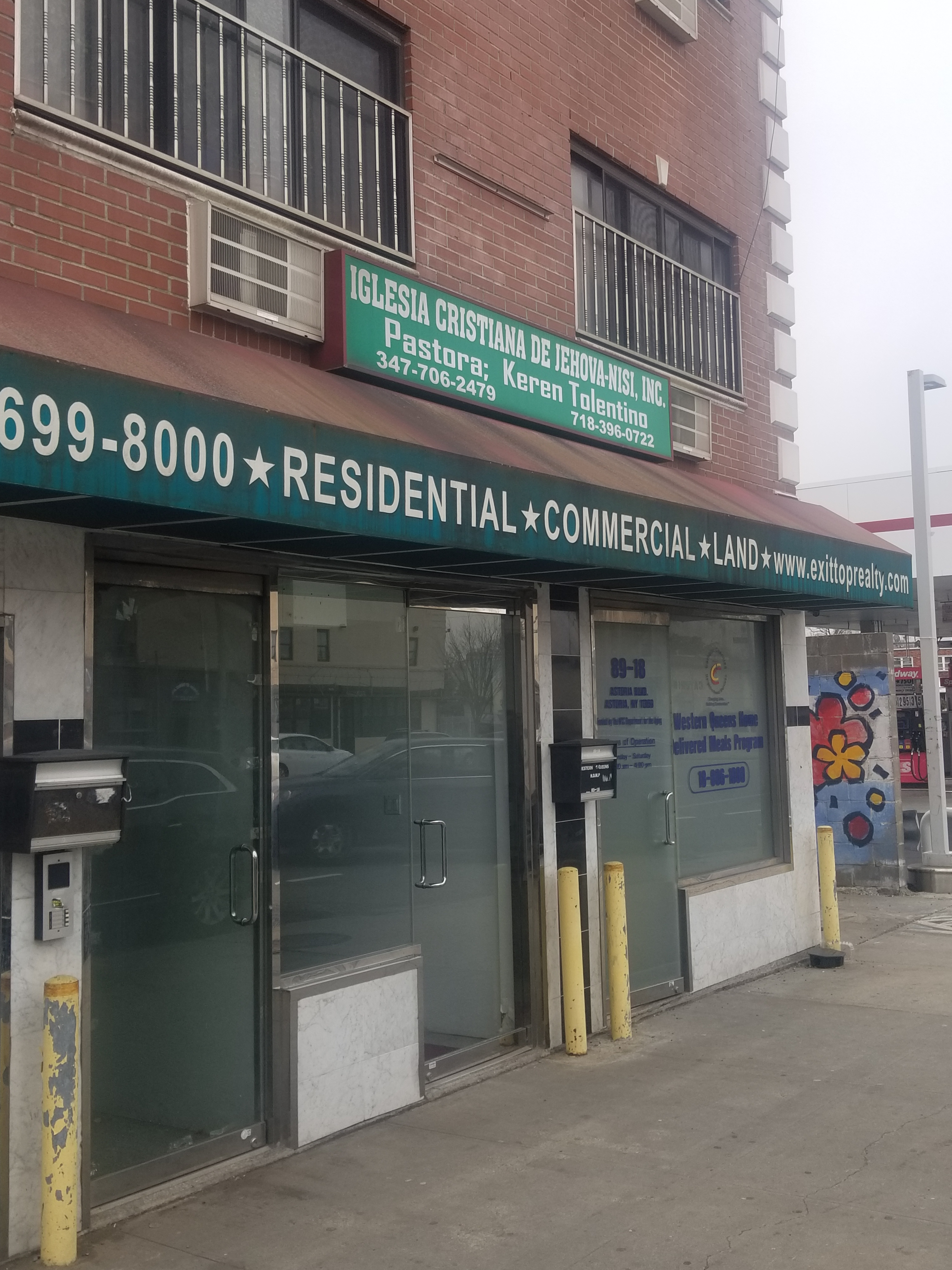
Iglesia Cristiana De Restauracion Jehova Nisi

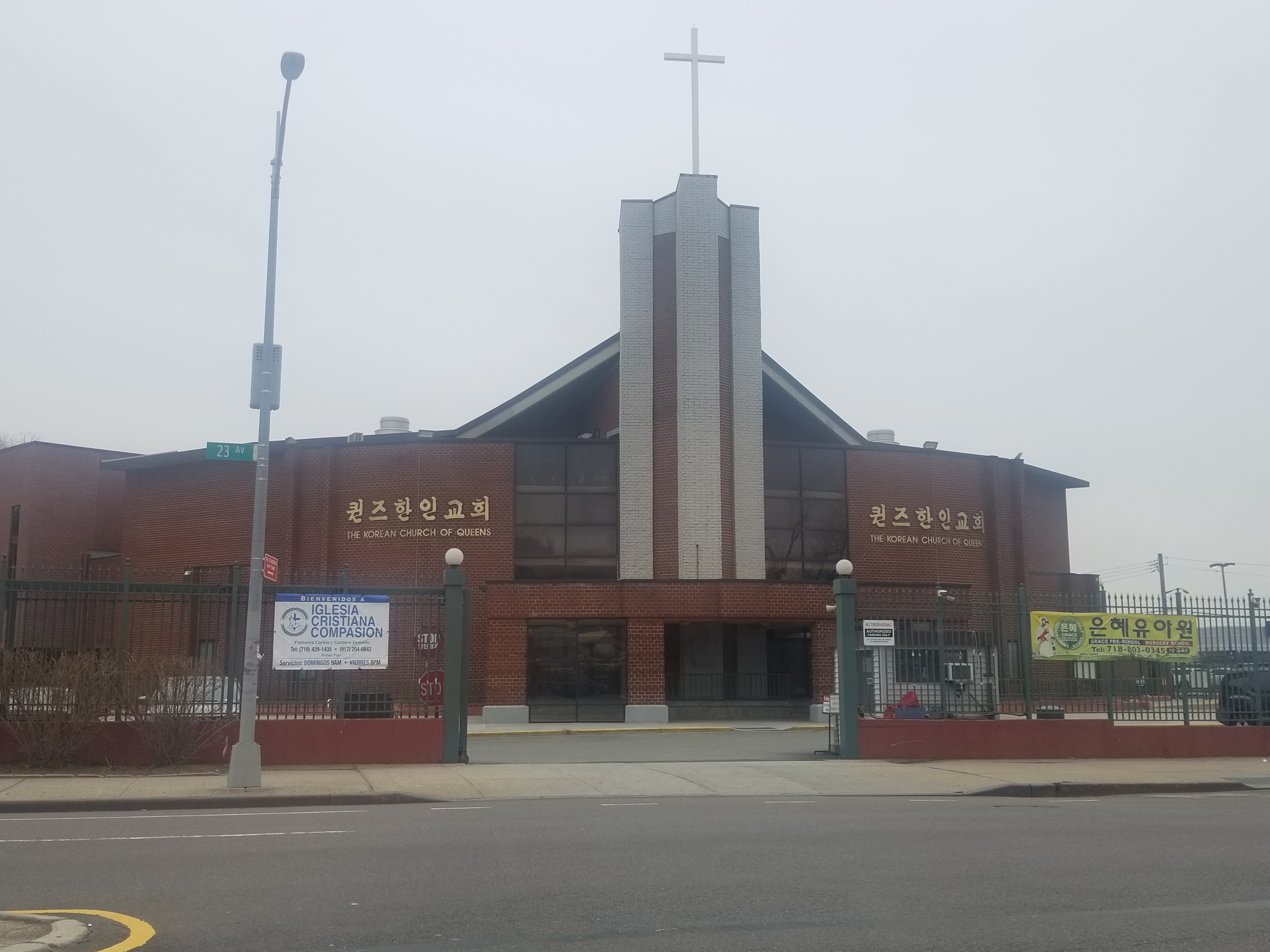
The Korean Church Of Queens

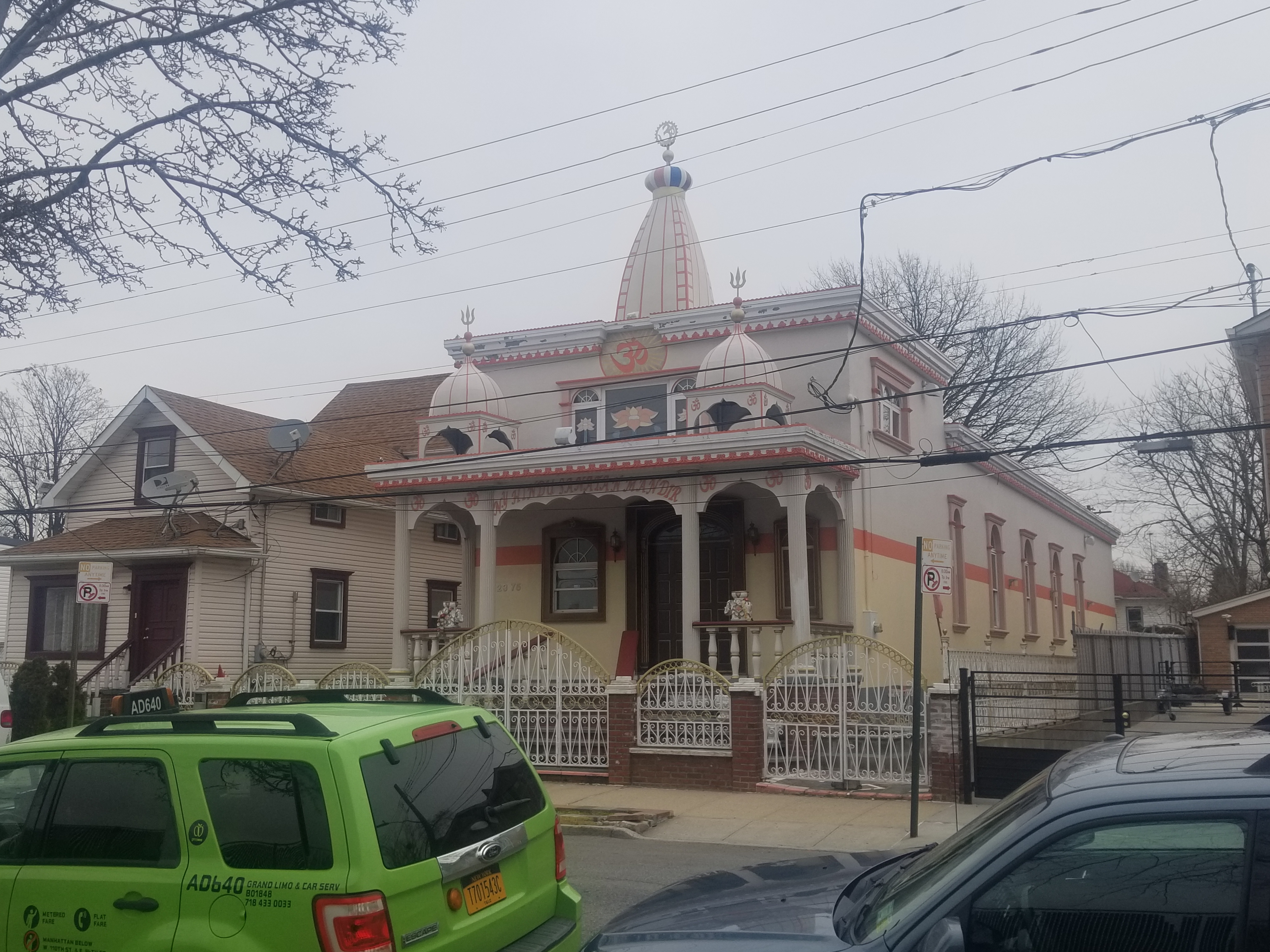
New York Hindu Sanatan Inc

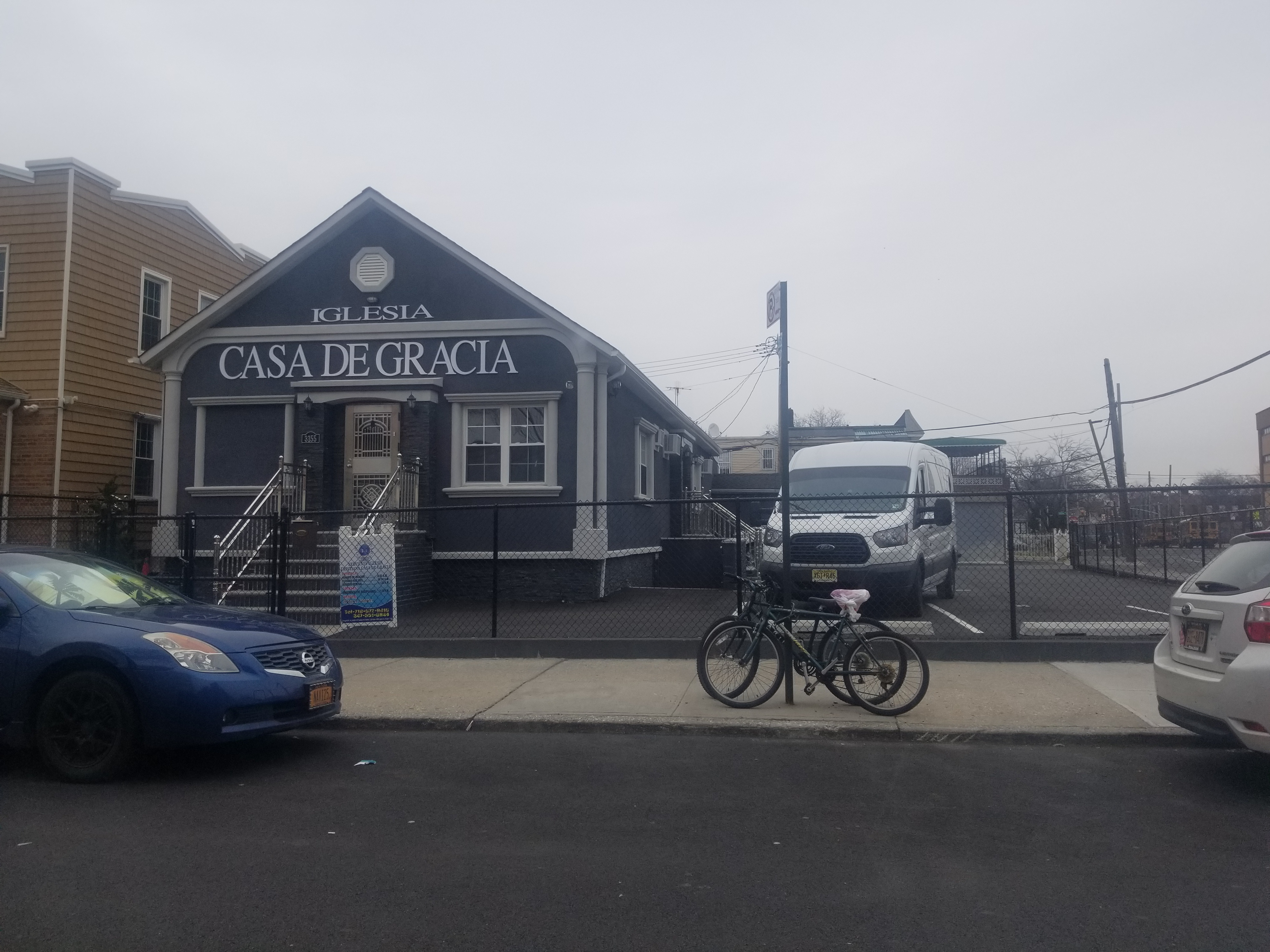
Grace Community Church

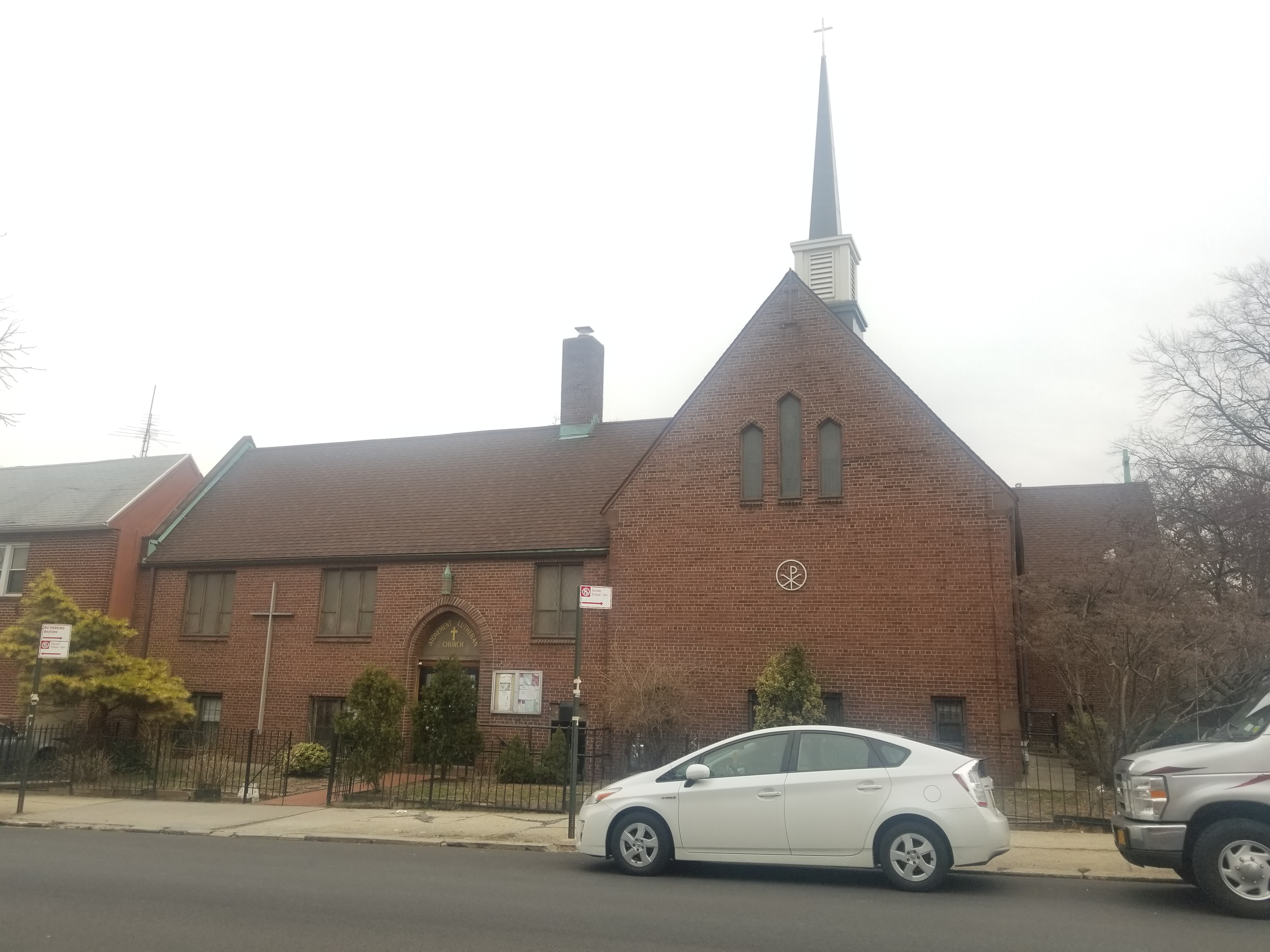
Atonement Lutheran Church & Pre School

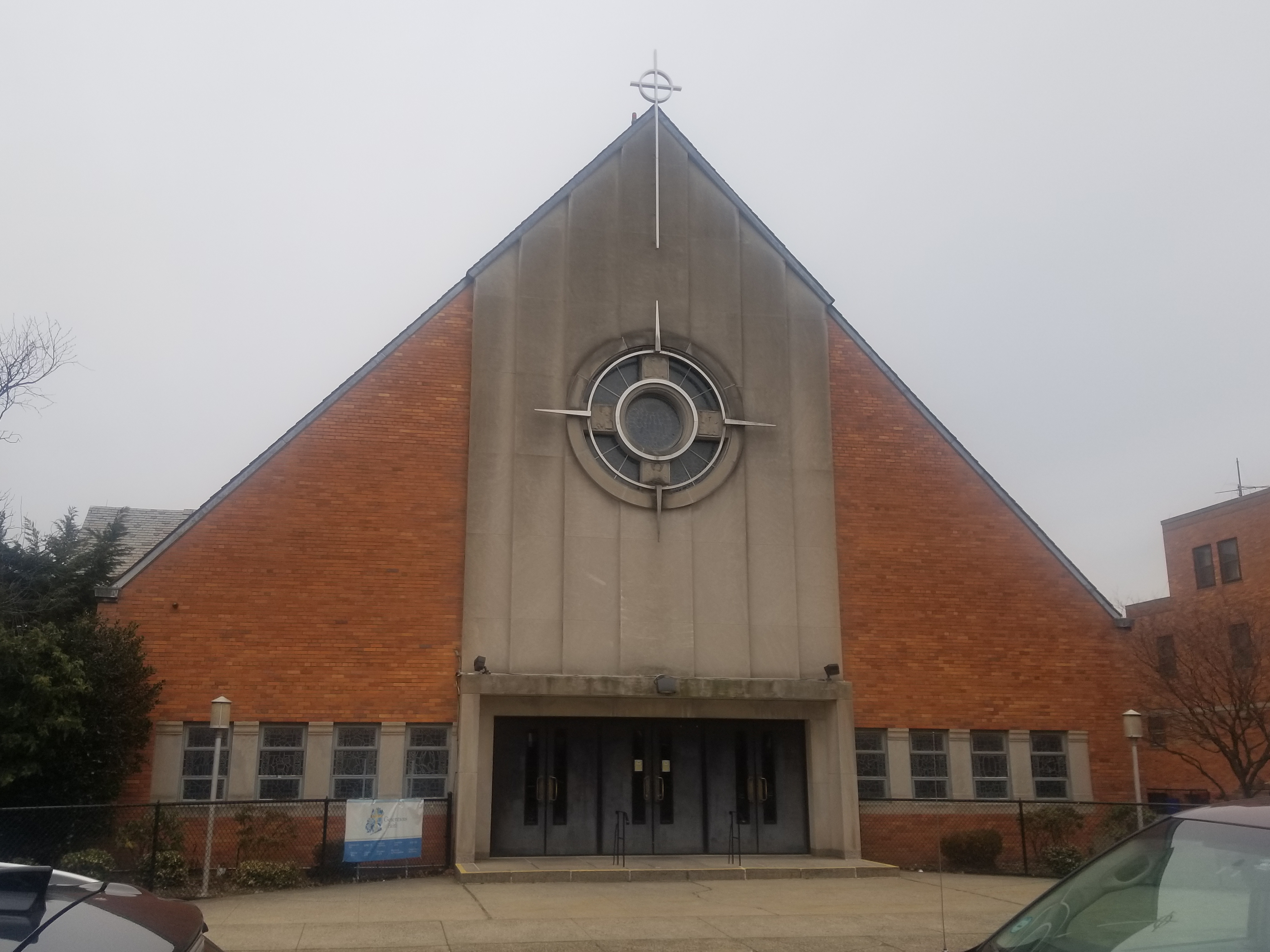
Our Lady of Fatima Church (East Elmhurst)

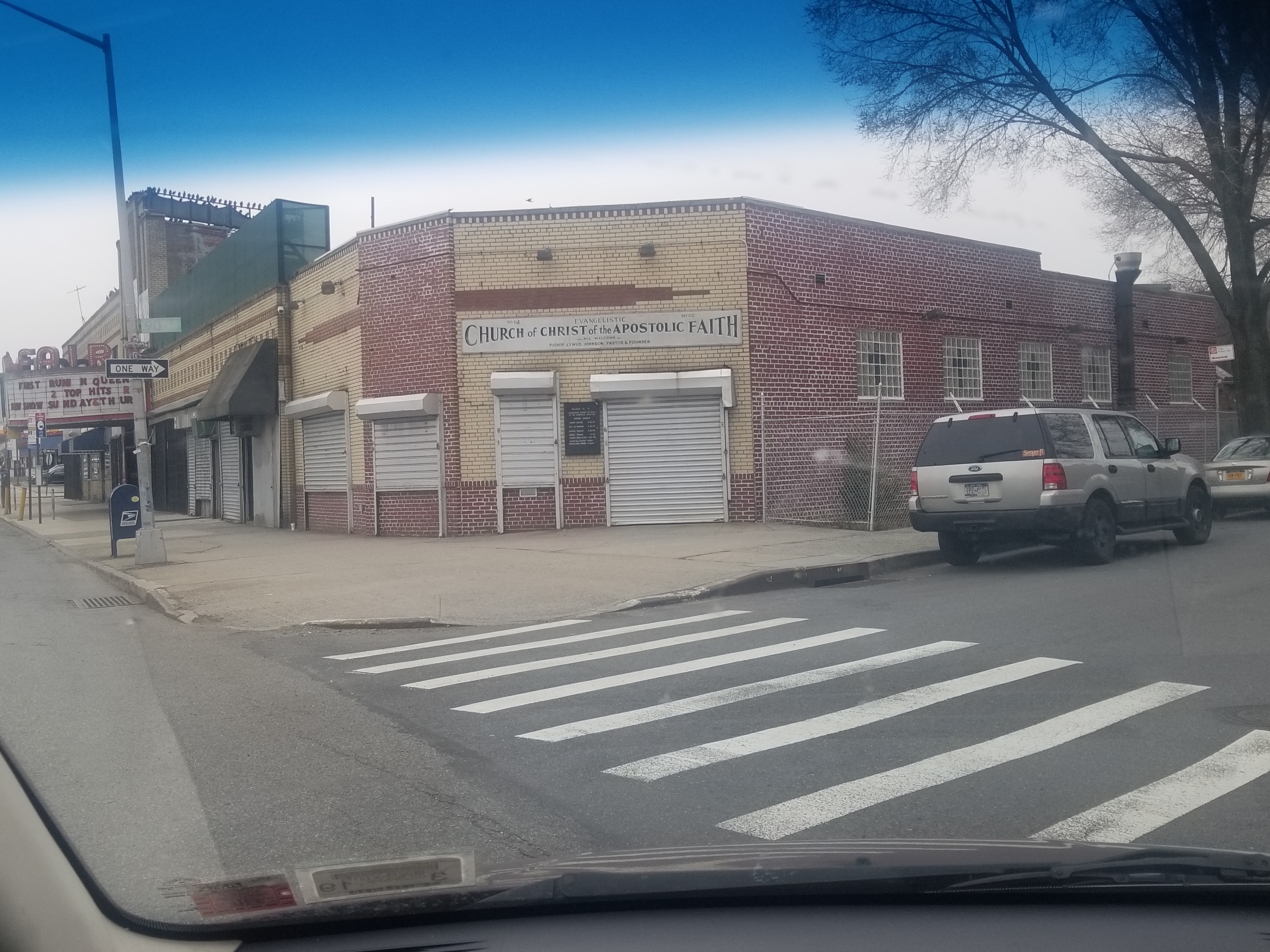
Evangelistic Church - Our Lord

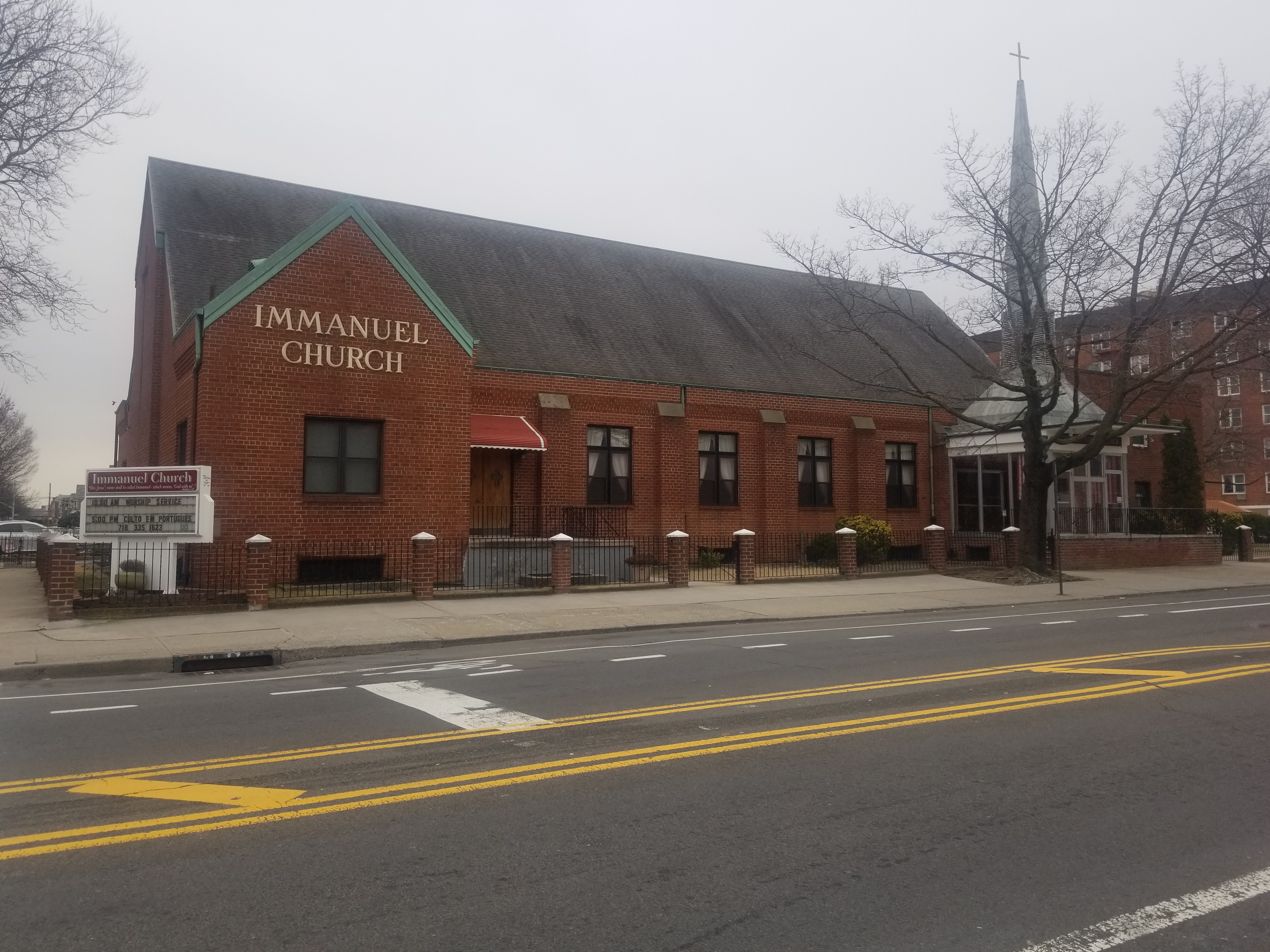
Immanuel Baptist

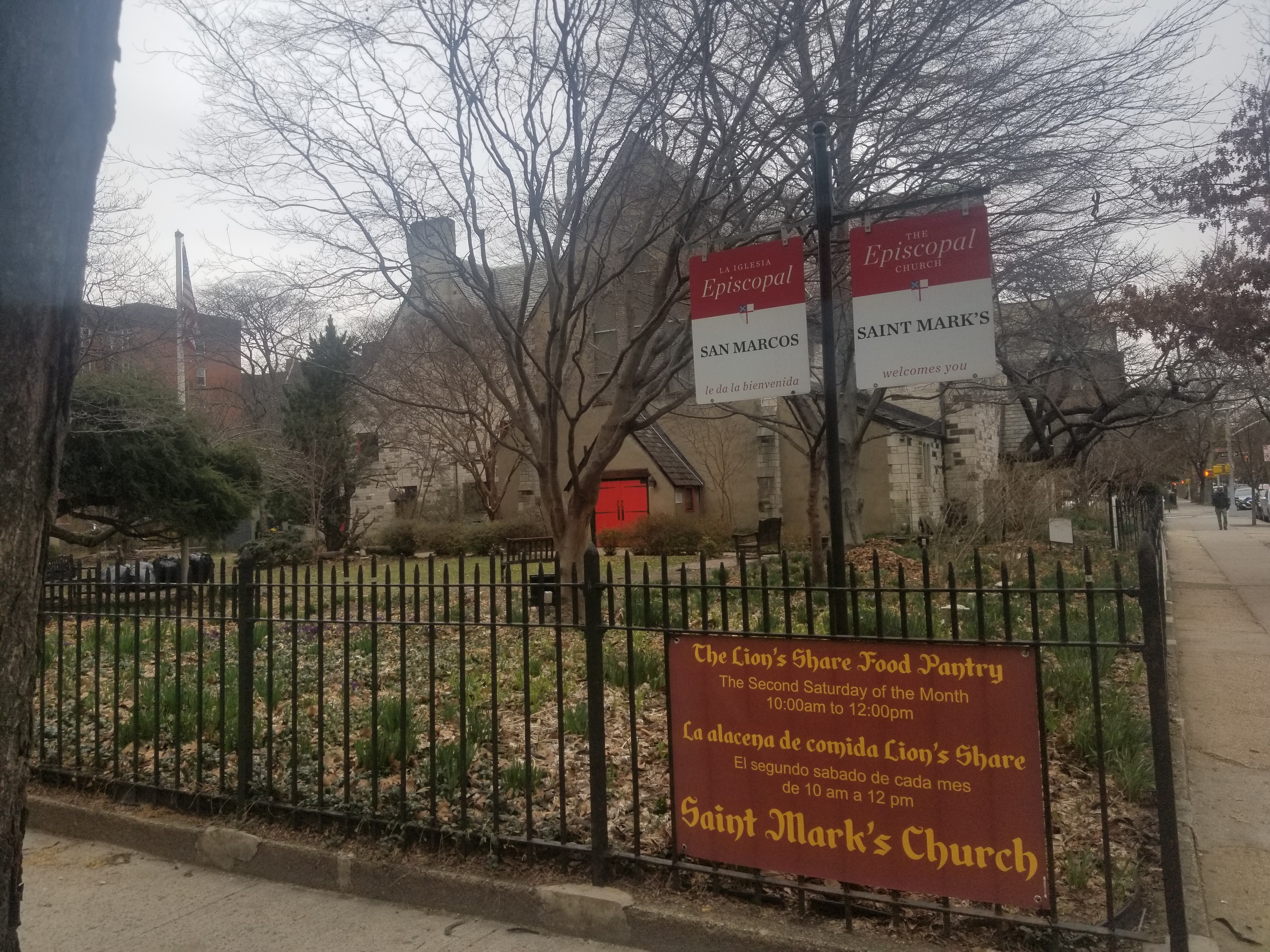
Saint Mark's Episcopal Church

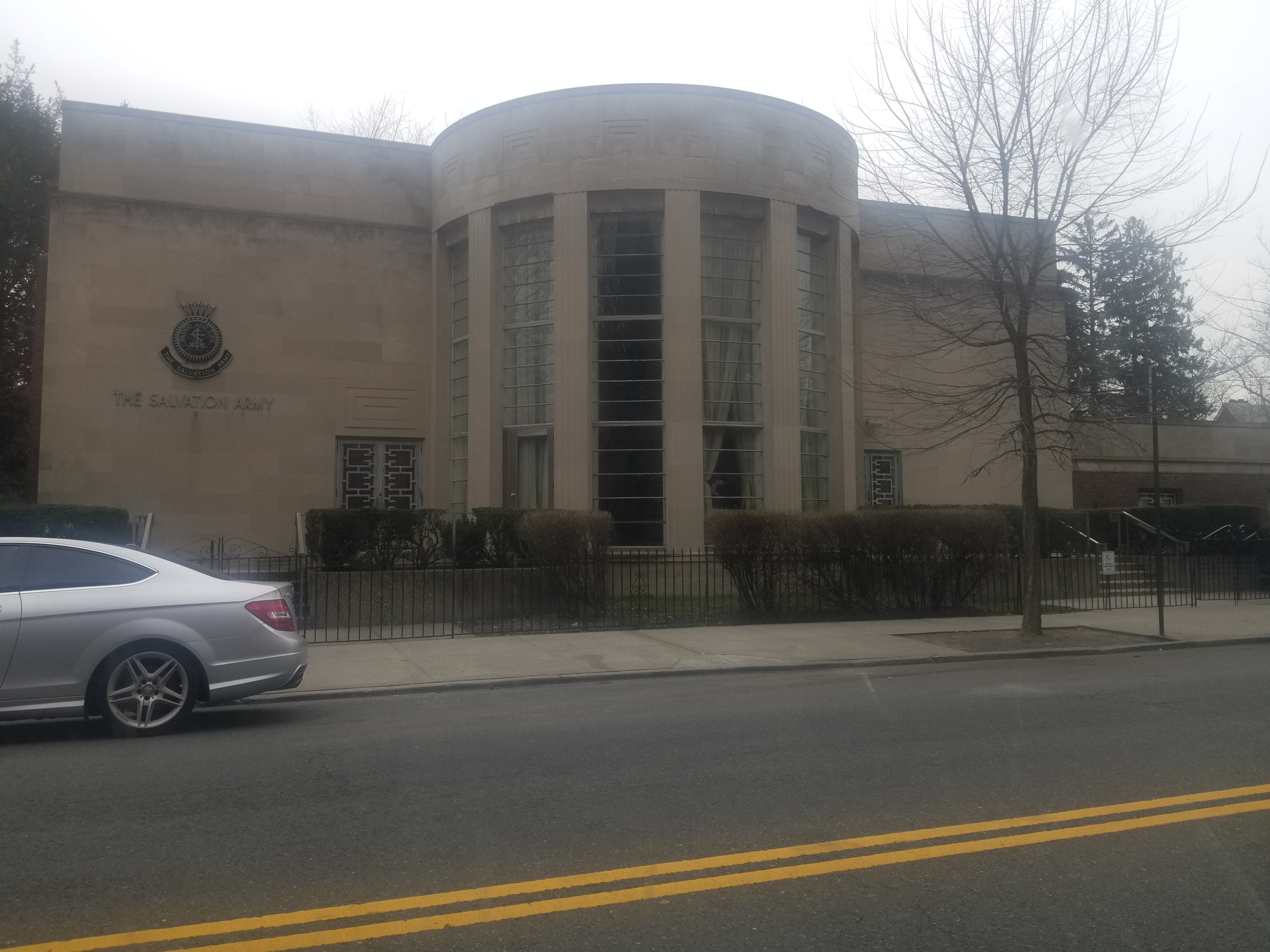
The Salvation Army Queens Temple Corps. Community Center

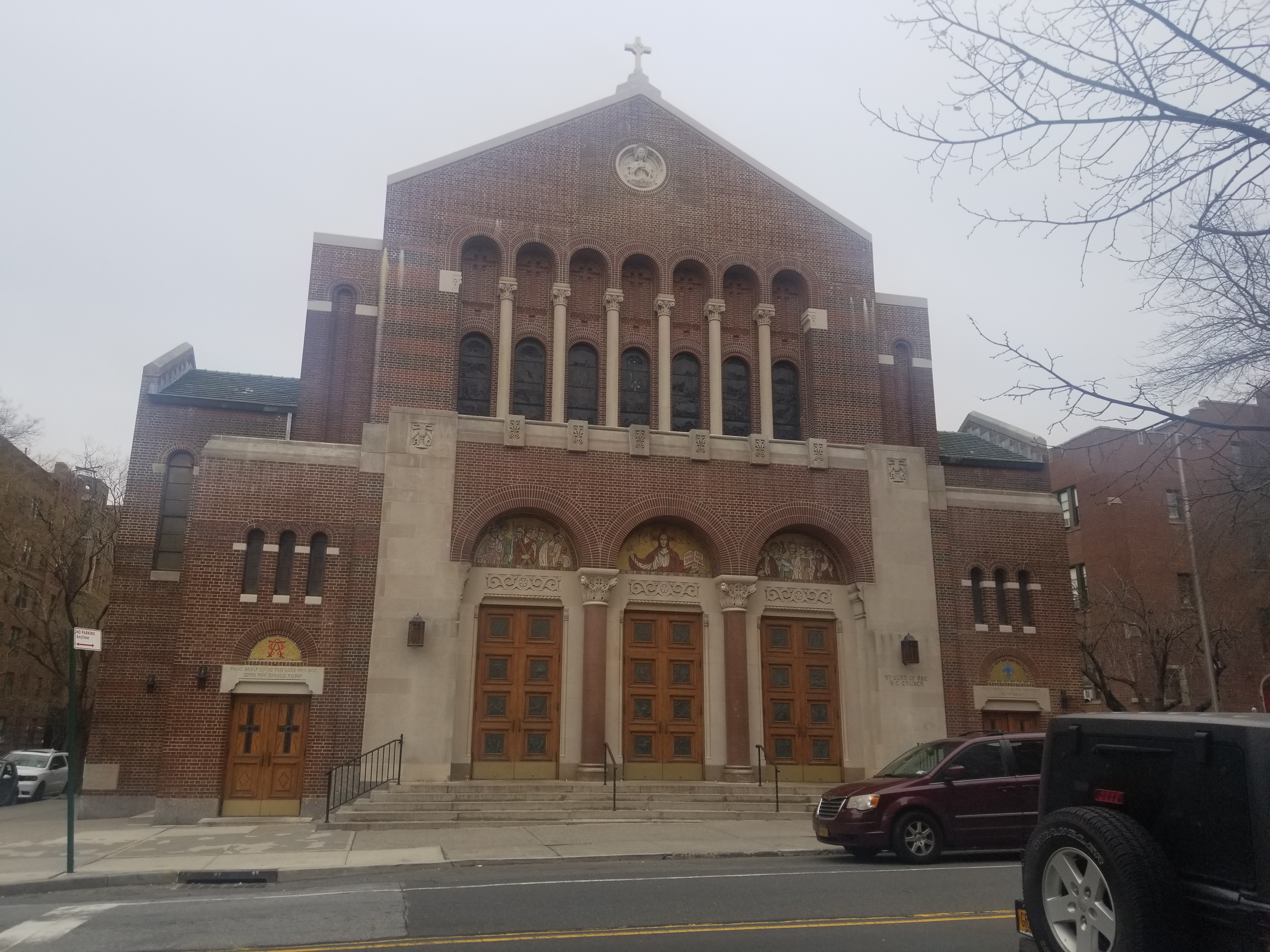
St Joan Of Arc Rc

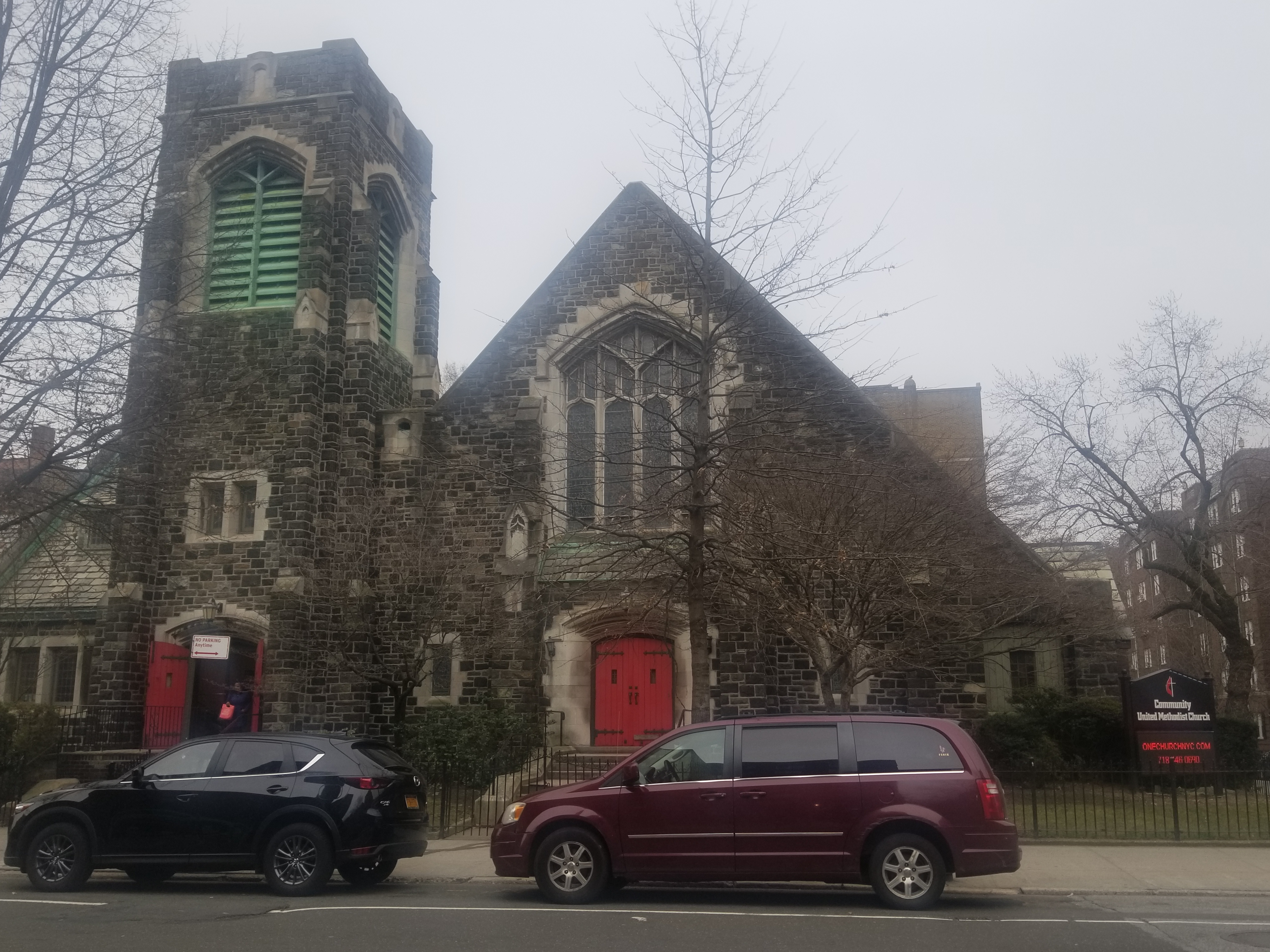
Community United Methodist

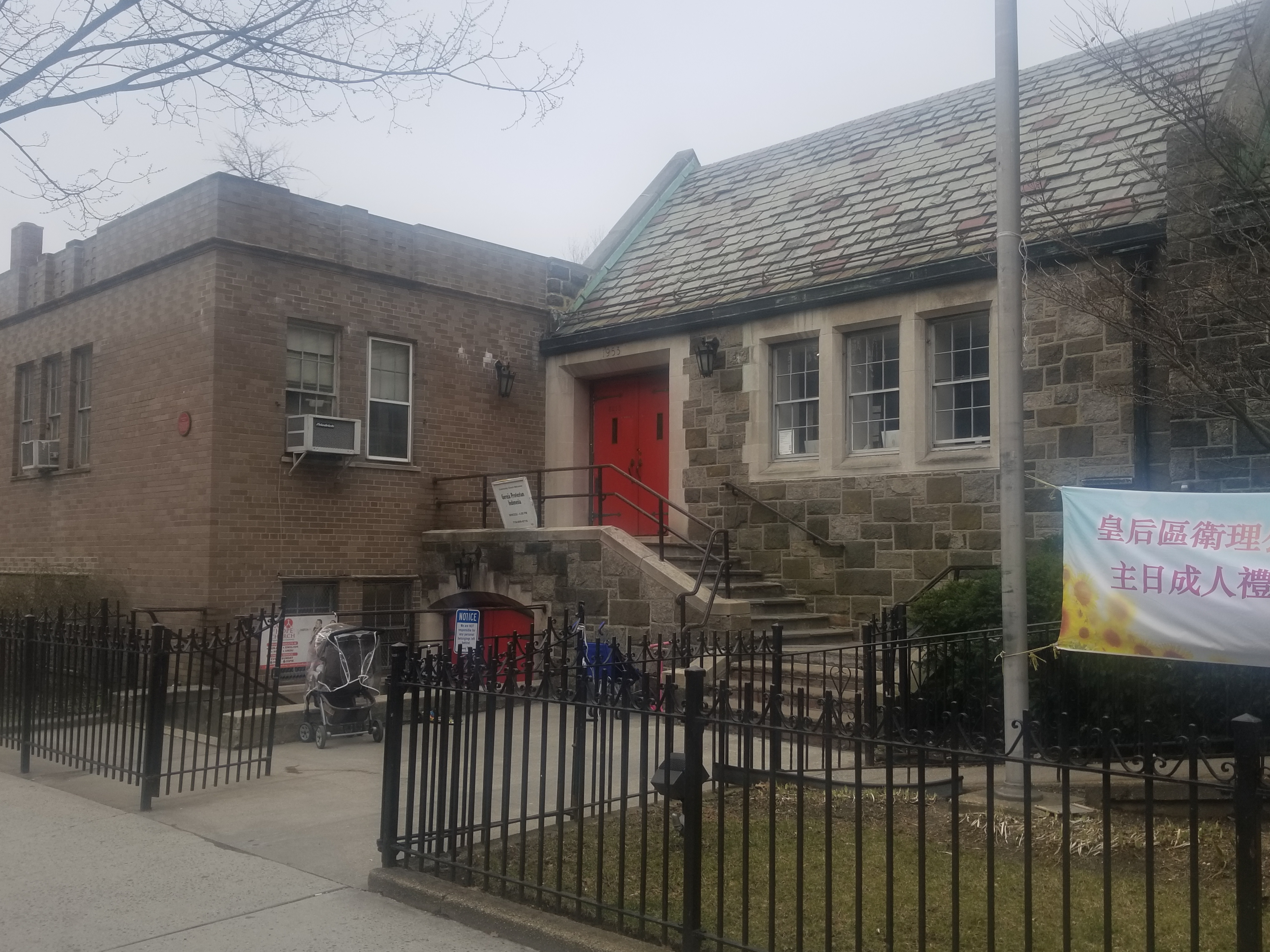
Ray Of Hope Church

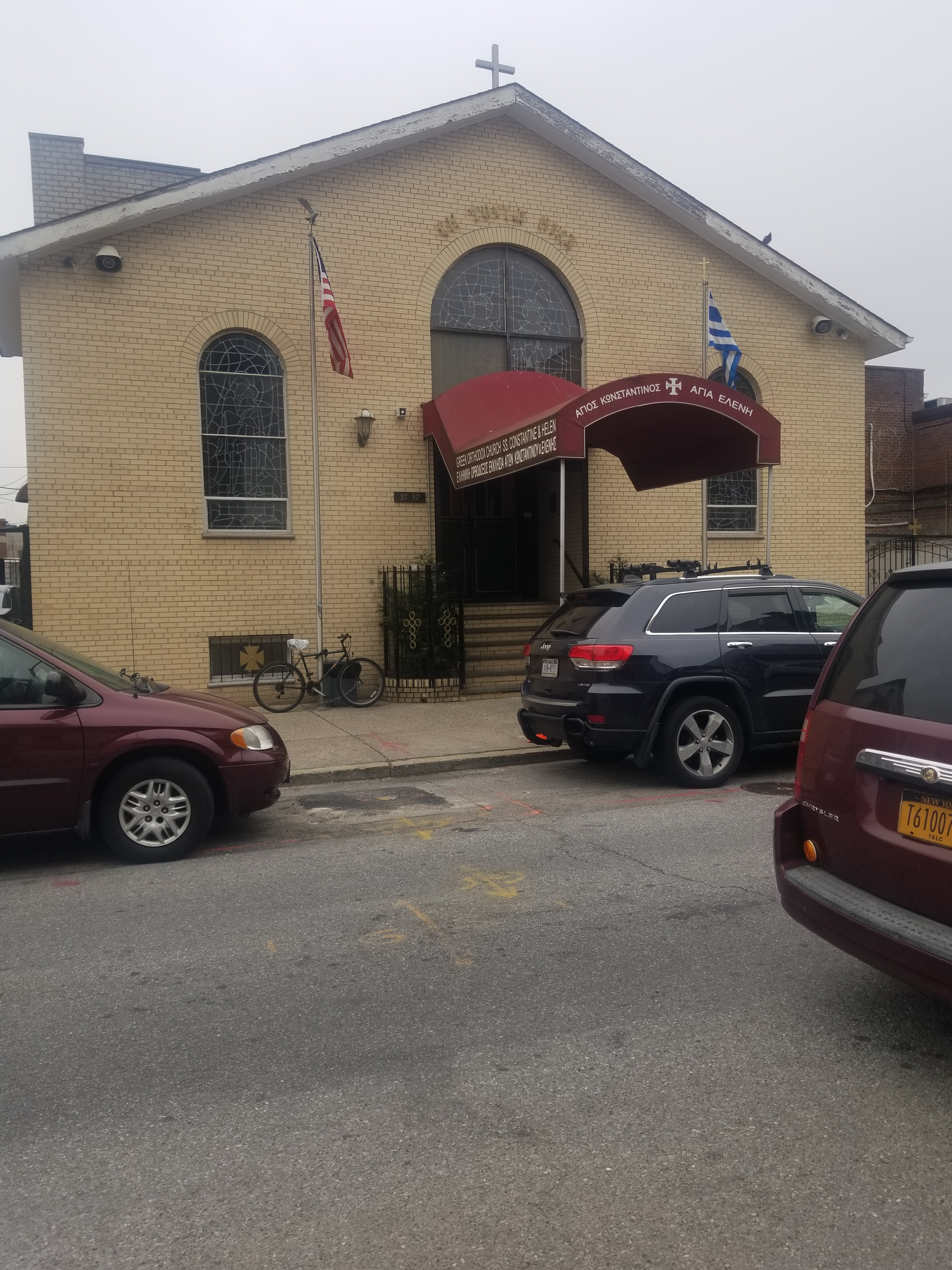
Saint Constantine & Helen Greek Orthodox Church

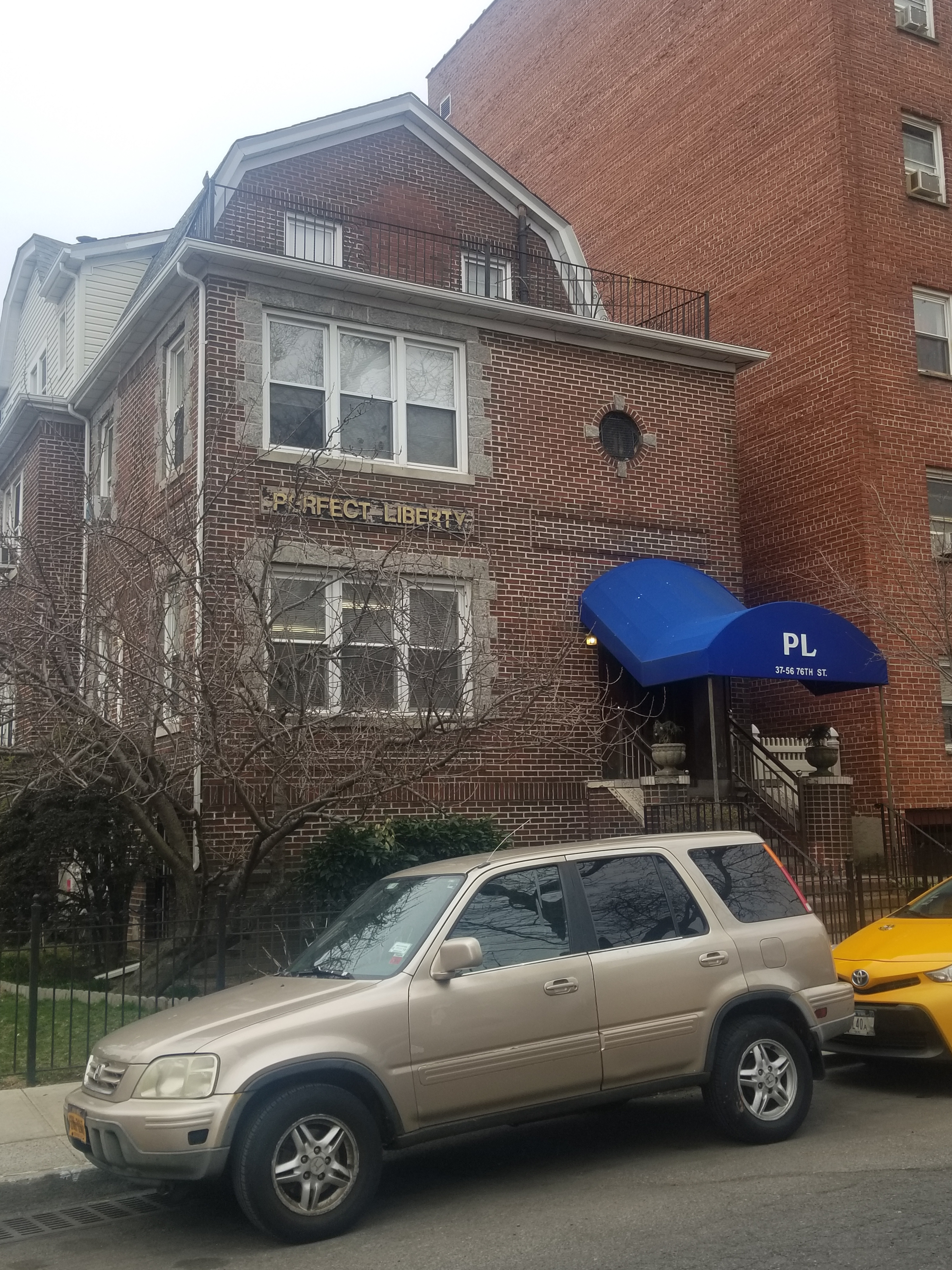
Perfect Liberty Church

== Transportation ==
=== Public transportation ===
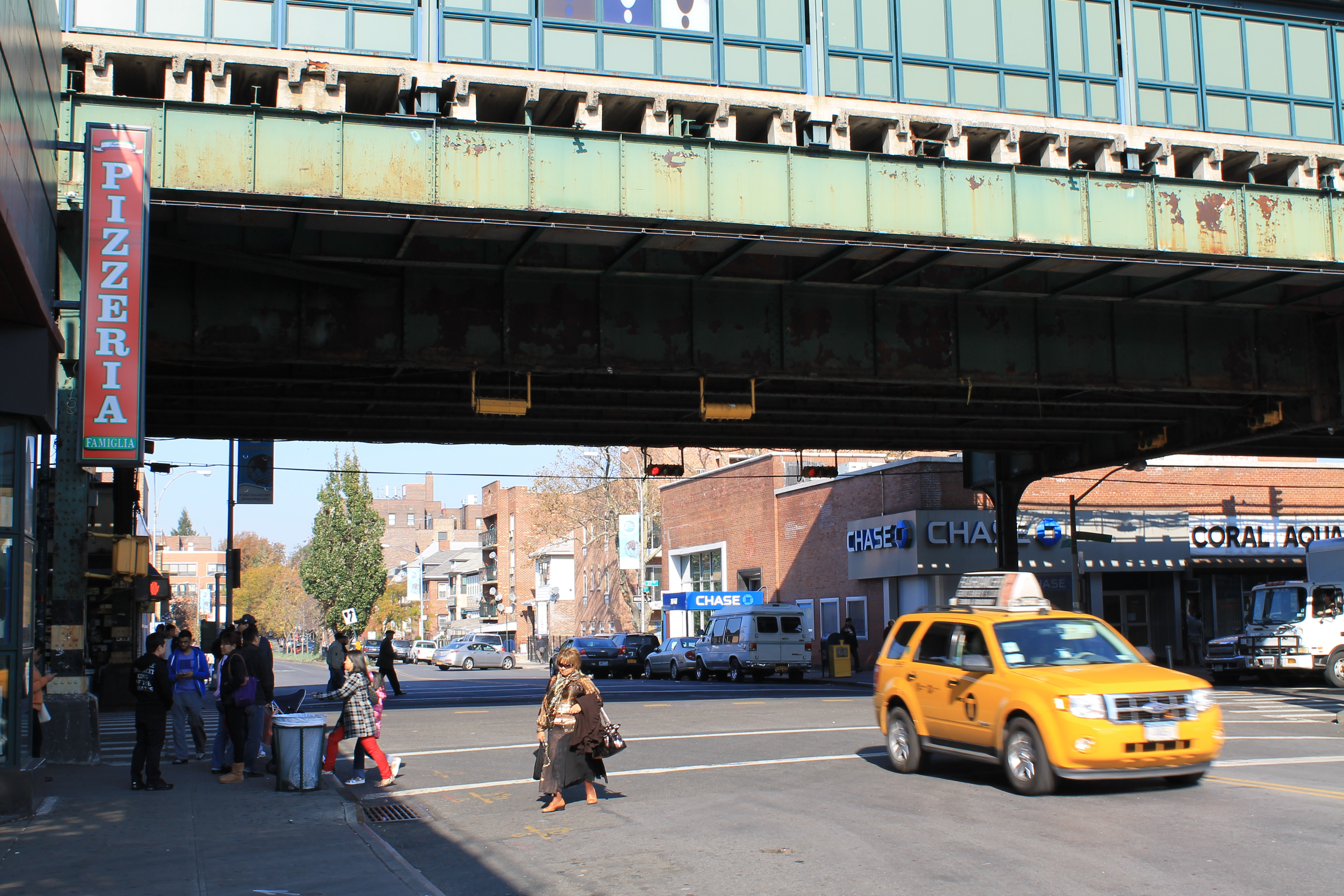
The intersection of 75th Street and Roosevelt Avenue, under the elevated IRT Flushing Line (7 train)

Most residents of Jackson Heights use public transit to get to work, with an average commute time of just over 41 minutes as of 2024.

Jackson Heights-Roosevelt Avenue/74th Street subway station is served by 7, <7>, E, F, <F>, M, and R trains, providing good connections to Manhattan and other parts of Queens. The following is a complete list of New York City Subway stations in Jackson Heights:

- Jackson Heights–Roosevelt Avenue/74th Street (7, <7>, E, F, <F>, M, and R trains)
- 82nd Street–Jackson Heights (7 train)
- 90th Street–Elmhurst Avenue (7 train)
- Junction Boulevard (7 train)

The following MTA Regional Bus Operations bus routes serve Jackson Heights:

- Q29: to Glendale via Hampton Street
- Q32: to Pennsylvania Station in Midtown Manhattan via Roosevelt Avenue and 81st/82nd Streets
- Q33: to Marine Air Terminal via 82nd/83rd Streets
- Q47: to East Elmhurst or Glendale via 73rd/74th Streets
- Q49: to East Elmhurst via 35th Avenue and 89th/90th/92nd Streets
- Q53 SBS: to 61st Street–Woodside (7 and <7> trains)/Woodside LIRR or Rockaway Park–Beach 116th Street (A and S trains) via Roosevelt Avenue and Broadway
- Q63 and Q66: to Queensboro Plaza (7, <7>, N and W trains) or Flushing–Main Street (7 and <7> trains) via Northern Boulevard
- Q70 SBS: to 61st Street–Woodside (7 and <7> trains)/Woodside LIRR or LaGuardia Airport Terminals B/C/D via Roosevelt Avenue, Broadway, and Brooklyn-Queens Expressway
- Q72: to 63rd Drive–Rego Park (M and R trains) or LaGuardia Airport Terminals B/C/D via Junction Boulevard

The Jackson Heights–Roosevelt Avenue/74th Street station is a transportation hub where the subway's 7, <7>, E, F, <F>, M, and R trains and the Q32, Q33, Q47, Q49. Q53 SBS and Q70 SBS buses converge. The MTA spent over $100 million on renovations to the Jackson Heights bus terminal, which were completed in 2005. It includes one of the first green buildings in the MTA system, the Victor A. Moore Bus Terminal, which is partially powered by solar panels built into the roof along the length of the sheds above the Flushing Line platforms. The terminal, like the Victor Moore Arcade (which it replaced), is named after Jackson Heights resident Victor Moore, a Broadway and film actor from the era of silent film to the 1950s.

=== Roads ===
Interstate 278 (Brooklyn Queens Expressway), New York State Route 25A (Northern Boulevard), and the Grand Central Parkway (in the East Elmhurst area) are major roads in the area. LaGuardia Airport, in East Elmhurst, is nearby.

=== Cycling ===
Eleven percent of roads in Jackson Heights have bike lanes, similar to the rate in the city overall. These lanes, part of the city's bikeway system, exist on 34th Avenue, as well as on 74th and 75th streets between 34th Avenue and 37th Road. There is also a short one-block bike lane connector on 37th Road between 74th and 75th streets.

A 2013 study found that residents of Jackson Heights were more likely to ride a bicycle than those in other parts of the city, despite lack of protected bike routes. Citi bike bike share service expanded to Jackson Heights in 2023.

== Notable residents ==
- Nadia Ali (born 1980), Pakistani-American singer-songwriter.
- Alene S. Ammond (1933–2019), politician known as "The Terror of Trenton", who served in the New Jersey Senate from the 6th Legislative District from 1974 to 1978.
- Alfred Mosher Butts (1899–1993), invented Scrabble in 1938, and perfected it at Community Methodist Church.
- Chester Carlson (1906–1968), invented Xerox copy machine in his Jackson Heights kitchen.
- Robert P. Casey (1932–2000), Governor of Pennsylvania from 1987 to 1995.
- Lady Catiria, (1959–1999), drag performer.
- Charlie Chaplin (1899–1977), silent film actor
- Thom Christopher (1940–2024), longtime actor on One Life to Live.
- Eleanor Clift (born 1940), Newsweek contributing editor and regular panelist on The McLaughlin Group.
- Montgomery Clift (1920–1966), actor, moved to Jackson Heights with his family in 1933 and lived in The Chateau apartments.
- Ray Dalio (born 1949), founder of Bridgewater Associates.
- Alan M. Davis (born 1949), professor and author.
- David Diosa (born 1992), footballer for the Richmond Kickers in USL League One.
- Edward Djerejian (born 1939), diplomat, former United States Ambassador to Syria and Israel and Assistant Secretary of State.
- Albert K. Dawson (1885–1967), photojournalist and cinematographer during the First World War, living at 3564, 89th Street, Jackson Heights, between 1928–1967.
- Kevin Dobson (1943–2020), actor, known for his roles on Kojak and Knots Landing.
- Alfred Eisenstaedt (1898–1995), photographer, lived in Jackson Heights for many years.
- Douglas Fairbanks (1883–1939), actor, screenwriter, director, and producer
- Rima Fakih (born 1985), Miss USA 2010.
- Calvin Fixx (1906—1950), editor at Time magazine.
- Dave Fleming (born 1969), MLB pitcher who spent most of his career with the Seattle Mariners.
- Arthur Googy (born 1961 as Joseph McGuckin), original drummer for the band The Misfits.
- Bobby Hackett (1915–1976), trumpet player who played with Henry Mancini, Benny Goodman, and Louis Armstrong
- Ed Hayes (born 1947), influential lawyer, journalist, and memoirist.
- Helen Kane (1904–1966), singer, known for her baby talk version of I Wanna Be Loved by You and model for Betty Boop.
- Evelyn Fox Keller (1936–2023), physicist, author and feminist, who is Professor Emerita of History and Philosophy of Science at the Massachusetts Institute of Technology.
- Richard Kline (born 1944), actor who played Jack's friend Larry on Three's Company.
- John Leguizamo (born 1964), comedian, actor.
- Willy Ley (1906–1969), space writer and theorist.
- Peter Anthony Libasci (born 1951), Tenth Bishop of the Roman Catholic Diocese of Manchester.
- Lucy Liu (born 1968), actress.
- Clive Lythgoe (1927–2006), classical pianist.
- John McWhorter (born 1965), linguist and author.
- Victor Moore (1876–1962), actor.
- Billy Murcia (1954–1972), original drummer for the New York Dolls.
- Carroll O'Connor (1924—2001), actor, director, producer
- Colby O'Donis (born 1989), pop and R&B singer-songwriter, guitarist, producer and actor.
- Jakiw Palij (1923–2019), former Nazi concentration camp guard; emigrated to U.S. in 1949, deported in 2018 aged 95.
- Les Paul (1915–2009), jazz guitarist and guitar innovator.
- Duncan Penwarden (1880–1930), actor.
- Joe Quesada (born 1962), Editor-in-Chief of Marvel Comics.
- Tommy Rettig (1941–1996), actor who appeared on the 1950s Lassie television series.
- Don Rickles (1926–2017), comedian.
- Robert Tripp Ross (1903–1981), Congressman and former Assistant Secretary of Defense from 1954 to 1957.
- Mercedes Ruehl (born 1948), actress.
- Zoe Saldaña (born 1978), actress
- Susan Sarandon (born 1946), actress.
- Eddie August Schneider (1911–1940), record-setting early aviator.
- Walter Sear (1930–2010), audio engineer.
- Gene Simmons (born 1949), of the rock group Kiss.
- Howard Stern (born 1954), host of The Howard Stern Show.
- Bruce Sussman (born 1949), songwriter, best known for his work with Barry Manilow.
- Maria Terrone, poet and writer.
- Sada Thompson (1927–2011), award-winning actress.
- Johnny Thunders (1952–1991), of the New York Dolls.
- Waddy Wachtel (born 1947), session guitarist.
- Raees Warsi (born 1963), Urdu poet, writer and TV anchor.
- Helene White (born 1954), federal judge on the United States Court of Appeals for the Sixth Circuit.

== In popular culture ==
- Much of the Alfred Hitchcock film The Wrong Man (1956) takes place within a few blocks of the intersection of Broadway and 74th Street.
- The theme song of the TV show Car 54 Where Are You? (1961–63) has a line that goes: "There's a traffic jam in Harlem that's backed up to Jackson Heights".
- Ingrid Bergman's character Stephanie Dickinson in the movie Cactus Flower (1969) lives in Jackson Heights.
- In Cagney & Lacey (1988), the fictional character Mary Beth Lacey and her family live in an apartment in Jackson Heights.
- In Coming to America (1988), the fictional singer Randy Watson is referred to as "Jackson Heights' own".
- Jackson Heights is mentioned in Del Amitri's song "Surface of the Moon", from the 1992 album Change Everything.
- Part of The Usual Suspects (1995) was filmed in Jackson Heights around 34th Avenue and 82nd Street.
- Portions of Random Hearts (1999) were filmed in Jackson Heights on 35th Avenue between 76th and 77th streets.
- Major portions of the Academy Award–nominated Maria Full of Grace (2004) were filmed on location in Jackson Heights.
- It is also the setting for the TV show Ugly Betty (2006–10), where Betty and her family live.
- Parts of director James Gray's We Own the Night (2007) were filmed between 32nd Avenue and 31st Avenue on 84th Street.
- The eponymous Pakistani drama Jackson Heights is set in this neighborhood and deals with the lives of Pakistanis living in New York City.
- In season 5 of AMC's Mad Men (2012), Ken Cosgrove and his family reside in Jackson Heights
- The documentary film In Jackson Heights (2015) by Frederick Wiseman explores the diversity of people in the neighborhood.
- The HBO series The Night Of (2016) was partially filmed around 37th Avenue and 74th Street.
- The 2018 movie Ocean's 8 was partly filmed in Jackson Heights, with scenes shot on 74th Street.
- In 2021 Jackson Heights and the Jackson Heights Post Office were featured in an episode of Sesame Street.
