= Joseph Hooker =

American Union Army general (1814–1879)

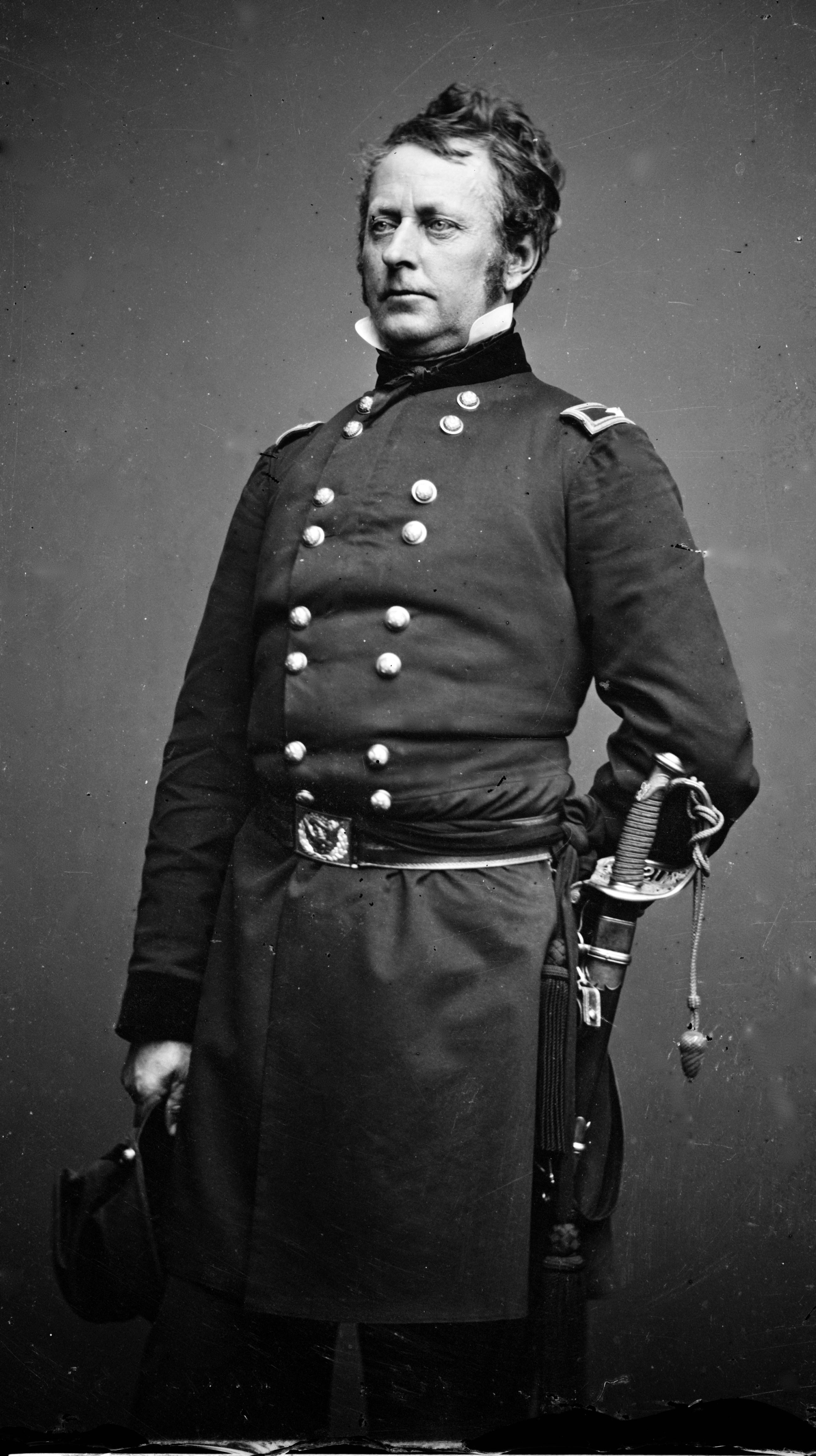
- Portrait by Mathew Brady or Levin C. Handy
- Born: November 13, 1814; Hadley, Massachusetts, U.S.
- Died: October 31, 1879 (aged 64); Garden City, New York, U.S.
- Burial place: Spring Grove Cemetery; Cincinnati, Ohio
- Alma mater: United States Military Academy (BS)
- Military career
- Allegiance: United States of America; Union
- Branch: United States Army; Californian militia
- Service years: 1837–1853, 1861–1868 (U.S.); 1859–1861 (California)
- Rank: Major General (U.S.); Colonel (California)
- Nickname: "Fighting Joe"
- Commands: I Corps; Army of the Potomac; XX Corps, Army of the Tennessee; Department of the East
- Conflicts: Seminole Wars; Mexican–American War; American Civil War; Battle of Williamsburg; Battle of Antietam (WIA); Battle of Fredericksburg; Battle of Chancellorsville; Chattanooga campaign; Battle of Lookout Mountain; Battle of Ringgold Gap; Atlanta campaign

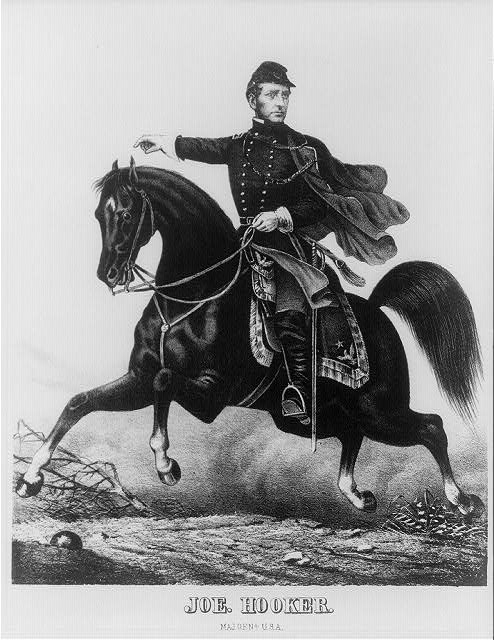
Hooker in an 1863 engraving

Joseph Hooker (November 13, 1814 – October 31, 1879) was an American Civil War general for the Union, chiefly remembered for his decisive defeat by Confederate general Robert E. Lee at the Battle of Chancellorsville in 1863. Hooker had served in the Seminole Wars and the Mexican–American War, receiving three brevet promotions, before resigning from the Army. At the start of the Civil War, he joined the Union side as a brigadier general, distinguishing himself at Williamsburg, Antietam and Fredericksburg, after which he was given command of the Army of the Potomac.

His ambitious plan for Chancellorsville was thwarted by Lee's bold move in dividing his army and routing a Union corps, as well as by mistakes on the part of Hooker's subordinate generals and his own loss of nerve. The defeat handed Lee the initiative, which allowed him to travel north to Gettysburg. Hooker was kept in command, but when General Halleck and Lincoln declined his request for reinforcements, he resigned. George G. Meade was appointed to command the Army of the Potomac three days before Gettysburg.

Hooker returned to combat in November 1863, helping to relieve the besieged Union Army at Chattanooga, Tennessee, and continuing in the Western Theater under Maj. Gen. William T. Sherman, but departed in protest before the end of the Atlanta campaign when he was passed over for promotion. Hooker became known as "Fighting Joe" following a journalist's clerical error, and the nickname stuck. His personal reputation was as a hard-drinking ladies' man, and his headquarters was known for parties and gambling.

== Early years ==
Hooker was born on November 13, 1814, in Hadley, Massachusetts, the grandson of a captain in the American Revolutionary War. He was of entirely English ancestry, all of whom had been in New England since the early 1600s. His initial schooling was at the local Hopkins Academy. He graduated from the United States Military Academy in 1837, ranked 29th out of a class of 50, and was commissioned a second lieutenant in Company F, 1st U.S. Artillery. His initial assignment was in Florida fighting in the second of the Seminole Wars. He served in the Mexican–American War on the staff of five senior commanders: Persifor F. Smith, George Cadwalader, Thomas L. Hamer, William O. Butler, and Gideon J. Pillow. He received brevet promotions for his staff leadership and gallantry in three battles: Monterrey (to captain), National Bridge (major), and Chapultepec (lieutenant colonel). His future Army reputation as a ladies' man began in Mexico, where local women referred to him as the "Handsome Captain". In 1848, his military reputation was damaged when he testified in the support of the court of inquiry of Gideon Johnson Pillow charged with insubordination. By virtue of him testifying in support of Pillow, Hooker testified against Winfield Scott.

After the Mexican–American War (which ended in 1848), he served as an assistant adjutant general of the Pacific Division in Sonoma, California, under the command of Persifor F. Smith and then Ethan A. Hitchcock. To raise funds for land speculation in Sonoma during California's gold rush, acting as a government agent, Hooker purchased hay at market prices. He then sold it to the army at double the price. Hooker was arrested on November 25, 1851, and charged with conduct unbecoming an officer and a gentleman because of his profiteering activities. His court martial was held in December 1851. The judge advocate for his trial was Henry W. Halleck. Although Halleck proved Hooker's guilt, he was found not guilty only because there was no law or army regulation against profiteering. The War Department quickly enacted a regulation that prohibited officers from entering into contracts with the government. Immediately after the trial, Hooker was forced to go on leave. If he wanted to stay in the army, it would not be on the west coast so he resigned his commission effective February 21, 1853.

While on leave, Hooker moved to his recently purchased 550-acre farm part of Rancho Agua Caliente in Sonoma Valley. However, he constantly struggled with debt from significant poker losses, failed farming efforts, and multiple lawsuits. He ran unsuccessfully in the 1853 election to represent the Sonoma District in the California State Assembly. Heavily in debt, he was unhappy and unsuccessful in his civilian pursuits. In 1858, he wrote to Secretary of War John B. Floyd to request that his name "be presented to president Buchanan as a candidate for a lieutenant colonelcy", but nothing came of his request. He made numerous other attempts to re-enter the army, but was continuously blocked by Winfield Scott. From 1859 to 1861, he held a commission as a colonel in the California militia.

== Civil War ==
At the start of the Civil War in 1861, Hooker requested a commission, but his applications were rejected because of the lingering resentment harbored by Winfield Scott, general-in-chief of the Army. A friend gave $1,000 to Hooker to clear his debts and book passage east from California. After he witnessed the Union Army defeat at the First Battle of Bull Run, he wrote a letter to President Abraham Lincoln that complained of military mismanagement, promoted his own qualifications, and again requested a commission. He was appointed, in August 1861, as brigadier general of volunteers to rank from May 17. He commanded a brigade and then division around Washington, D.C., as part of the effort to organize and train the new Army of the Potomac, under Maj. Gen. George B. McClellan.

=== 1862 ===
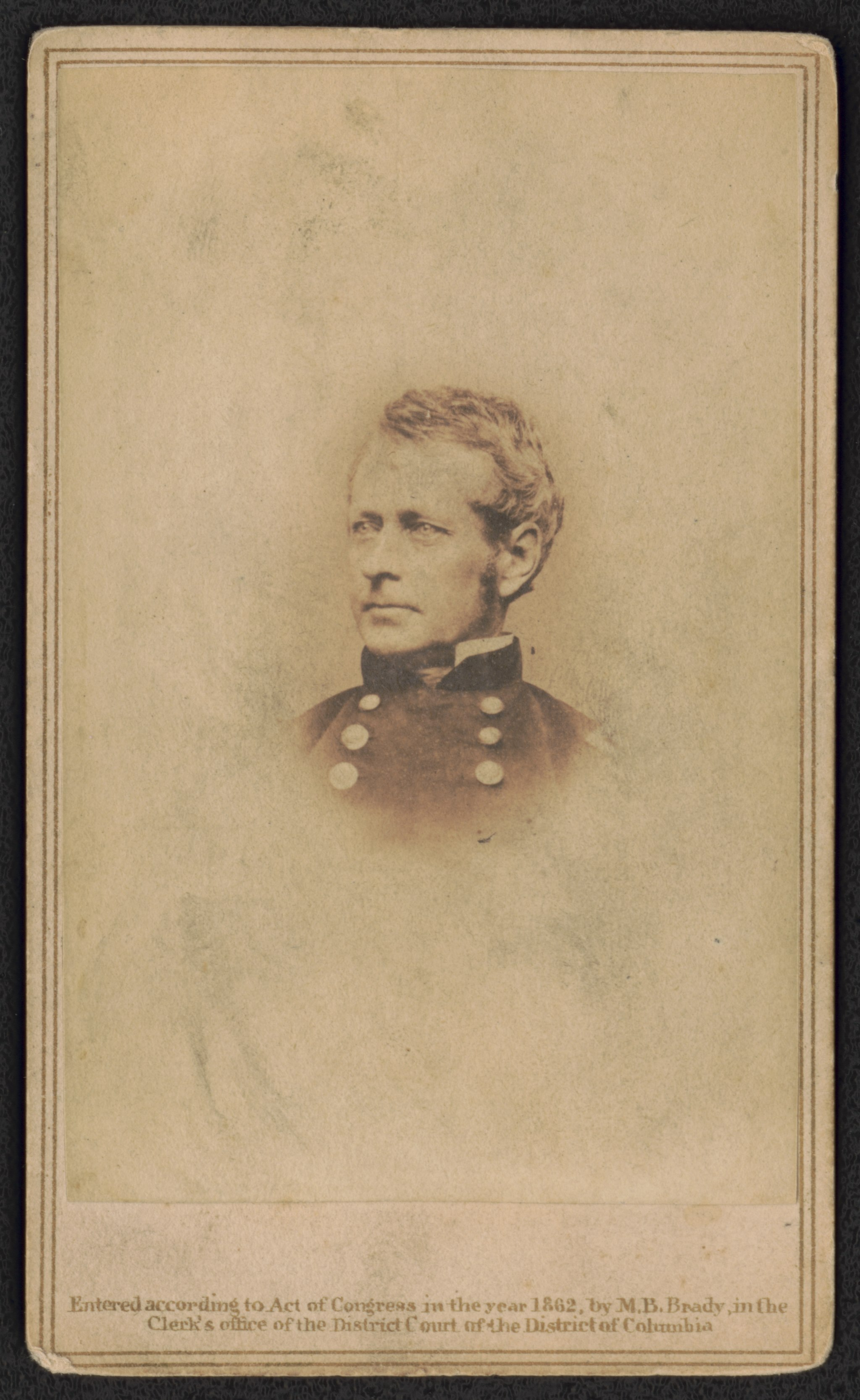
Major General Joseph Hooker, 1862. From the Liljenquist Family Collection of Civil War Photographs, Prints and Photographs Division, Library of Congress. Photograph by Mathew Brady

In the Peninsula Campaign of 1862, Hooker commanded the 2nd Division of the III Corps and made a good name for himself as a combat leader who handled himself well and aggressively sought out the key points on battlefields. He led his division with distinction at Williamsburg and at Seven Pines. Hooker's division did not play a major role in the Seven Days Battles, although he and fellow division commander Phil Kearny tried unsuccessfully to urge McClellan to counterattack the Confederates. He chafed at the cautious generalship of McClellan and openly criticized his failure to capture Richmond. Of his commander, Hooker said, "He is not only not a soldier, but he does not know what soldiership is." The Peninsula cemented two further reputations of Hooker's: his devotion to the welfare and morale of his men, and his hard-drinking social life, even on the battlefield.

On July 26, Hooker was promoted to major general, ranked from May 5. During the Second Battle of Bull Run, the III Corps was sent to reinforce John Pope's Army of Virginia. Following Second Bull Run, Hooker replaced Irvin McDowell as commander of the Army of Virginia's III Corps, which soon was redesignated the I Corps of the Army of the Potomac. During the Maryland Campaign, Hooker led the I Corps at South Mountain; and at Antietam, his corps launched the first assault of the bloodiest day in American history, driving south into the corps of Lt. Gen. Stonewall Jackson, where they fought each other to a standstill. Hooker, aggressive and inspiring to his men, left the battle early in the morning with a foot wound. He asserted that the battle would have been a decisive Union victory if he had managed to stay on the field, but General McClellan's caution once again failed the Northern troops, and Lee's much smaller army eluded destruction. With his patience at an end, President Lincoln replaced McClellan with Maj. Gen. Ambrose Burnside. Although Hooker had criticized McClellan persistently, the latter was apparently unaware of it, and in early October, shortly before his termination, had recommended that Hooker receive a promotion to brigadier general in the regular army. The War Department promptly acted on this recommendation, and Hooker received his brigadier's commission to rank from September 20. This promotion ensured that he would remain a general after the war was over, retire as a general, and be entitled to a general's pay and pension.

The December 1862 Battle of Fredericksburg was another Union debacle. Upon recovering from his foot wound, Hooker was briefly made commander of V Corps but was then promoted to "Grand Division" command, with a command that consisted of both III and V Corps. Hooker derided Burnside's plan to assault the fortified heights behind the city, deeming them "preposterous". His Grand Division (particularly V Corps) suffered serious losses in fourteen futile assaults ordered by Burnside over Hooker's protests. Burnside followed up this battle with the humiliating Mud March in January and Hooker's criticism of his commander bordered on formal insubordination. He described Burnside as a "wretch ... of blundering sacrifice." Burnside planned a wholesale purge of his subordinates, including Hooker, and drafted an order for the president's approval. He stated that Hooker was "unfit to hold an important commission during a crisis like the present." But Lincoln's patience had again run out, and he removed Burnside instead.

=== Army of the Potomac ===
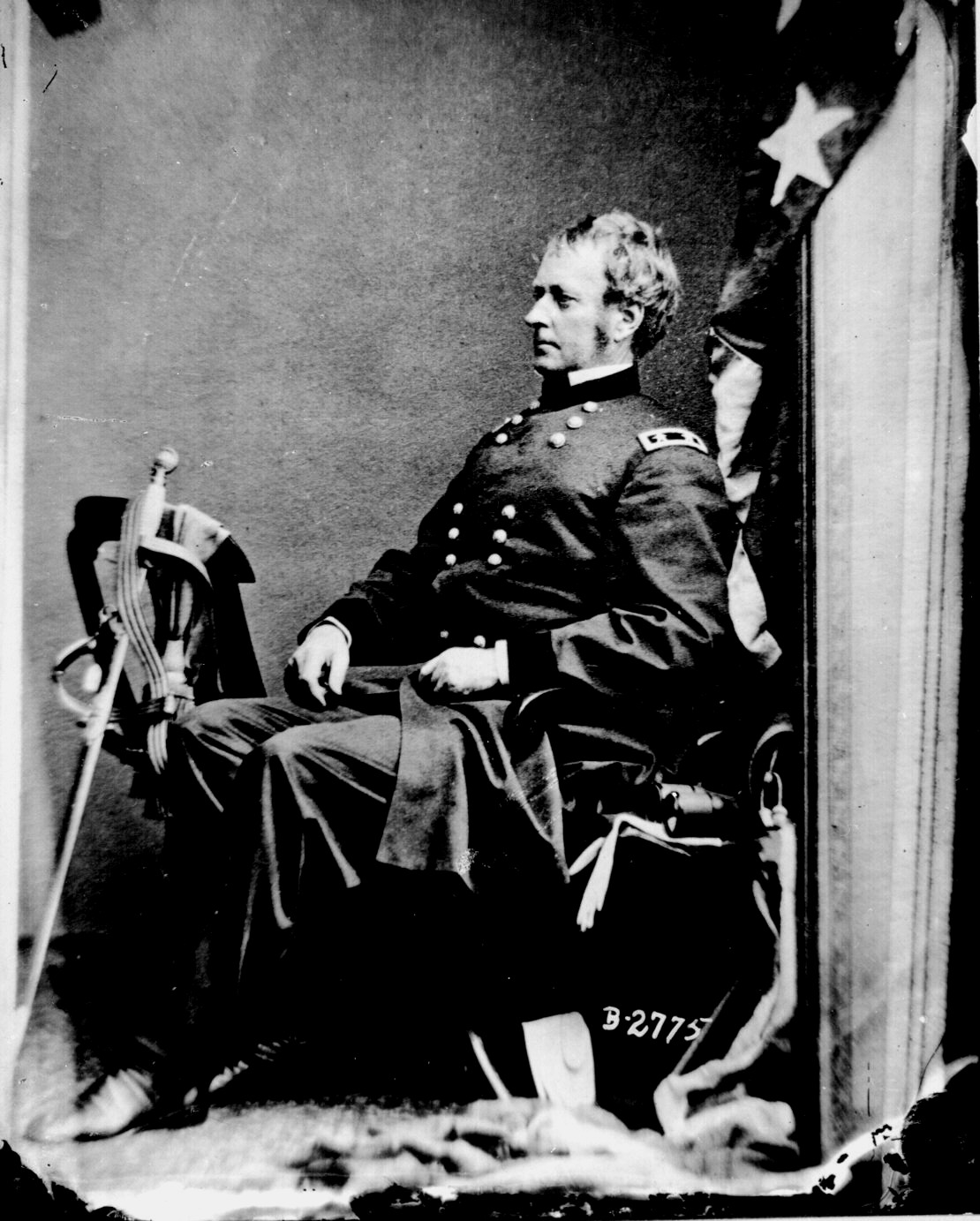
Major General Joseph Hooker, c. 1860–1865

Lincoln appointed Hooker to command the Army of the Potomac on January 26, 1863. Some members of the army saw this move as inevitable, given Hooker's reputation for aggressive fighting, something sorely lacking in his predecessors. During the "Mud March", Hooker was quoted by a New York Times army correspondent as saying that "Nothing would go right until we had a dictator, and the sooner the better." Lincoln wrote a letter to the newly appointed general, part of which stated,

I have heard, in such a way as to believe it, of your recently saying that both the Army and the Government needed a Dictator. Of course, it was not for this, but in spite of it, that I have given you the command. Only those generals who gain success can set up dictators. What I now ask of you is military success, and I will risk the dictatorship.

During the spring of 1863, Hooker established a reputation as an outstanding administrator and restored the morale of his soldiers, which had plummeted to a new low under Burnside. Among his changes were fixes to the daily diet of the troops (by issuing flour or soft bread four times a week, fresh onions or potatoes twice a week and desiccated vegetables once a week), camp sanitary changes (such as regular airing of bedding, men having to bathe twice a week), improvements and accountability of the quartermaster system, addition of and monitoring of company cooks, several hospital reforms, and an improved furlough system (two man per company by lot, 10 days for mid-Atlantic states, 15 days to northern and western states). He created the Bureau of Military Information, which was the first all-source intelligence organization employed by the U.S. military. He also implemented corps badges as a means of identifying units during battle or when marching and to instill unit pride in the men. Other orders addressed the need to stem rising desertion (one from Lincoln combined with incoming mail review, the ability to shoot deserters, and better camp picket lines), more and better drills, stronger officer training, and, for the first time, combining the federal cavalry into a single corps. The corps badge idea was suggested by Hooker's chief of staff, Daniel Butterfield. Hooker said of his revived army:

I have the finest army on the planet. I have the finest army the sun ever shone on. ... If the enemy does not run, God help them. May God have mercy on General Lee, for I will have none.

Also during this winter, Hooker made several high-level command changes, including with his corps commanders. Both "Left Grand Division" commander Maj. Gen. William B. Franklin, who vowed that he would not serve under Hooker, and II Corps commander Maj. Gen. Edwin Vose Sumner was relieved of command, on Burnside's recommendation, in the same order appointing Hooker to command. The IX Corps was a potential source of embarrassment or friction within the army because it was Burnside's old corps, so it was detached as a separate organization and sent to the Virginia Peninsula under the command of Brig. Gen. William F. "Baldy" Smith, former commander of VI Corps. (Both Franklin and Smith were considered suspects by Hooker because of their previous political maneuvering against Burnside and on behalf of McClellan.)

For the important position of chief of staff, Hooker asked the War Department to send him Brig. Gen. Charles Stone; however, this was denied. Stone had been relieved, arrested, and imprisoned for his role in the Battle of Ball's Bluff in the fall of 1861, despite the lack of any trial. Stone did not receive a command upon his release, mostly due to political pressures, which left him militarily exiled and disgraced. Army of the Potomac historian and author Bruce Catton termed this request by Hooker "a strange and seemingly uncharacteristic thing" and "one of the most interesting things he ever did." Hooker never explained why he asked for Stone, but Catton believed:

[Hooker] laid schemes and calculations aside and for one brief moment stood up as a straightforward soldier who would defy politics and politicians. ... It is a point to remember because to speak up for General Stone took moral courage, a quality which Joe Hooker is rarely accused of possessing.

Despite this, Fighting Joe would set a very bad example for the conduct of generals and their staff and subordinates. His headquarters in Falmouth, Virginia, was described by cavalry officer Charles F. Adams, Jr., as being a combination of a "bar-room and a brothel". He built a network of loyal political cronies that included Maj. Gen. Dan Butterfield for chief of staff, and the notorious political general, Maj. Gen. Daniel E. Sickles, for command of the III Corps.

==== Chancellorsville ====
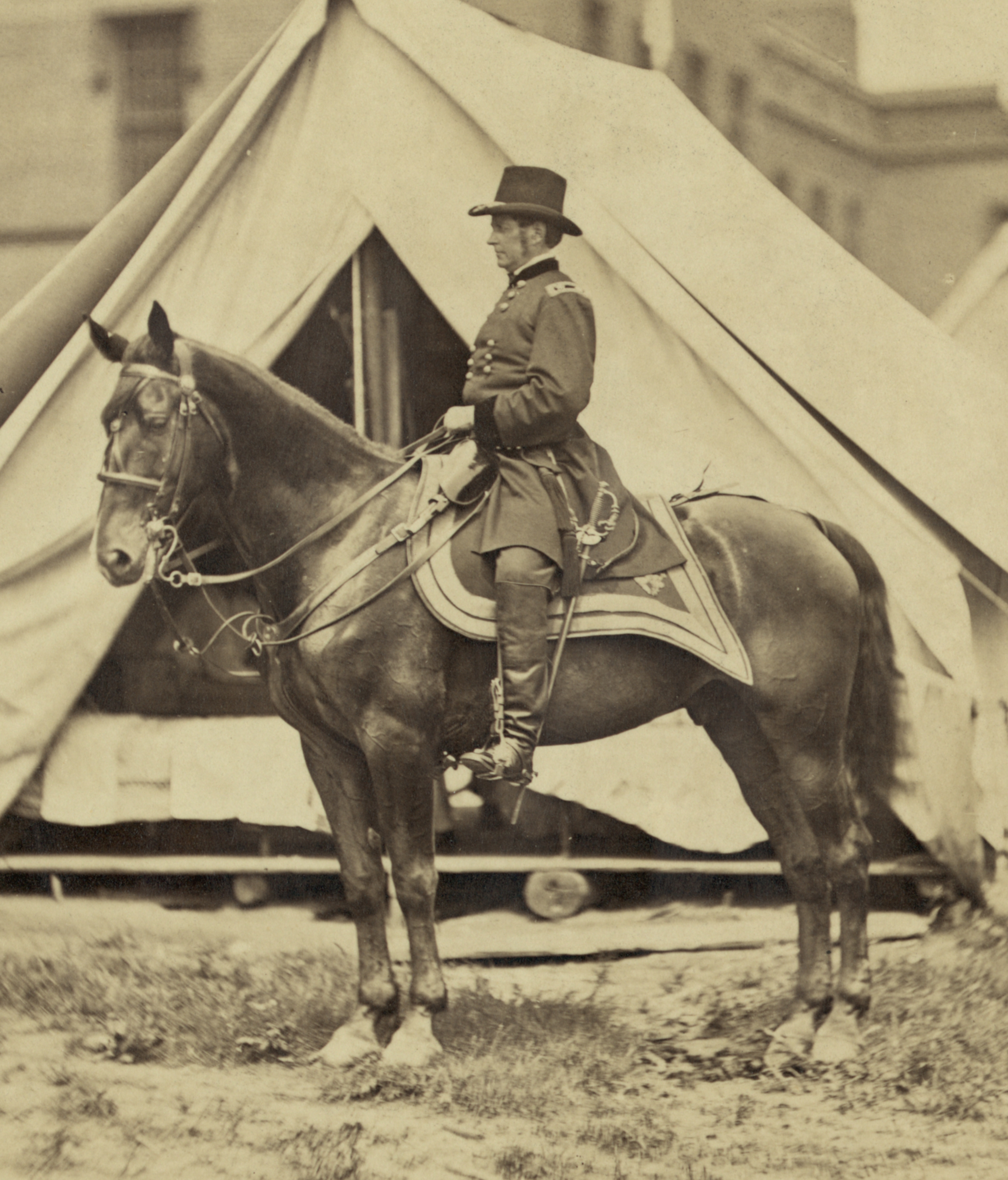
General "Fightin' Joe" Hooker

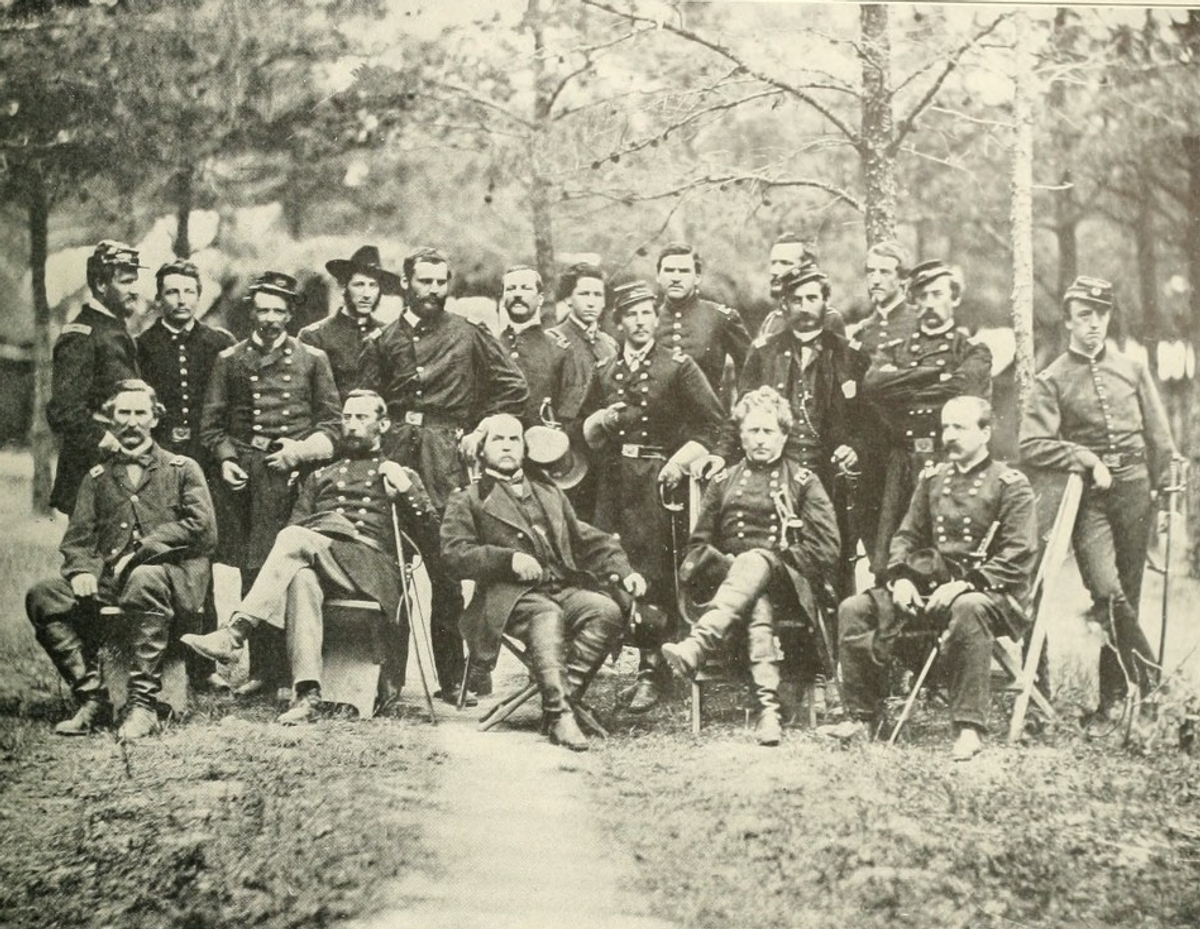
Union General Joseph Hooker (seated second to right) and his staff, 1863

Hooker's plan for the spring and summer campaign was both elegant and promising. He first planned to send his cavalry corps deep into the enemy's rear, disrupting supply lines and distracting him from the main attack. He would pin down Robert E. Lee's much smaller army at Fredericksburg while taking the large bulk of the Army of the Potomac on a flanking march to strike Lee in his rear. Defeating Lee, he could move on to seize Richmond. Unfortunately for Hooker and the Union, the execution of his plan did not match the elegance of the plan itself. The cavalry raid was conducted cautiously by its commander, Brig. Gen. George Stoneman, and met none of its objectives. The flanking march went well enough, achieving strategic surprise, but when he attempted to advance with three columns, Stonewall Jackson's surprise attack on May 1 pushed Hooker back and caused him to withdraw his troops. From there, Hooker pulled his army back to Chancellorsville and waited for Lee to attack. Lee audaciously split his smaller army in two to deal with both parts of Hooker's army. Then, he split again, sending Stonewall Jackson's corps on its own flanking march, striking Hooker's exposed right flank and routing the Union XI Corps. The Army of the Potomac dropped into a purely defensive mode and eventually was forced to retreat.

The Battle of Chancellorsville has been called "Lee's perfect battle" because of his ability to vanquish a much larger foe through audacious tactics. Part of Hooker's failure can be attributed to an encounter with a cannonball; while he was standing on the porch of his headquarters, the missile struck a wooden column against which he was leaning, initially knocking him senseless, and then putting him out of action for the rest of the day with a concussion. Despite his incapacitation, he refused entreaties to turn over temporary command of the army to his second-in-command, Maj. Gen. Darius N. Couch. Several of his subordinate generals, including Couch and Maj. Gen. Henry W. Slocum, openly questioned Hooker's command decisions. Couch was so disgusted that he refused to ever serve under Hooker again. Political winds blew strongly in the following weeks as generals maneuvered to overthrow Hooker or to position themselves if Lincoln decided on his own to do so.

Robert E. Lee once again began an invasion of the North in June 1863, and Lincoln urged Hooker to pursue and defeat him. Hooker's initial plan was to seize Richmond instead, but Lincoln immediately vetoed that idea, so the Army of the Potomac began to march north, attempting to locate Lee's Army of Northern Virginia as it slipped down the Shenandoah Valley into Pennsylvania. Hooker's mission was first to protect Washington, D.C., and Baltimore and second to intercept and defeat Lee. Unfortunately, Lincoln was losing any remaining confidence he had in Hooker. Hooker's senior officers expressed to Lincoln their lack of confidence in Hooker, as did Henry W. Halleck, Lincoln's General-in-chief. When Hooker got into a dispute with Army headquarters over the status of defensive forces in Harpers Ferry, he impulsively offered his resignation in protest, which was quickly accepted by Lincoln and Halleck. On June 28, 1863, three days before the Battle of Gettysburg, Hooker was replaced by Maj. Gen. George Meade. Hooker received the Thanks of Congress for his role at the start of the Gettysburg campaign, but the glory would go to Meade. Hooker's tenure as head of the Army of the Potomac had lasted five months.

=== Western Theater ===
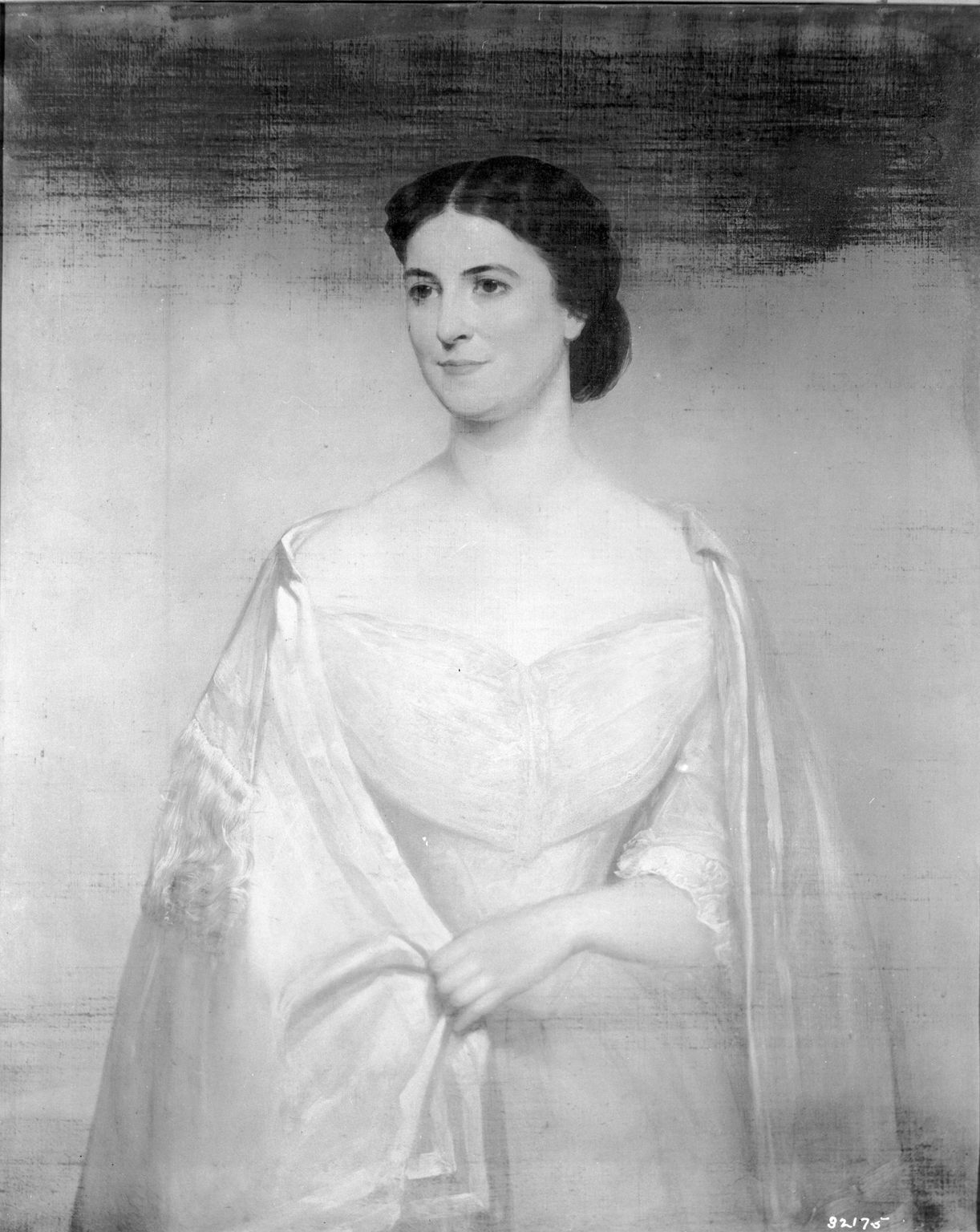
Olivia Groesbeck Hooker

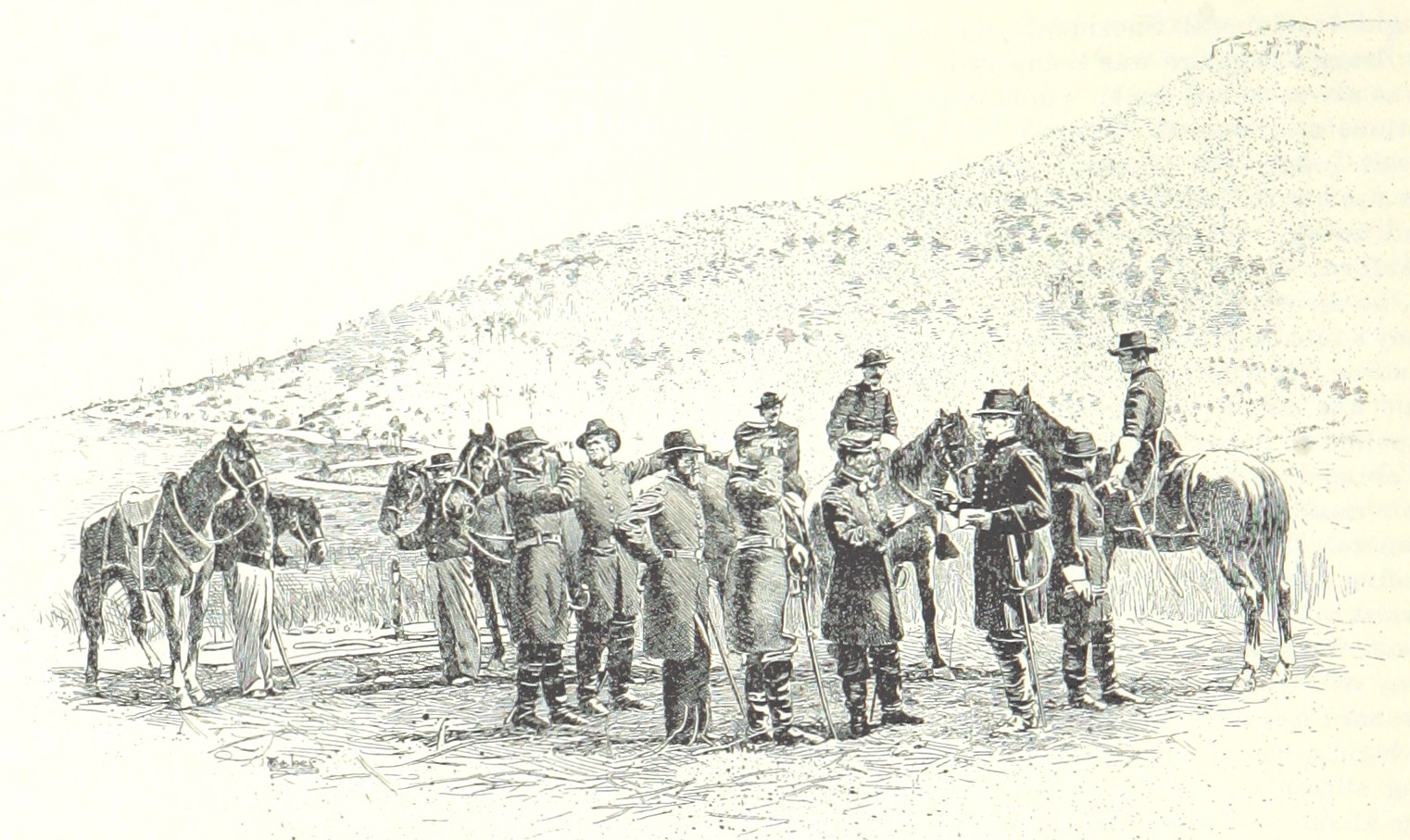
Hooker and his staff at Lookout Mountain

Hooker's military career was not ended by his poor performance in the summer of 1863. He went on to regain a reputation as a solid corps commander when he was transferred with the XI and XII Corps of the Army of the Potomac westward to reinforce the Army of the Cumberland around Chattanooga, Tennessee. Hooker was in command at the Battle of Lookout Mountain, playing an important role in Lt. Gen. Ulysses S. Grant's decisive victory at the Battle of Chattanooga. He was brevetted to major general in the regular army for his success at Chattanooga, but he was disappointed to find that Grant's official report of the battle credited William Tecumseh Sherman's contribution over Hooker's.

Hooker led his corps (now designated the XX Corps) competently in the 1864 Atlanta campaign under Sherman but when Army of the Tennessee commander James B. McPherson was killed in July during the battles around Atlanta, Sherman appointed XI Corps commander Oliver O. Howard to command the army instead. Hooker was offended at this gesture as he outranked Howard and had blamed him for the defeat at Chancellorsville. He also had very poor relations with XII Corps commander Henry W. Slocum ever since that battle and Slocum was relieved at being reassigned and sent to command the Vicksburg garrison. Sherman did not have a very positive opinion of Hooker and readily accepted his resignation. Upon hearing of Hooker's protests at being turned down for army command despite his seniority, Grant remarked, "A major general is only entitled to command of a division." Hooker's biographer reports that there were numerous stories indicating that Abraham Lincoln attempted to intercede with Sherman, urging that Hooker be appointed to command the Army of the Tennessee, but Sherman threatened to resign if the president insisted. However, due to "obvious gaps" in the Official Records, the story cannot be verified.

After leaving Georgia, Hooker commanded the Northern Department (comprising the states of Michigan, Ohio, Indiana, and Illinois), headquartered in Cincinnati, Ohio, from October 1, 1864, until the end of the war. While in Cincinnati he married Olivia Groesbeck, sister of Congressman William S. Groesbeck.

== Final years ==
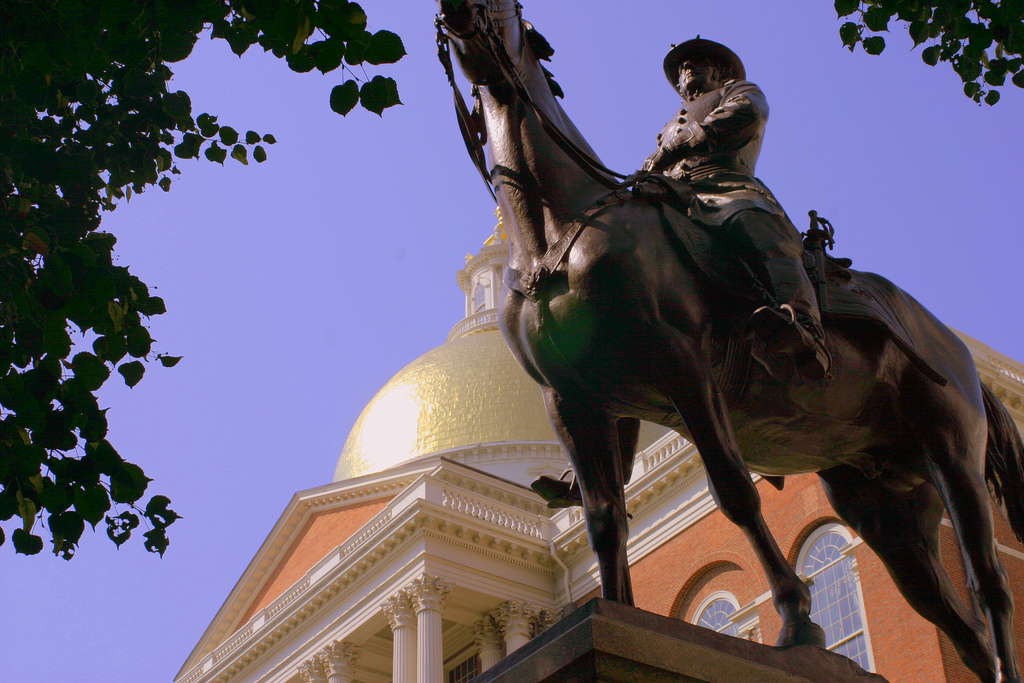
Hooker's equestrian statue at the Massachusetts State House

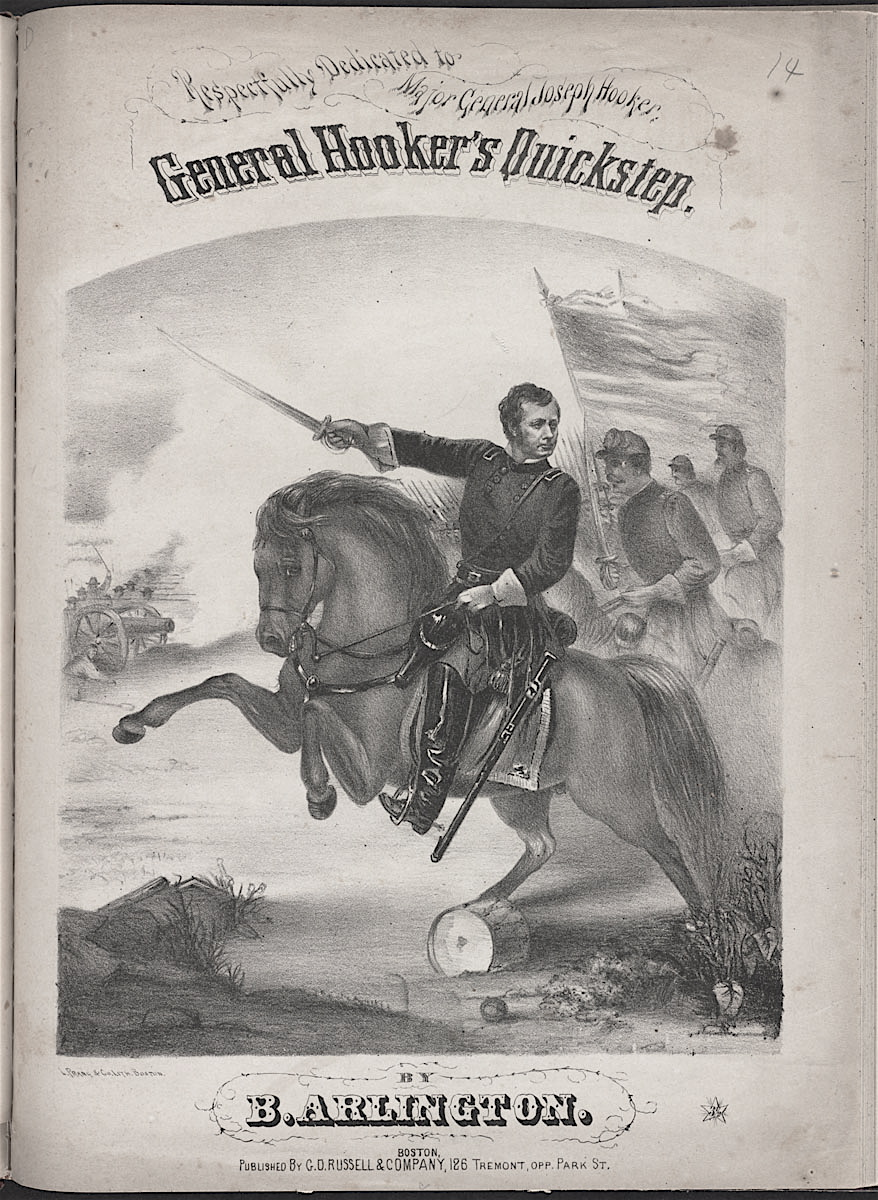
General Hooker's Quickstep, sheet music, 19th century

After the war, Hooker led Lincoln's funeral procession in Springfield on May 4, 1865. He served in command of the Department of the East and Department of the Lakes following the war. His postbellum life was marred by poor health and he was partially paralyzed by a stroke. He was mustered out of the volunteer service on September 1, 1866, and retired from the U.S. Army on October 15, 1868, with the regular army rank of major general. He died on October 31, 1879, while on a visit to Garden City, New York, and is buried in Spring Grove Cemetery, Cincinnati, Ohio, his wife's hometown.

== Legacy ==
Hooker was popularly known as "Fighting Joe" Hooker, a nickname he regretted deeply; he said, "People will think I am a highwayman or a bandit." When a newspaper dispatch arrived in New York during the Peninsula Campaign, a typographical error changed the entry "Fighting – Joe Hooker Attacks Rebels" to remove the dash and the name stuck. Robert E. Lee occasionally referred to him as "Mr. F. J. Hooker" in a mildly sarcastic jab at his opponent.

Hooker's reputation as a hard-drinking ladies' man was established through rumors in the pre-Civil War Army and has been cited by a number of popular histories. Biographer Walter H. Hebert describes the general's personal habits as the "subject of much debate" although there was little debate in the popular opinion of the time. His men parodied Hooker in the popular war song Marching Along. The lines

McClellan's our leader,
He's gallant and strong

were replaced by

Joe Hooker's our leader,
He takes his whiskey strong.

Historian Stephen W. Sears, however, states that there is no basis for the claims that Hooker was a heavy drinker or that he was ever intoxicated on the battlefield.

The widespread belief that the slang term "hooker," referring to a prostitute, originates from General Hooker's surname due to illicit gatherings and insufficient military discipline at his headquarters near the Murder Bay district of Washington, DC, has persisted in popular culture. Certain iterations of this legend suggest that the contingent of prostitutes who followed his division were pejoratively labeled as "General Hooker's Army" or "Hooker's Brigade." Nevertheless, historical evidence demonstrates that the term "hooker" appeared in published sources as early as 1845, predating General Hooker's rise to public prominence. Linguistic and historical scholarship instead points to the term’s likely derivation from the significant population of prostitutes in the Corlear’s Hook area of Manhattan during the early to mid-19th century, where the appellation "hooker" became commonplace. While the enduring association between the general's name and the term may have contributed to its broader popularization, contemporary evidence indicates that an area in Washington, DC known for prostitution during the Civil War was colloquially identified as "Hooker's Division"—a label later abbreviated to "The Division" during General Hooker’s tenure in the city following the First Battle of Bull Run, where he was tasked with defending the capital. Consequently, the link between the term and General Hooker, though culturally persistent, is undermined by substantial historical documentation that favors alternative etymologies.

There is an equestrian statue of General Hooker outside the Massachusetts State House in Boston, and Hooker County in Nebraska is named for him.

In Sonoma, where he settled before the Civil War, his historic house near Sonoma Plaza currently houses a winery office and tasting room, and a thoroughfare in nearby Agua Caliente is named Hooker Avenue in his honor.

== See also ==
- List of American Civil War generals (Union)
- List of Massachusetts generals in the American Civil War
- Massachusetts in the American Civil War

== Sources ==
- Axelrod, Alan (2011). Generals South, Generals North: The Commanders of the Civil War Reconsidered. Rowman & Littlefield. ISBN 978-0762774883.
- Bates, Samuel P. (1888). "Hooker's Comments on Chancellorsville". In Johnson, Robert Underwood; Buel, Clarence Clough (eds.). Battles and Leaders of the Civil War. Vol. 3. New York: The Century Company. OCLC 2048818.
- Burrows, Edwin G.; Wallace, Mike (1999). Gotham: A History of New York City to 1898. New York: Oxford University Press. ISBN 978-0-19-511634-2.
- Catton, Bruce (1952). Glory Road. Garden City, New York: Doubleday and Company. OCLC 18404534.
- Eicher, John H.; Eicher, David J. (2001). Civil War High Commands. Stanford: Stanford University Press. ISBN 0-8047-3641-3.
- Foote, Shelby (1958). The Civil War: A Narrative. Vol. 2: Fredericksburg to Meridian. New York: Random House. OCLC 300064.
- Gragg, Isaac Paul (1900). Homes of the Massachusetts ancestors of Major General Joseph Hooker. Boston: Privately printed. OCLC 1853063.
- Hebert, Walter H. (1987) [1944]. Fighting Joe Hooker. Gaithersburg, Maryland: Butternut Press. ISBN 978-0-913419-53-3.
- Sears, Stephen W. (1996). Chancellorsville. Boston: Houghton Mifflin. ISBN 0-395-87744-X.
- Sears, Stephen W. (2003). Gettysburg. New York: Houghton Mifflin Harcourt Publishing Company. ISBN 978-0-395-86761-7.
- Tsouras, Peter G. (2018). Major General George H. Sharpe and the Creation of American Military Intelligence in the Civil War. Havertown, Pennsylvania: Casemate. ISBN 978-1-61200-647-5.
- Wagner, Travis P. (2026). Military Honor on Trial: The Saga of Joseph Hooker and George H. Derby. Sequoia Grove Press. 979-8-9959916-2-5.

Military offices
Preceded by James B. Ricketts	Commander of the III Corps (Army of Virginia); 6 September 1862 – 12 September 1862	Succeeded by Reorganized as I Corps (Army of the Potomac)
Preceded by Himself as Commander of III Corps (Army of Virginia)	Commander of the I Corps (Army of the Potomac); 12 September 1862 – 17 September 1862	Succeeded by George G. Meade
Preceded by Fitz John Porter	Commander of the Fifth Army Corps; November 10, 1862 – November 16, 1862	Succeeded by Daniel Butterfield
Preceded by Ambrose Burnside	Commander of the Army of the Potomac; January 26, 1863 – June 28, 1863	Succeeded by George G. Meade
Preceded by Alexander M. McCook	Commander of the XX Corps; April 14, 1864 – July 28, 1864	Succeeded by Alpheus S. Williams
