= City Lore =

City Lore: the New York Center for Urban Culture was founded in 1986 and was the first organization in the United States devoted expressly to the "documentation, preservation, and presentation of urban folk culture." Their mission is to produce programs and publications that convey the richness of New York City—and America's—living cultural heritage. In addition to regular programming that includes the Place Matters Awards and the People's Hall of Fame, the organization works with a wide range of partners to develop exhibitions, publications, and documentary films, and to advocate for the rights of street performers, ethnic clubs, and other grassroots cultural expressions in New York City. City Lore works in four cultural domains: urban folklore and history, preservation, arts in education, and grassroots poetry traditions. Described by Sonnet Takahisa of the September 11th Memorial Museum as "wise renegades," their programs include People's Poetry Project, Place Matters (in collaboration with the Municipal Arts Society) and City of Memory.

City Lore works collaboratively with folk and community artists, embracing different aesthetics for the creation of art. Their collaborators include the Gotham Center for New York City History, the New-York Historical Society, Bank Street College of Education, and smaller groups such as Los Pleneros de la 21. City Lore’s staff consists of professional folklorists (Steve Zeitlin), the founder and executive director (Elena Martínez and Amanda Dargan), historians (Marci Reaven), photographers (Martha Cooper), ethnomusicologists (Lois Wilcken), and arts and education specialists (Anika Selhorst). Amanda Dargan and husband Steve Zeitlin are the parents of Oscar-nominated director Benh Zeitlin.

== Projects and programs ==
=== Urban folklore ===
The City Lore office on First Avenue on the Lower East Side houses archives containing over 100,000 images, hundreds of oral histories, and traditional music and poetry performance tapes. The archives are part of the ongoing documentation project featured on City of Memory, a participatory online story map of New York City.

City Lore's People's Hall of Fame, established in 1993, honors grassroots contributions to New York's cultural life and presents winners with a plate-sized bronze version of the New York City subway token. Recipients have included the Pearls of Wisdom Storytellers, Peter Benfaremo ("The Lemon Ice King of Corona"), Jim Power ("New York's Mosaic Man"), and Renee Flowers (original member of the Gowanus Wildcats Girls Drill Team).

=== People's Poetry Project ===
In the aftermath of September 11, 2001 attacks, City Lore found and collected anonymous poems and other writings that had been left at memorials, hospitals and gathering places throughout the city. A selection of these anonymous poems was published in the book, Words In Your Face: A Guided Tour Through Twenty Years of the New York City Poetry Slam. and appeared in Steve Zeitlin's essay, "Oh Did You See the Ashes Come Thickly Falling Down."

=== Special projects ===
City Lore produces documentary films and collaborates with filmmakers whose work relates to the organization's mission. Sponsored films include Ric Burns' Coney Island and the five-part series New York: A Documentary Film; City of Dreams, a film about female artists in New York City; From Mambo to Hip Hop, a documentary which traces the history of music in the South Bronx; and the forthcoming DeAf Jam, which highlights the poetry and storytelling of the deaf performed in American Sign Language.

Funds were raised by City Lore to support Peter Siegel's project to restore and issue tapes he made in the 1960s of folk music concerts by Mississippi John Hurt, The Carter Family, Jesse Fuller, Bill Monroe, and others. The recordings became the box set Friends of Old Time Music released by Smithsonian Folkways in 2006.

== See also ==
- Urban pop culture
