= Greater Gotham =

2017 non-fiction book by Mike Wallace

Greater Gotham: A History of New York City from 1898 to 1919
- Front cover
- Author: Mike Wallace
- Language: English
- Subject: History of New York City
- Publisher: Oxford University Press
- Publication date: 2017
- Publication place: United States
- Media type: Print
- Pages: 1196 pages
- ISBN: 9780195116359

Greater Gotham: A History of New York City from 1898 to 1919 is a 2017 non-fiction book by Mike Wallace. It is a general history of the city from the time of the consolidation of its five boroughs through the end of World War I. The book is the follow-up volume to the Pulitzer Prize-winning Gotham: A History of New York City to 1898, written by Wallace and Edwin G. Burrows. Though only slightly shorter than its predecessor, it covers significantly less time than the first volume due to the greater volume of published scholarship about the period and the improved ease of research due to the digitization of many archives.

The book is separated into five sections. He begins each with a global view of New York City's emerging power on an international scale, and gradually narrows to a microcosmic view of the city's individual residents and their daily lives. Wallace presents profiles of many New Yorkers, from the elite financiers attempting to reshape the city in their image, to the less fortunate denizens and those who advocated on their behalf.

Greater Gotham was generally well received by critics, many of whom felt the book matched the achievement of Wallace and Burrows' first volume. It was listed on The New York Times list of 100 notable books of 2017. Some critics wrote that Wallace skillfully synthesized a vast amount of source material into a single narrative, and suggested that he wrote well about individual people alongside macroeconomic concepts. Some felt that despite the book's considerable size, it lacked information on certain topics.

== Background ==
Wallace, a professor at John Jay College of Criminal Justice, began writing a history of American capitalism with fellow New York-based professor Edwin Burrows in the 1970s. The two men realized that their project's scope was too large, and so decided to focus solely on New York City. Burrows' research and writing centered on the 17th and 18th centuries, while Wallace took on the 19th and 20th. The restrictions of bookbinding technology necessitated the book's chronology ending in 1898, leading up to the consolidation of the five boroughs of New York. The resulting 1,424-page volume was the Pulitzer Prize-winning Gotham: A History of New York City to 1898, published in 1998.

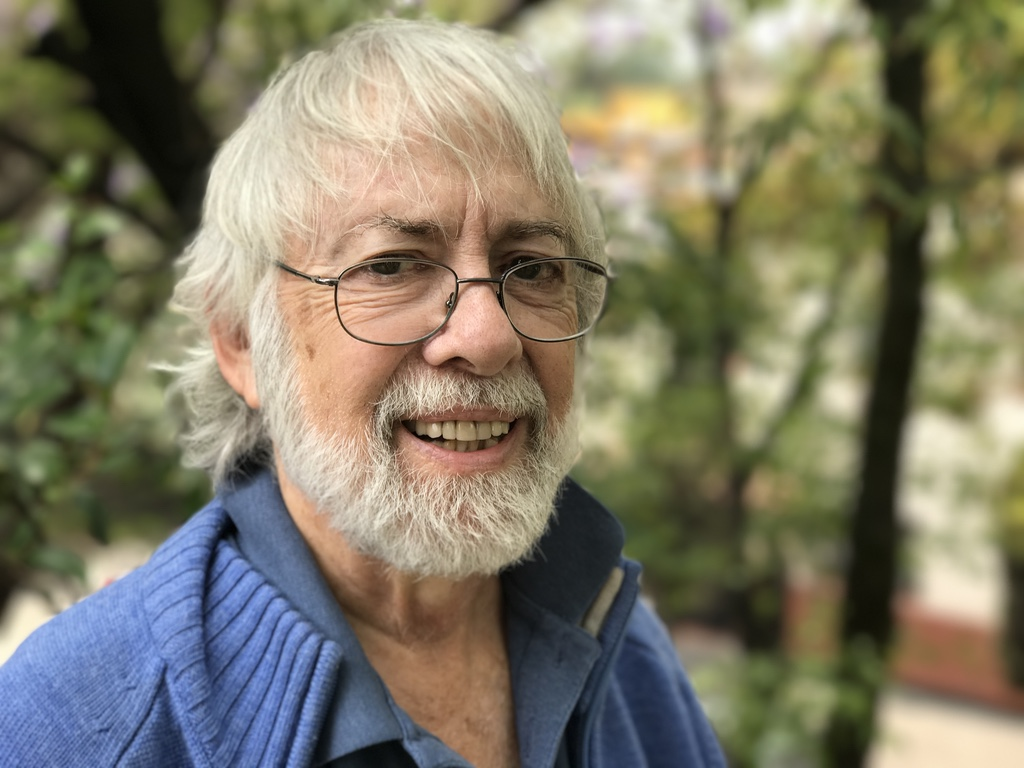
Wallace in 2017

Following Gotham's release, Wallace continued working on the project without Burrows, who died in 2018. Aided by the digitization of many primary documents, Wallace's research became easier and less expensive. This factor combined with an increase in scholarship published about early-20th century New York led Wallace to limit the scope of his second volume to 20 years of the city's history as opposed to the first book's 375 years. Wallace continued the first volume's approach of what he calls "radical history", which involves increased attention paid to groups of people who were often omitted from the narratives of established historians, including women, immigrants, and Black people. Wallace, who is married to the novelist Carmen Boullosa, attempted to use a novelist's approach of providing a comprehensive view of the time and place of his subject, while incorporating disparate fields of academic study, including military, political, and cultural, into an overarching narrative.

== Synopsis ==
Greater Gotham describes the two decades between the consolidation of New York City and the conclusion of World War I. The book is structured roughly chronologically, but Wallace arranges certain events thematically (J. P. Morgan's death, for instance, is not detailed alongside coverage of the Pujo Committee, as is often done by historians, due to Morgan's presence in Wallace's narrative hundreds of pages later in describing the establishment of the Metropolitan Opera and Museum). The titles of the book's five sections ("Consolidations and Contradictions", "Construction and Connection", "Cultures", "Confrontations", and "Wars") reflect those themes.

In each section, Wallace views the topics at hand through five lenses, for which he uses the metaphor of altitude. First, the "satellite" view: a global viewpoint that seeks to describe New York's place in the larger world, particularly in regards to its burgeoning economic influence. Second, the "jetliner" view: a more nation-centric view of the city's emergence as the country's de facto capital. Third, the "helicopter" view: a viewpoint examining trends and developments affecting the city's macroeconomy. Fourth, the "bird's eye" view: the capitalist cycle of boom and bust and the city's responses to these annual fluctuations and their effect on city life. Finally, the "ground level" view: a microcosmic examination of the city's people and the daily lives of the "innumerable varieties of Gothamites".

The beginning of Greater Gotham focuses largely on the consolidation of American companies through a series of acquisitions. New York-based capitalists like Morgan presided over the mergers of hundreds of companies into several firms such as U.S. Steel that dominated their respective sectors. These elite financiers sought to use the theories behind this consolidation to shape the city into their view of the ideal metropolis, and in so doing "reshape its borders, rationalize its transport and life-support systems, and remodel its cultural and political institutions".

Wallace describes the wide-ranging infrastructure improvements necessary for these businessmen to achieve their aims, including upgrades to the city's port, reduction of water pollution, and construction of the vast amount of housing needed for ever-increasing numbers of immigrants. He also details the technological advances that resulted in vertical growth via the skyscraper boom as well as the construction of the city's first subways. He addresses public health measures that saw the city's death rate cut in half between 1890 and 1914. The book covers the reaction to the capitalist reshaping of New York, which took the form of labor unions, muckraking journalism, socialist groups, suffragists, and more.

The two decades covered in the book saw the establishment or significant growth of many of the city's prominent cultural institutions. In addition to the establishment of the Metropolitan Opera and Art Museum, Wallace describes the expansion of the American Museum of Natural History, the New York Public Library, the Bronx Zoo, and the New York Philharmonic. Many of these institutions shared the same founders and sponsors, such as Morgan, August Belmont, Cornelius Vanderbilt, and Andrew Carnegie. The upper class's consolidation of the city's culture did not proceed at the quick pace of the capitalists' other initiatives due to the fact that they weren't as unified in their aims; those with "old money" tended not to mix with the nouveau riche, for instance.

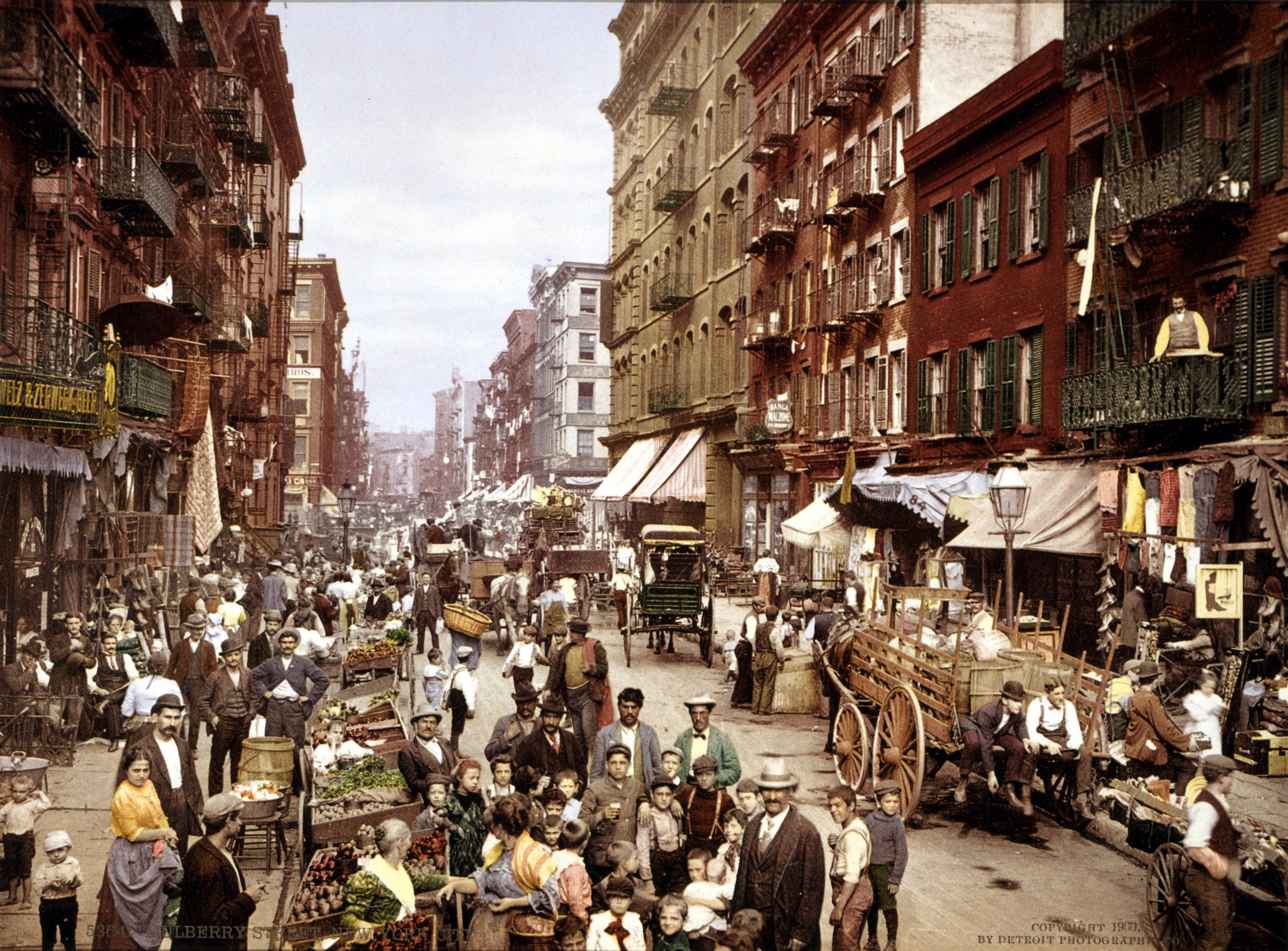
Manhattan's Little Italy c. 1900

Wallace focuses much of his narrative – including the majority of his "ground level" viewpoints – on individual New Yorkers, and not solely the elite businessmen. Included are the "progressives, repressives, radicals, [and] insurgents". He covers scores of people, a significant number of whom were women, many of whom struggled on behalf of the less affluent citizens of the city. He also tours the growing neighborhoods of the boroughs and writes what historian David Huyssen termed a "mosaic panorama" of each area's demographics.

Greater Gotham concludes with a section about New York's relation to World War I. Wallace describes how the city was divided on whether the United States should enter the conflict; the city's upper class, primarily English-speaking citizens, were generally in favor, while the multi-ethnic working classes were largely anti-war. Once the nation had joined the war, New York's identity as a melting pot of ethnicities was at odds with the wave of Christianity-infused patriotism that swept the country. Many radicals were repressed and their magazines and organizations shuttered. The Socialist Party of America, for example, was almost totally dismantled due to the repression alongside internal conflicts. Nationalism also rose amongst the large numbers of German and Irish immigrants in the city.

== Reception ==
Greater Gotham was listed on The New York Times list of 100 notable books of 2017. A number of critics believed that the book met or surpassed the standard set by the Pulitzer Prize-winning Gotham, including Glenn C. Altschuler of Reviews in American History and The New York Times's Joseph Berger. The reviewer for The Economist felt that it "more than does justice to its predecessor". Reviewers like Altschuler and David Huyssen in the journal American Nineteenth Century History emphasized Wallace's skill in synthesizing the vast amount of scholarship available.

Berger praised Wallace's ability to write just as capably at the level of "granular detail" as he does with a global viewpoint. He noted that many of the book's themes resonate in the present day, including police reform and anxiety about creating dependency on government aid. Richard Weigel of the The Daily News highlighted immigration as an issue a modern reader will recognize: "The ethnic groups have changed, but the problems they face are quite similar."

Many critics acknowledged that despite the book's size and amount of information, due to its breadth of scope it could not contain everything that everyone would want to find in it. Both Altschuler and Marion Casey of The American Historical Review felt that Wallace neglected the outer boroughs in telling a primarily Manhattan-forward history, and Casey added that the Catholic Church's effect on life in New York was minimized. In the Journal of Interdisciplinary History, Eric Hornberger decried the lack of coverage of the city's high culture as well as the lives of Germans in the metropolis.

In The American Scholar, Brooke Kroeger appreciated the fact that the book can be read from cover to cover like a traditional narrative or dipped in and out of like a reference almanac, though she was critical of its own abbreviated reference section. Hornberger also criticized Wallace's method of citation and what he considered to be an incomplete index. He did acknowledge that "it is a remarkable and serious book nonetheless, knowledgeable, diligent, and sometimes entertaining". Writing in the magazine Commentary, Fred Siegel was less complimentary. He was unimpressed with the "left-wing moralist" Wallace and considered his attacks on capitalism as biased, saying that Greater Gotham is "long on pages and short on insights".
