= Henry E. Sigerist =

Swiss medical historian (1891–1957)

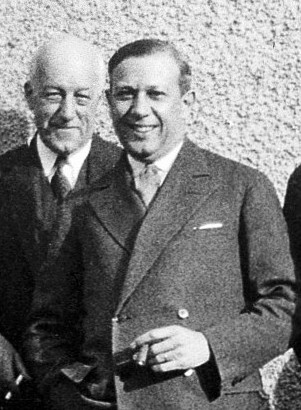
- Sigerist in 1929
- Born: Henry Ernest Sigerist; 7 April 1891; Paris, France
- Died: 17 March 1957 (aged 65); Switzerland
- Education: University of Zurich (M.D., 1917)
- Occupation: Medical historian
- Employer: Johns Hopkins University
- Known for: Advocacy for universal health care; historical writings on medicine
- Notable work: Socialized Medicine in the Soviet Union (1937); * History of Medicine

Henry Ernest Sigerist (7 April 1891 – 17 March 1957) was a Swiss medical historian and proponent of universal health care.

== Career ==
After graduating with an M.D. at the University of Zurich in 1917, Sigerist devoted himself to the study of the history of medicine. Socialized Medicine in the Soviet Union (1937), and History of Medicine were among his most important works. He emerged as a major spokesman for "compulsory health insurance". From 1932 to 1947 he was director at the Johns Hopkins University Institute of History of Medicine. He was elected to the American Philosophical Society in 1945 and the American Academy of Arts and Sciences in 1951. He received financial aid from the Rockefeller Institute. He attacked the American Medical Association because of its conflicting views on socialized medicine. Dr. Sigerist was influential in the creation of socialized medicine in Canada, and made four trips to Canada in the 1930s and 1940s at the invitation of various medical groups to speak on this topic. Under his influence, Saskatchewan, a Canadian province, introduced state-funded medical and hospital care for pensioners, people on welfare and cancer patients after being hired to write a report in 1944 by Tommy Douglas, the Premier of the province representing the Co-operative Commonwealth Federation. This was the basis for the eventual adoption of government-funded health care in all of Canada.

== Obituaries and influence ==
Sigerist was featured on the cover of the January 30, 1939 issue of Time Magazine.

Sigerist died in 1957. In 1999 an article in Hopkins Medical News described his view that "the entire history of medicine was spiraling toward one inevitable end: socialized medicine", and said that "he invested all his enthusiasm on the wrong horse — the Soviet Union".

An organization of medical historians have named themselves the Sigerist Circle, and books such as Making Medical History: The Life and Times of Henry E. Sigerist by Theodore M. Brown and Elizabeth Fee have begun to reintroduce Sigerist's legacy to the world. He was a mentor to Ilza Veith and Genevieve Miller, who were pioneering women as medical historians.

== See also ==
- Sigerist Society – English medical association
