= Linden Park (Queens) =

Public park in Queens, New York

Coordinates: 40°44′55″N 73°51′43″W

- Park of the Americas
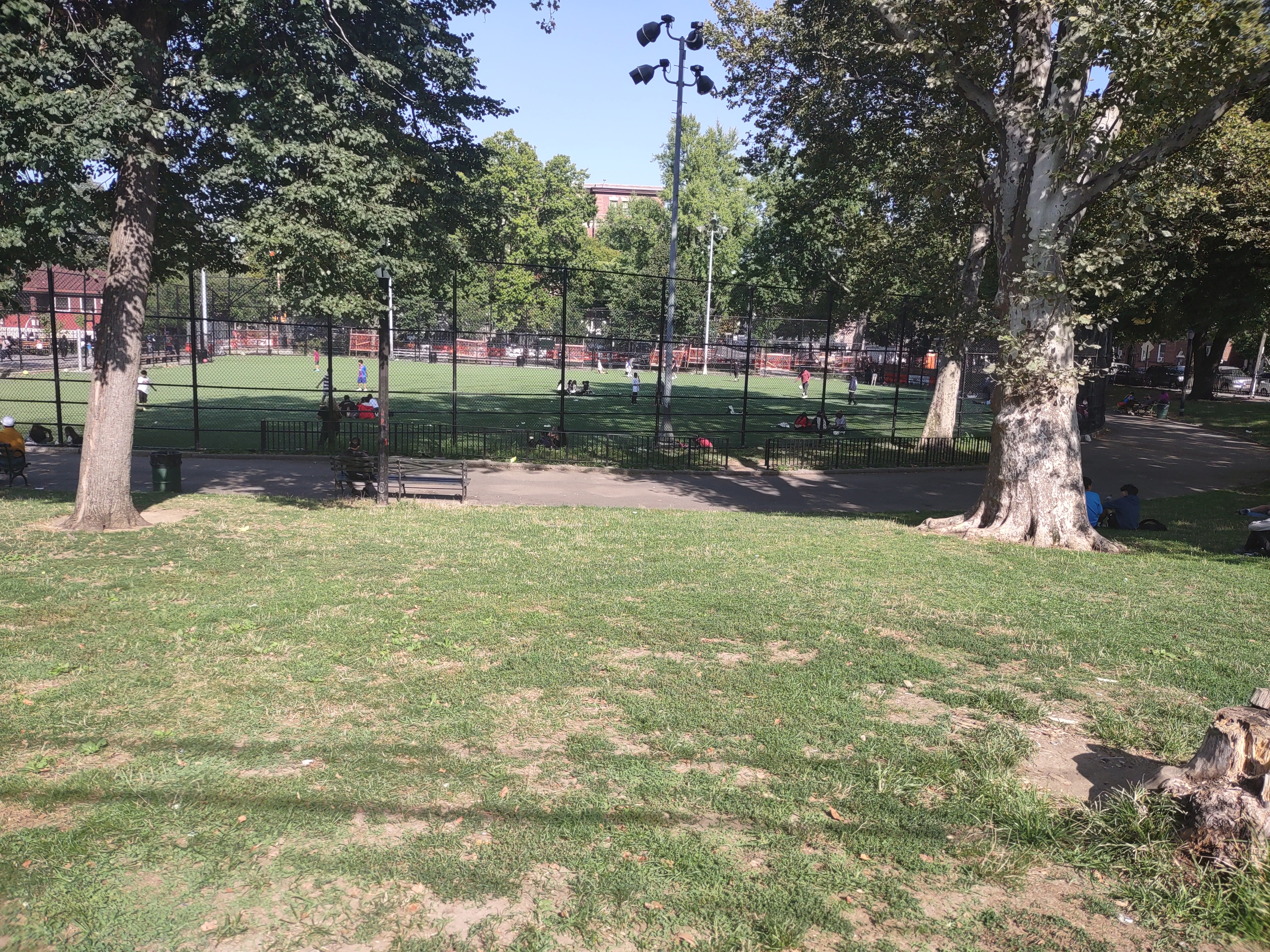
- Type: Park
- Location: New York City, U.S.
- Area: 3.08 acres (1.25 ha)
- Established: 1853
- Operator: New York City Department of Parks and Recreation
- Status: Open
- Website: www.nycgovparks.org/parks/park-of-the-americas

Linden Park, officially known as Park of the Americas, is a 3.08-acre (1.25 ha) park located in the center of the Corona neighborhood of Queens, New York City. It has stood out as a green square block on maps since the village of West Flushing was first mapped out in 1853, long before the village became the suburb or urban neighborhood known as Corona.

== History ==
The residents of Corona, known as West Flushing before 1872, often held events such as summer band concerts in this park. In 1893, a school was built across the street from the park, which was later designated as P.S.16. The event that turned Corona from a suburb into an urban neighborhood was the construction of the Interborough Rapid Transit Company's Flushing Line (now the New York City Subway's 7 and <7> trains) to 103rd Street–Corona Plaza station on April 21, 1917. To commemorate this event, local dignitaries and residents held a celebration that night in Linden Park with a concert.

The park's popular landmark and namesake was the natural, spring-fed Linden Lake, which was originally a watering hole for the village livestock. As the population grew, ice-skating became a popular winter activity. By the beginning of the 20th century, it was seen as a public health hazard. In 1912, the lake was drained for cleaning, the fish and turtles temporarily moved to other parks. All mud and stones were removed; the lake bottom was paved in concrete, and a fountain was installed in the center of the lake. The restored lake was only two feet (0.6 m) deep, to prevent drowning from skating on thin ice. Also that year, a memorial was erected in honor of Hugo E. Kruse, a local resident who was killed in the explosion of the USS Maine (ACR-1) in Havana, Cuba, which triggered the Spanish–American War. In 1917, the onset of World War I overshadowed memories of the Spanish–American War, and today, only a plaque under the park's flagpole remains to commemorate the American fighters killed in that war, including Kruse.

The growing use of Linden Park resulted in the final draining of Linden Lake in 1947. It was replaced with a playground, baseball field, and basketball courts, changing the scene of a village picnic ground into a sports and recreational theme.

During the city's financial deficit in the 1970s, vandalism, a flooded baseball field, unsafe playground, and homeless encampments all plagued this historic park. Linden Park was restored in 1997, with a new playground and exercise equipment, a restored flagpole, and the planting of small shrubs. In 2004, the baseball field received artificial turf. That year, the city councilman for Corona, Hiram Monserrate, requested to rename Linden Park as Park of the Americas, in recognition of the neighborhood's diversity of Latin American immigrants.
