= Mike Wallace (historian) =

American historian (1942–2026)

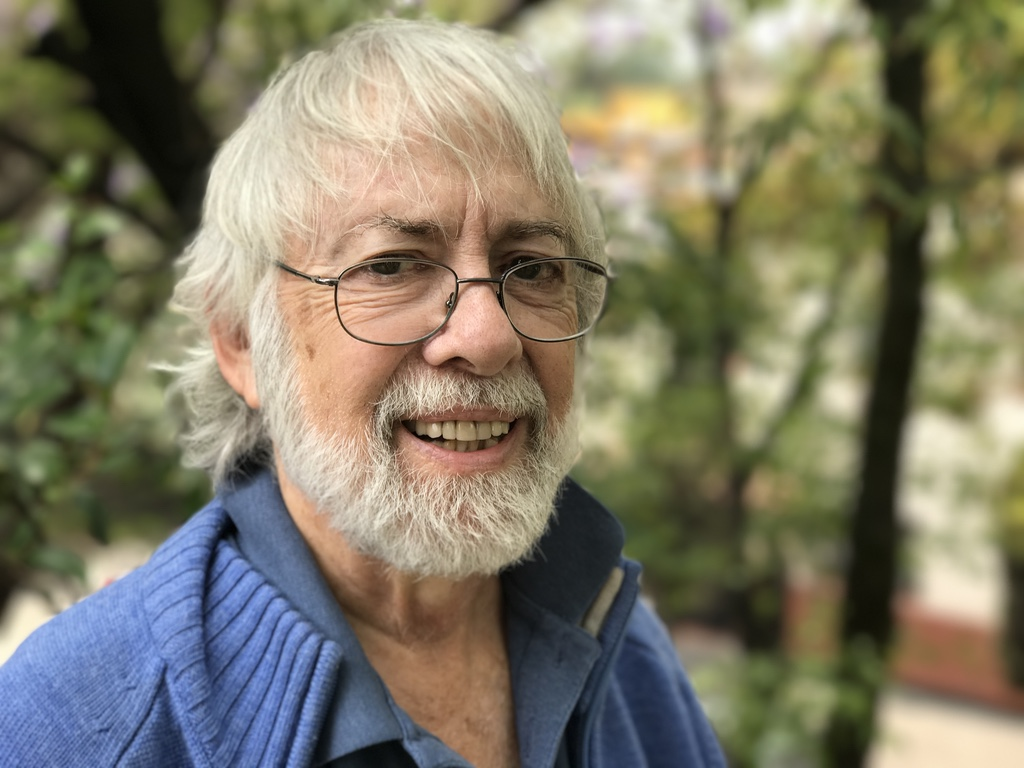
- Wallace in 2017
- Born: July 22, 1942; New York City, U.S.
- Died: July 5, 2026 (aged 83); Mexico City, Mexico
- Education: Columbia University (BA, PhD)
- Occupation: Historian
- Notable work: Gotham: A History of New York City to 1898 (co-author Edwin G. Burrows); Greater Gotham: A History of New York City from 1898 to 1919; Mickey Mouse History and Other Essays on American Memory
- Spouses: Nancy Greenough (m. 1969) Elizabeth Fee (m. 1973, divorced) Hope Cooke (m. 1987, divorced) Carmen Boullosa (m. 2004)
- Awards: Pulitzer Prize for History (1999)

Mike Wallace (July 22, 1942 – July 5, 2026) was an American historian who specialized in the history of New York City, and in the practice of "public history". In 1998, Wallace co-authored Gotham: A History of New York City to 1898, which won the Pulitzer Prize in History for 1999. In 2017, he published a successor volume, Greater Gotham: A History of New York City from 1898 to 1919, and in 2025 he published a third volume, Gotham at War: A History of New York City from 1933 to 1945. Wallace was a Distinguished Professor of History at John Jay College of Criminal Justice (City University of New York), and at the CUNY Graduate Center.

== Early life and education ==
Wallace was born in Queens on July 22, 1942. The family moved to San Francisco in 1943 and returned to New York in 1949. He grew up in Fresh Meadows, Queens, Valley Stream, and Great Neck.

He went to Columbia College in 1960. Upon graduating in 1964 he stayed on at Columbia University for graduate studies. With historian Richard Hofstadter as his adviser, his dissertation examined the emergence of the two-party system. He worked as Hofstadter's research assistant, and in 1968 had his first article accepted by the American Historical Review.

In 1968, Wallace took part in the student strike at Columbia University. In 1969, he and Hofstadter wrote a documentary history of violence in the United States.

== Career ==
In 1970, he taught for a year at Franconia College in New Hampshire. In 1971, Wallace accepted a teaching position at John Jay College of Criminal Justice. He recalled that after an article of his on violence in American history in The American Scholar had been criticized in a Wall Street Journal editorial, John Jay was eager to hire him.

In the early 1970s, Wallace began working with other historians of his generation who were "broadening the scope of American history by adding the voices of those previously excluded, such as women, blacks and the working class." In 1973, Wallace helped launch, and for the next ten years directed, the Radical History Forum. He also participated in transforming the Radical Historians' Newsletter, started in 1973, into the Radical History Review, by 1975, and then served as its editorial coordinator.

During the 1980s, Wallace wrote essays about the ways history gets presented – or misrepresented – to the general public, outside of schools and universities. In 1996, these pieces were collected in a book called Mickey Mouse History and Other Essays on American Memory.

In 1998, he co-authored (with Edwin G. Burrows) Gotham: A History of New York City to 1898, which in 1999 won the Pulitzer Prize in History.

In 2000, Wallace founded the Gotham Center for New York City History, a non-profit organization. It is part of the Graduate Center of the City University of New York.

The successor volume, Greater Gotham: A History of New York City from 1898 to 1919, was published on October 2, 2017. The third volume, Gotham at War: A History of New York City from 1933 to 1945 was published on October 1, 2025.

== Personal life and death ==
Wallace was married to Mexican author and playwright Carmen Boullosa. He had previously been married in December 1969 to Nancy Greenough, in May 1973 to Elizabeth Fee, and in October 1987 to historian and former Queen of Sikkim, Hope Cooke.

Wallace died from complications of Lewy body dementia in Mexico City on July 5, 2026, at the age of 83.
