= Urban pop culture =

Popular culture from cities and towns

Urban pop culture is the pop culture of cities and towns. The term was created by Abdel Russell in 2010, when he used it to describe his pilot tv show MVBtv, as Urban Pop Culture tv. It is both driven by and drives the popular culture of mainstream media. Urban pop culture tends to be more cosmopolitan and liberal than mainstream culture, but is not without its own complex mores, reflecting, for example, the parent societies' ambivalence to sexuality.

== Impact on popular media ==
The impact of traditional popular media is more evident today than it has ever been. Since 1995, the number of nationally aired television commercials and popular sitcoms that use props, references, or slang from Inner cities continues to grow. Big screen movies are also other examples of how urban pop culture is impacting traditional pop culture. The hit movie Tropic Thunder is filled with references, images, and jokes that are common amongst the youth in Brooklyn, New York City and Los Angeles, California. Urban pop culture has also infiltrated the mainstream world of fashion, music, and even politics. During an interview former president George W. Bush was asked how he felt about a comment rapper Kanye West made about his administration's response efforts to Hurricane Katrina, and the former president included in his response that he was "not a hater"; a term that originated in New York City, and that is used mostly by rappers and youth.

== Impact of hip-hop ==
Urban pop culture is now glorified and well-known as hip-hop. The Bronx neighborhood of New York City was the birthplace of early hip-hop music in the 1970s. It began as a cooperative effort by intersecting Black, Latino, and Caribbean American youth groups during block parties, which were neighborhood events where DJs played soul and funk music. Traces back to traditional African American styles of music, Motown, and funk.

== Impact on fashion ==
The urban pop culture and hip hop scene have had a considerable effect on the world of fashion. Traditionally, hip hop and urban fashion culture were sidelined by major fashion houses and did not qualify as luxury fashion. However, as the result of collaborations between artists and luxury brands like the collaboration between ASAP Rocky and Dior, streetwear became a means for historically marginalized designers to access the world of luxury fashion.

== International influence ==
=== Korea ===
In recent years, the rise of Korean pop culture has increased drastically. Formerly known as K-pop, is influenced by mainstream hip-hop culture, reggae, and soul styles of music. K-pop artists are seen collaborating with large hip-hop influencers such as Nicki Minaj and SNOOP DOGG. The K-pop identity intersects with the American Urban identity. There is a rise in fashion trends that are commonly found in urban areas within the United States. Hairstyles and dancing are included as well.

=== Latin America ===
Within Latin America, the use of Afrobeats and hip hop styles that are found commonly within urban areas of the United States and inner cities is becoming more popularized. Modern reggaeton intersects with modern rap and hip hop. The embracing of traditional features within oneself is also something that has become more popularized within Latin America.

== See also ==
- City Lore
- Urban contemporary music

== Sources ==
- Burt Glinn. 2001. JAPAN. Tokyo, 1984. Harajuku dance groups imitating American rock and roll on main street of neighbourhood closed only for dancing on Sundays.. https://library-artstor-org.eznvcc.vccs.edu/asset/AMAGNUMIG_10311516909.
- Bush, Barbara. “African Echoes, Modern Fusions: Caribbean Music, Identity and Resistance in the African Diaspora.” Music Reference Services Quarterly, vol. 10, no. 1, Mar. 2006, p. 17. EBSCOhost, https://doi-org.eznvcc.vccs.edu/10.1300/J116v10n01_02.
- Durman, Chris. “Cultural Codes: Makings of a Black Music Philosophy: An Interpretive History from Spirituals to Hip Hop by William C. Banfield.” Music Reference Services Quarterly, vol. 14, no. 1/2, Mar. 2011, pp. 68–70. EBSCOhost, https://doi-org.eznvcc.vccs.edu/10.1080/10588167.2011.570207.
- KIM, SUK-YOUNG. “The Many Faces of K-Pop Music Videos: Revues, Motown, and Broadway in ‘Twinkle.’” Journal of Popular Culture, vol. 49, no. 1, Feb. 2016, pp. 136–54. EBSCOhost, https://doi-org.eznvcc.vccs.edu/10.1111/jpcu.12382.
- Nikos Economopoulos. JAPAN. 1996. JAPAN. Tokyo. Harajuku. Teenagers queuing to buy tickets for a rock concert. 1996.. 1996. Artstor, library-artstor-org.eznvcc.vccs.edu/asset/AMAGNUMIG_10311541436
