= The Lemon Ice King of Corona =

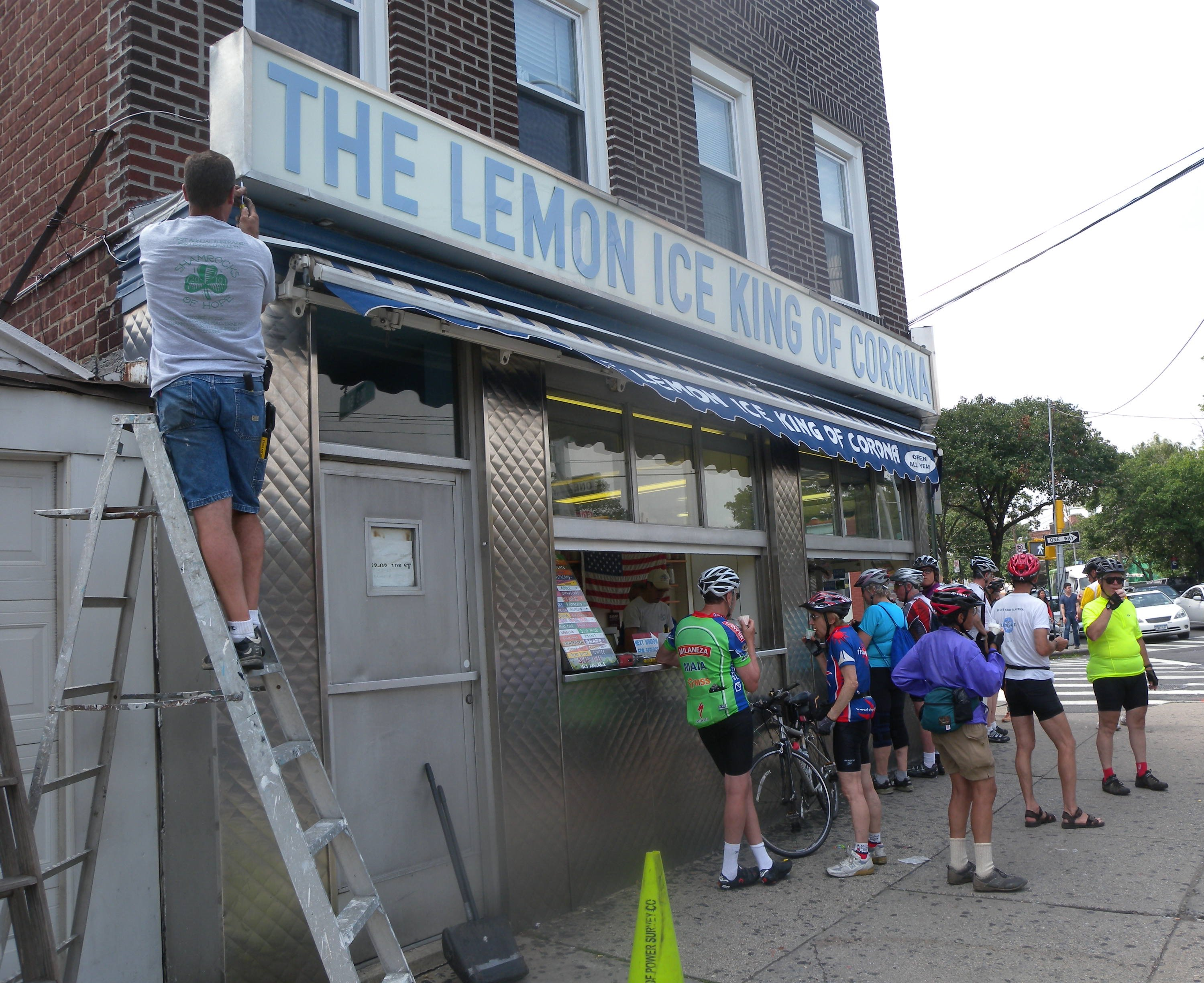
- Interactive map of The Lemon Ice King of Corona

Restaurant information
- Established: 1944
- Owner: Michael Zampino
- Previous owners: Nicola and Peter Benfaremo
- Food type: Italian ice
- Location: 52-02 108th St, Corona, New York, 11368
- Coordinates: 40.7432°N 73.8551°W

The Lemon Ice King of Corona is an Italian ice shop located in Corona, Queens. Founded in 1944 by Nicola Benfaremo out of a garage, it is a long-standing business considered a neighborhood institution, and gained international fame for its appearance in the opening credits of the sitcom The King of Queens. While believed to be one of the first places to serve Italian ice, the creation of the dessert was traced back even earlier to Di Cosmo's Italian Ice in Elizabeth, New Jersey, which was founded in 1915. The ices served by them are made in-house and have a creamy, semi-solid texture despite the lack of any dairy ingredients, achieved by small-batch churning.

== History ==
The shop was founded by Nicola Benfaremo in 1944, and inherited by Peter Benfaremo, the "Lemon Ice King", who partnered with his father to open a storefront in 1964 to coincide with the New York World's Fair. It was later sold to former production worker Michael Zampino, while Peter Benfaremo continued working there until his death in 2008. It became popular with German tourists due to its The King of Queens appearance. The shop serves more than three dozen flavors, including some sugar-free flavors, with peanut butter ices being one of the most popular, and also serve candy apples in the winter months.
