= Elizabeth Fee =

Irish-American medical historian (1946–2018)

Dr Elizabeth Fee
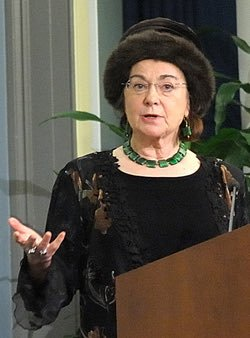
- Born: December 11, 1946; Belfast, Northern Ireland
- Died: October 17, 2018 (aged 71); Bethesda, Maryland, US
- Education: University of Cambridge and Princeton University
- Occupations: Historian of medicine and public health
- Employer(s): National Library of Medicine, Johns Hopkins School of Public Health and State University of New York
- Spouse: Mary Garafolo (m. 2005)

Elizabeth Fee (December 11, 1946 – October 17, 2018), also known as Liz Fee, was a historian of science, medicine and health. She was the Chief of the United States National Library of Medicine History of Medicine Division.

== Early life and education ==
Fee was born in Belfast to Deirdre and John Fee, Methodist missionaries. From the age of five months, she began travelling with her parents to destinations including China, Malaysia, India, Egypt and throughout Europe. After contracting scarlet fever in China, Fee lost her hearing in one ear. In her teen years, the family returned to Northern Ireland where Fee attended school.

Fee studied biology at the University of Cambridge and received a First. In 1968, she was awarded a Fulbright scholarship and went to study with Thomas Kuhn at Princeton University. She was awarded two master's degrees and obtained a PhD in the history and philosophy of science in 1978. Her dissertation, based on Victorian periodicals, was titled "Science and the 'Woman Question,' 1860–1920".

== Career ==
Fee taught history of science and medicine at the State University of New York and introduced controversial courses on human sexuality.

In 1974, Fee went to work at Johns Hopkins School of Public Health, where she worked until 1995. She worked in departments including health humanities, international health, and health policy.

Fee was involved in the feminist movement and the Health Marxist Organisation. In 1994, she coedited Women's Health, Politics, and Power: Essays on Sex/Gender, Medicine, and Public Health with Nancy Krieger.

She became particularly well known for her work to document and analyse the history of HIV/AIDS. Historian Theodore M. Brown has said that Fee sought "to make sure that vulnerable people do not have their needs and rights trampled in the rush to 'protect the public.'" She coedited AIDS: The Burden of History in 1988 and AIDS: The Making of a Chronic Disease in 1992 with Daniel Fox. Her work informed scholarship on lesbian, gay, bisexual, transgender and queer health and wellbeing.

Fee produced almost thirty books and hundreds of articles, on topics as varied as the racialized treatment of syphilis, the history of the toothbrush, and bioterrorism. During her tenure at Johns Hopkins, Fee wrote a history of the School of Public Health, Disease and Discovery: A History of the Johns Hopkins School of Hygiene and Public Health, 1916–1939. This is considered the first "biography" of the first school of public health, and it documented power networks in a supposedly technocratic field. Later, she and Roy Acheson wrote a history of public health education.

In 1990, Fee became the editor of the history section of the American Journal of Public Health (AJPH).

In the 1990s, she started the Sigerist Circle, which examined class, race and gender, and the Spirit of 1848 Caucus of the American Public Health Association, which sought to improve the understanding of how identity influences public health.

Fee became the Chief of the History of Medicine Division at the National Library of Medicine in 1995. She oversaw moves to restructure the organisation around three sections: Rare Books and Early Manuscripts, Images and Archives, and Exhibitions. In the 2000s, she became one of the leaders of Global Health Histories, a group created by the Rockefeller Foundation and the World Health Organization to analyse 20th-century public health initiatives. This resulted in the book The World Health Organization: A History, written with Marcos Cueto and Theodore M. Brown. She was appointed Chief Historian of the National Library of Medicine in 2011.

Shortly before her 2018 death, Fee retired to become an independent researcher.

== Awards ==
Fee received the following awards:

- Kellog fellowship - W. K. Kellogg Foundation
- Fulbright fellowship
- Regents Award - National Library of Medicine
- Arthur Viseltear Award - American Public Health Association

National Council on Public History

== Personal life ==
Fee met her wife, Mary Garafolo, in the 1980s when Fee was based at Johns Hopkins. They married in Vancouver in 2005.

== Death and legacy ==
Fee died due to complications of amyotrophic lateral sclerosis on October 17, 2018, in Bethesda.

The June issue of APJH featured eight articles marking Fee's influence on the field of the history of public health.
