= Theodore M. Brown =

American medical and public health historian

Theodore M. Brown is a professor of public health and policy, medical humanities and history at the University of Rochester. His area of research is the history of health policy in America and he specializes in the intellectual, institutional, and political histories of medicine.

Brown received his B.S. in history and science from the City College of New York in 1963, and went on to complete a Ph.D. in the history and philosophy of science from Princeton University in 1968. He also pursued a post-doctoral fellowship at Johns Hopkins University in the history of medicine in 1969. He currently serves as a contributing editor to the American Journal of Public Health, and as the editor of the Rochester Studies of Medical History. Brown is the co-author of three books on the topic of health care, and his most recent book The Quest for Health Reform: A Satirical History received attention for its use of political cartoons to illustrate the history and struggles associated with health reform in America. In 2013, Brown was appointed the Charles E. and Dale L. Phelps Professor of Public Health and Policy at the University of Rochester. He is currently working on a synthetic history of the World Health Organization.

== See also ==
- Henry E. Sigerist

== Selected works ==
- Benjamin, Georges C, Brown, Theodore M, Ladwig, Susan, Berkman, Elyse. The Quest for Health Reform: A Satirical History. Washington, DC: American Public Health Association, 2013.
- Birn, Anne-Emanuelle and Brown, Theodore M Comrades in Health: US Internationalists at Home and Abroad. New Jersey: Rutgers University Press, 2013.
- Fee, Elizabeth and Brown, Theodore M, Making Medical History: The Life and Times of Henry E. Sigerist. Baltimore: Johns Hopkins University Press, 1997.
- Brown, Theodore M (2013) "Putting Roe v Wade into Perspective." American Journal of Public Health 103.3, page 393.
- Brown, Theodore M and Cueto, Marcos (2011) "The WHO in the World of Global Health," in Richard Parker and Marni Sommers (eds.), Handbook of Global Health. London: Routledge, 2011, pages 18–30.
- Brown, Theodore M and Fee, Elizabeth (2006) "Rudolf Carl Virchow: Medical Scientist, Social Reformer, Role Model." American Journal of Public Health 96.11, pages 2102–2105.
