= Stephen W. Sears =

American historian (born 1932)

Stephen Ward Sears (born July 27, 1932) is an American historian specializing in the American Civil War.

== Early life and education ==
Sears is a graduate of Oberlin College.

== Career ==
As an author, he has concentrated on the military history of the American Civil War, primarily the battles and leaders of the Army of the Potomac.

He was employed as editor of the Educational Department at the American Heritage Publishing Company.

== Personal life ==
Sears resides in Connecticut.

== Bibliography ==
- Air War Against Hitler's Germany, American Heritage Publishing Company, Harper & Row, 1964; I Books, 2005, ISBN 0743493303
- Desert War in North Africa, American Heritage Publishing Company, Harper & Row, 1967; I Books, 2006, ISBN 1596873019
- The American Heritage history of the automobile in America, Simon & Schuster, 1977, ISBN 0671229869
- Landscape Turned Red: The Battle of Antietam, Houghton Mifflin, 1983.
- George B. McClellan: The Young Napoleon, Ticknor & Fields, NY, 1988.
- The Civil War Papers of George B. McClellan: Selected Correspondence, 1860–1865, Ticknor & Fields, New York (edited by Sears, 1989), ISBN 0395663601
- To the Gates of Richmond: The Peninsula Campaign, Ticknor & Fields, New York, New York, 1992.
- Chancellorsville, Houghton Mifflin, 1996.
- Controversies & Commanders: Dispatches from the Army of the Potomac, Houghton Mifflin, 1999.
- Gettysburg, Houghton Mifflin, 2003. ISBN 0395867614
- Lincoln's Lieutenants: the High Command of the Army of the Potomac, Houghton Mifflin, 2017. ISBN 9780618428250
