= Gotham: A History of New York City to 1898 =

1998 book by Mike Wallace and Edwin G. Burrows

- First edition cover
- Author: Mike Wallace; Edwin G. Burrows
- Audio read by: Victor Bevine
- Language: English
- Subject: History of New York City, New Amsterdam
- Genre: Non-fiction, history
- Publisher: Oxford University Press
- Publication date: 1998 (print) 2018 (audiobook)
- Publication place: United States
- Media type: Print (hardcover), audiobook
- Pages: 1416 pp.
- ISBN: 978-0-19-511634-2
- OCLC: 37903500

Gotham: A History of New York City to 1898 is a non-fiction book by historians Edwin G. Burrows and Mike Wallace. Based on over twenty years of research, it was published in 1998 by Oxford University Press and won the 1999 Pulitzer Prize for History, and detailed the history of the city before the consolidation of the five boroughs in 1898.

== Reception ==
In his review for The Atlantic, Timothy J. Gilfoyle called the book "the most comprehensive examination to date of the city's history prior to 1900," saying that "Gotham may rank in importance with the multi-volume works on Thomas Jefferson by Dumas Malone and on the Civil War by Allan Nevins," while Clyde Haberman in The New York Times wrote that "Burrows and Wallace offer a large-canvas portrait of a city they clearly love.... [I]t marches relentlessly across the nearly three centuries from the Dutch landing to the emergence of the unified boroughs. The countless topics include, to list but a few, New York's wars with the Indians and its pro-Crown leanings, its financial support for the slave trade and its bloody draft riots during the Civil War, the commercial imperatives and the waves of immigration that constantly redefined it." Publishers Weekly called the work "definitive."

== Subsequent volumes ==
A follow-up volume, Greater Gotham: A History of New York City from 1898 to 1919, written by Wallace, was published in 2017 and covered New York City history for the following 20 years. Initial plans were to have the second volume's timeline go through World War II, but due to the amount of material, a third volume was announced, initially covering the period from 1920 until 1945. However, because of health issues and vastness of the time period, Wallace wrote the third volume to only cover the period of World War II, skipping the 1920s and the early 1930s. Gotham at War: A History of New York City from 1933 to 1945 was published in 2025, the final volume in this series written by Wallace.

== Naming ==
"Gotham" as a term for New York City was coined by Washington Irving in an 1807 November issue of his literary magazine, Salmagundi, based on the legends of the English village of Gotham, whose inhabitants are known for their folly.

== Journal reviews ==
- Bender, Thomas (Spring 2000). "Reviewed Work: Gotham: A History of New York City to 1898, Edwin G. Burrows, Mike Wallace". The Journal of Interdisciplinary History. 30 (4): 699–700. doi:10.1162/jinh.2000.30.4.699. JSTOR 206768. S2CID 142770290.
- Chase, Jeanne (June 1999). "Reviewed Work: Gotham". Reviews in American History. 27 (2): 180–187. doi:10.1353/rah.1999.0028. JSTOR 30031048. S2CID 201761860.
- Edgell, Derek (October 2001). "Reviewed Work: Gotham: A History of New York City to 1898, Edwin G. Burrows, Mike Wallace". History. 86 (284): 539–540. JSTOR 24425550.
- Godfrey, Brian J. (January 2002). "Tragedy and Transformation in New York City". Geographical Review. 92 (1): 127–139. doi:10.2307/4140959. JSTOR 4140959.
- Hammack, David C. (April 2000). "Reviewed Work: Gotham: A History of New York City to 1898, Edwin G. Burrows, Mike Wallace". The American Historical Review. 105 (2): 536–537. doi:10.2307/1571496. JSTOR 1571496.
- Leopold, John A. (Spring 2000). "Reviewed Work: Gotham: A History of New York City to 1898, Edwin Burrows, Mike Wallace". The Historian. 62 (3): 646–647. JSTOR 24450348.
- Mendel, Ronald (December 2001). "Reviewed Work: Gotham: A History of New York City to 1898, Edwin G. Burrows, Mike Wallace". Urban History. 28 (3): 438–439. JSTOR 44613268.
- Schwartz, Joel (July 1999). "Reviewed Work: American Metropolis: A History of New York City, George J. Lankevich; Gotham: A History of New York City to 1898, Edwin G. Burrows, Mike Wallace". New York History. 80 (3): 338–341. JSTOR 23182369.
- Spann, Edward K. (September 1999). "Reviewed Work: American Metropolis: A History of New York City, George J. Lankevich; Gotham: A History of New York City to 1898, Edwin G. Burrows, Mike Wallace". The Journal of American History. 86 (2: Rethinking History and the Nation-State: Mexico and the United States as a Case Study: A Special Issue): 751–752. doi:10.2307/2567072. JSTOR 2567072.
- Wills, Karen (February 2000). "Reviewed Work: Gotham: A History of New York City to 1898, Edwin G. Burrows, Mike Wallace". The Economic History Review. 53 (1): 203. JSTOR 2599496.

Preceded by Summer for the Gods	Pulitzer Prize for History; 1999	Succeeded by Freedom from Fear
