= Edwin G. Burrows =

American historian (1943–2018)

Edwin Gwynne "Ted" Burrows (May 15, 1943 – May 4, 2018) was a Distinguished Professor of History at Brooklyn College. He is the co-author of the Pulitzer Prize-winning Gotham: A History of New York City to 1898 (1998), and author of Forgotten Patriots: The Untold Story of American Prisoners During the Revolutionary War, (2008), which won the 2009 Fraunces Tavern Museum Book Award.

Burrows completed a BA at University of Michigan in 1964, and a PhD from Columbia University in 1973, where he studied under Eric McKitrick. The same year, he began teaching at Brooklyn College, where his course on the History of New York City was one of the college's most popular offerings. He married M. Patricia Adamski in 1978 and they resided in Northport, New York on Long Island. Burrows died at the age of 74 in May 2018.
