= List of parks in New York City =

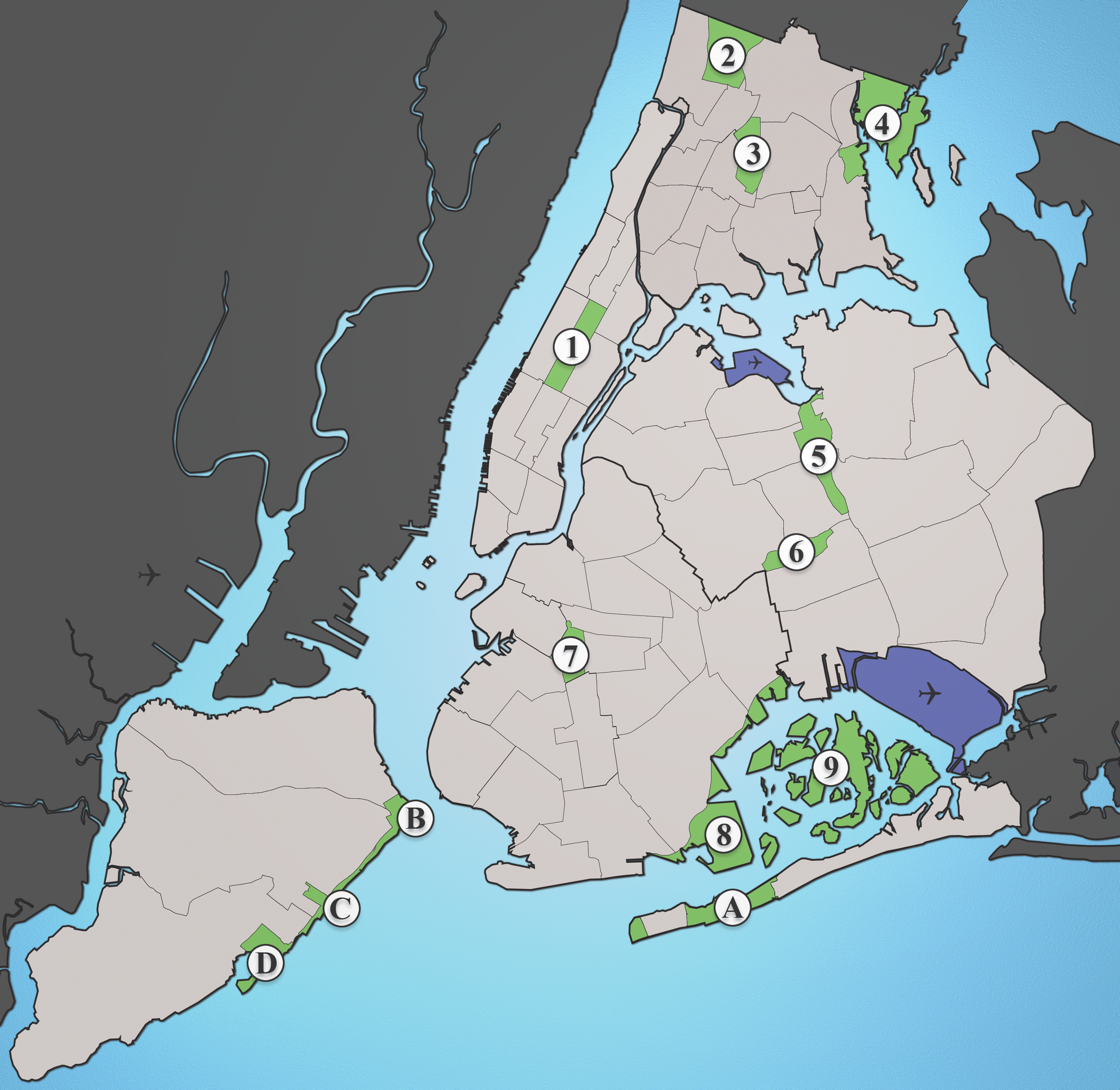
A map showing major greenspaces in New York City: 1) Central Park, 2) Van Cortlandt Park, 3) Bronx Park, 4) Pelham Bay Park, 5) Flushing Meadows Park, 6) Forest Park, 7) Prospect Park, 8) Floyd Bennett Field, 9) Jamaica Bay, A) Jacob Riis Park and Fort Tilden, B) Fort Wadsworth, C) Miller Field, D) Great Kills Park

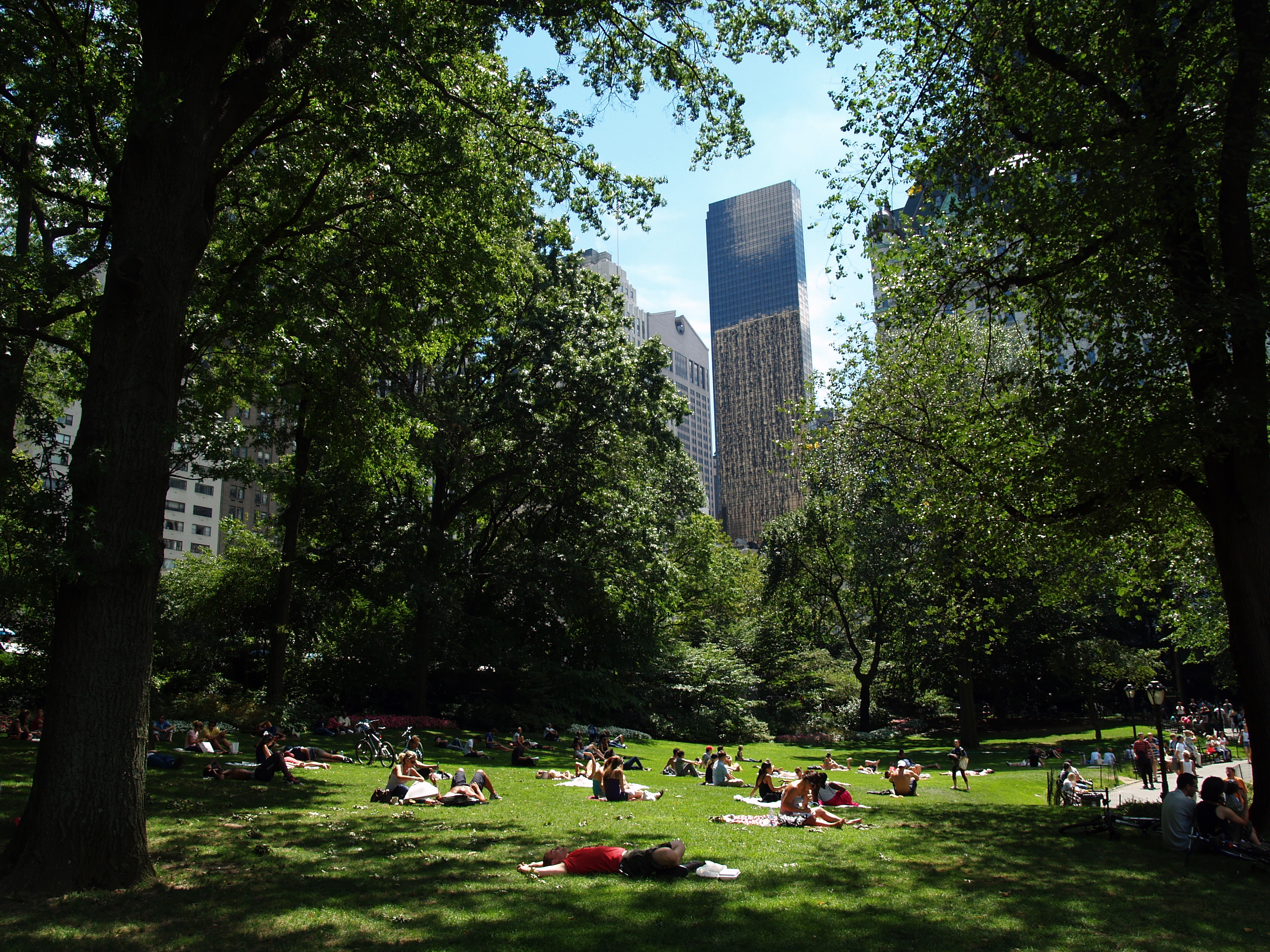
Central Park is the most visited urban park in the United States.

This is a list of parks in New York City. Three entities manage parks within New York City, each with its own responsibilities:

- Federal – US National Park Service (NPS) - both open-space and historic properties
- State – New York State Office of Parks, Recreation and Historic Preservation (NYSP)
- Municipal – New York City Department of Parks and Recreation (DPR)

The city has 28,000 acres (113 km^{2}) of municipal parkland and 14 miles (22 km) of public municipal beaches. Major municipal parks include Central Park, Prospect Park, Flushing Meadows-Corona Park, and Forest Park. The largest is Pelham Bay Park, followed by the Staten Island Greenbelt and Van Cortlandt Park. There are also many smaller but historically significant parks in New York City, such as Battery Park, Bryant Park, Madison Square Park, Union Square Park, and Washington Square Park.

Additionally, some parks, most notably Gramercy Park, are privately owned and managed. Access to these private parks might be restricted.

The City Parks Foundation offers more than 1200 free performing arts events in parks across the city each year, including Central Park Summerstage, the Charlie Parker Jazz Festival and dance, theater, and children's arts festivals.

== Top ten parks by area ==
1. Pelham Bay Park, Bronx - 2,772 acres (11.22 km^{2})
2. Greenbelt, Staten Island - 2,316 acres (9.37 km^{2})
3. Freshkills Park, Staten Island - 2,200 acres (8.9 km^{2})
4. Van Cortlandt Park, Bronx - 1,146 acres (4.64 km^{2})
5. Flushing Meadows-Corona Park, Queens - 897 acres (3.63 km^{2})
6. Central Park, Manhattan - 843 acres (3.41 km^{2})
7. Marine Park, Brooklyn - 798 acres (3.23 km^{2})
8. Bronx Park, Bronx - 718 acres (2.91 km^{2})
9. Alley Pond Park, Queens - 655 acres (2.65 km^{2})
10. Forest Park, Queens - 544 acres (2.20 km^{2})

While Jamaica Bay Wildlife Refuge is larger than any of the parks listed, at 9,155 acres (37.05 km^{2}), it is not ranked since it is a wildlife refuge and not an active-use park.

== List of parks by borough ==
The New York City Department of Parks and Recreation maintains a complete list of all parks.

=== The Bronx ===
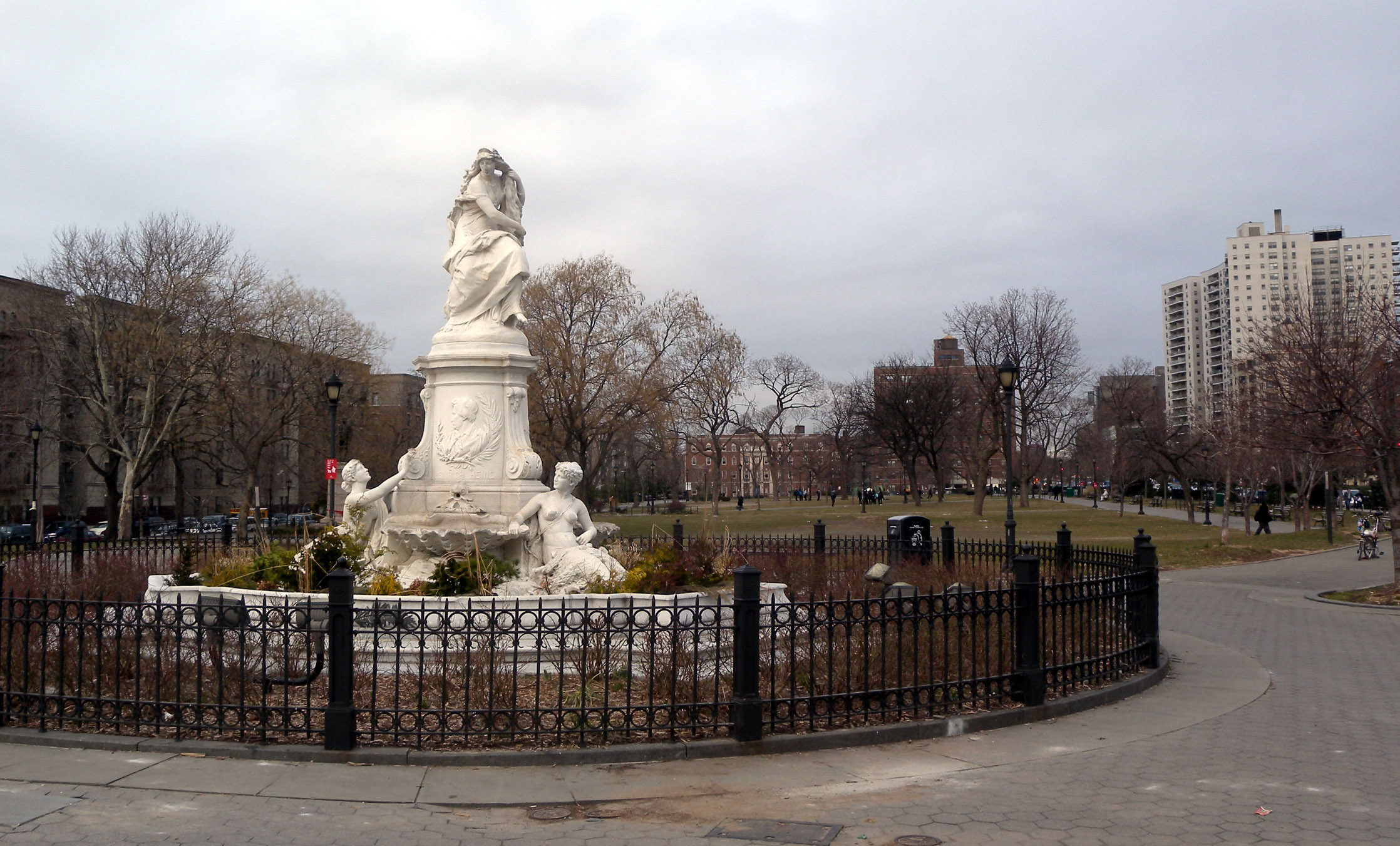
Joyce Kilmer Park

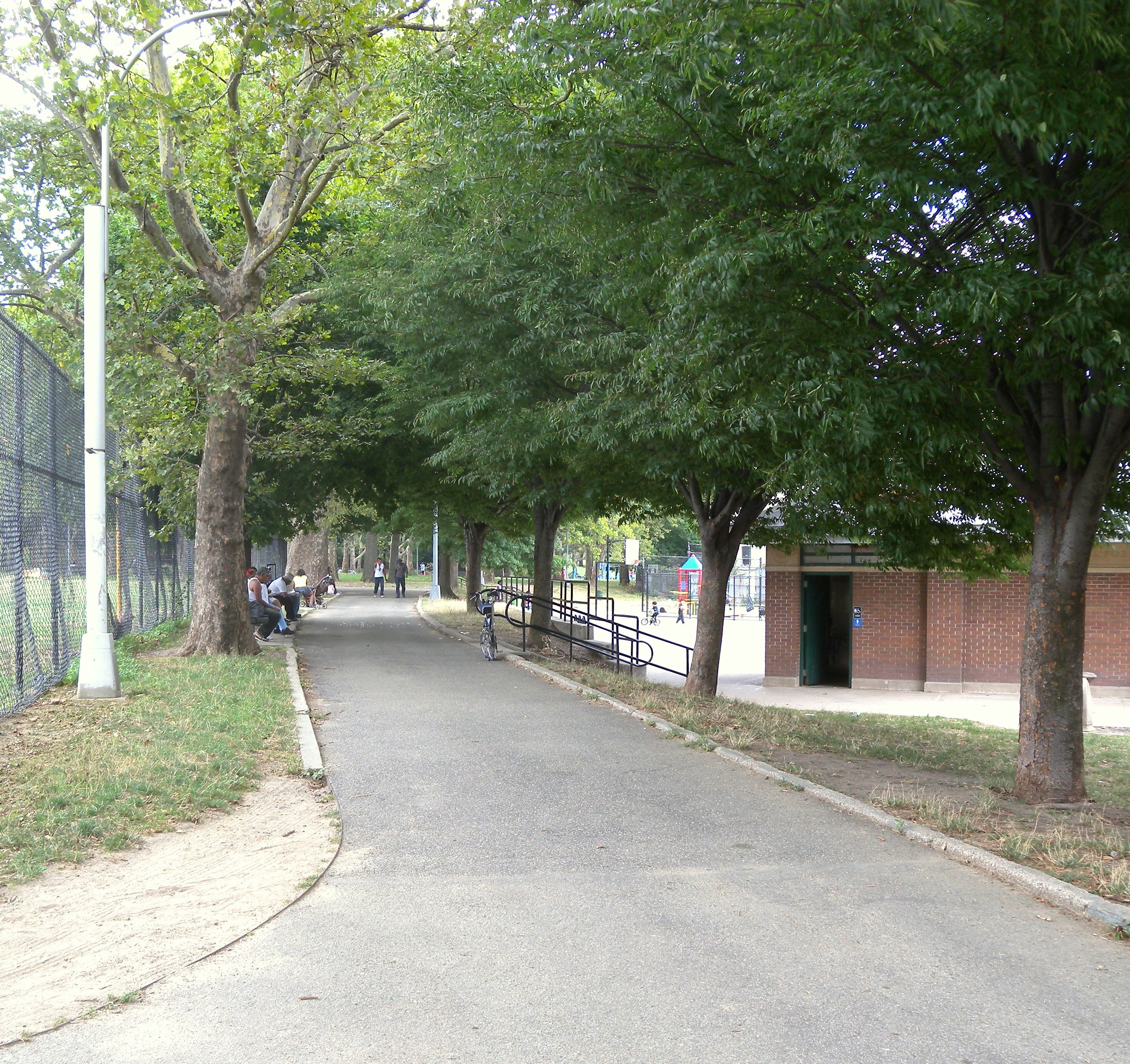
St Mary's Park

- Bronx Park
  - New York Botanical Garden
  - Bronx Zoo
  - Bronx / Allerton Skate Park
- Starlight Park

==== East Bronx ====
- Agnes Haywood Playground*
- Allerton Playground
- Ambrosini Field
- Bicentennial Veterans Memorial Park
- Castle Hill Park
- Ferry Point Park
- Givans Creek Woods
- Haffen Park
- Harding Park
- Pelham Bay Park
  - Orchard Beach
  - Rodman's Neck
- Pugsley Creek Park
- Richman Park
- Seton Falls Park
- Seton Park
- Soundview Park

==== West Bronx ====
- Aqueduct Walk
- Bridge Park
- Devoe Park
- Ewen Park
- Harris Park
- Henry Hudson Park
- Jerome Park
- Poe Park, including Edgar Allan Poe Cottage
- Raoul Wallenberg Forest
- Riverdale Park
- Spuyten Duyvil Shorefront Park
- St. James Park
- University Woods
- Van Cortlandt Park
- Vidalia Park
- Vinmont Veteran Park
- Washington's Walk
- Wave Hill
- Williamsbridge Oval

==== South Bronx ====
A sub-section of West Bronx.

- A. Badillo Community Rose Garden and Park
- Abigail Playground
- Admiral Farragut Playground
- Alexander's Alley
- Arcilla Playground*
- Barretto Point Park
- Bill Rainey Park
- Claremont Park
- Concrete Plant Park
- Crotona Park
- Estella Diggs Park
- Grant Park
- Hunts Point Riverside Park
- Joseph Rodman Drake Park
- Joyce Kilmer Park
- Julio Carballo Fields
- Julius Richman Park
- Macombs Dam Park
- Mill Pond Park
- Mullaly Park
- Playground 52
- Printer's Park
- Pulaski Park
- Roberto Clemente State Park (NYSP)
- St. Mary's Park
- Tremont Park

=== Brooklyn ===
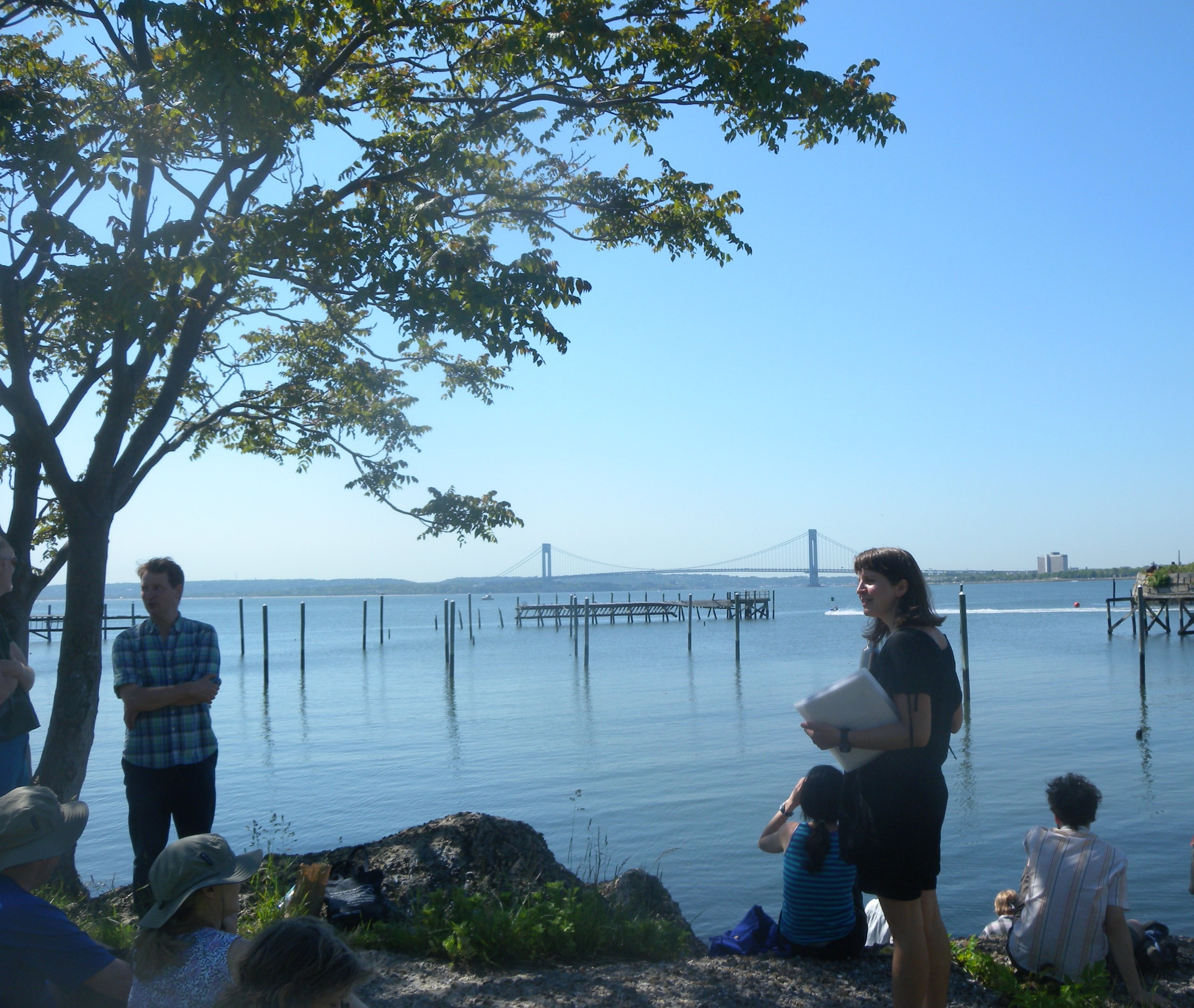
Calvert Vaux Park

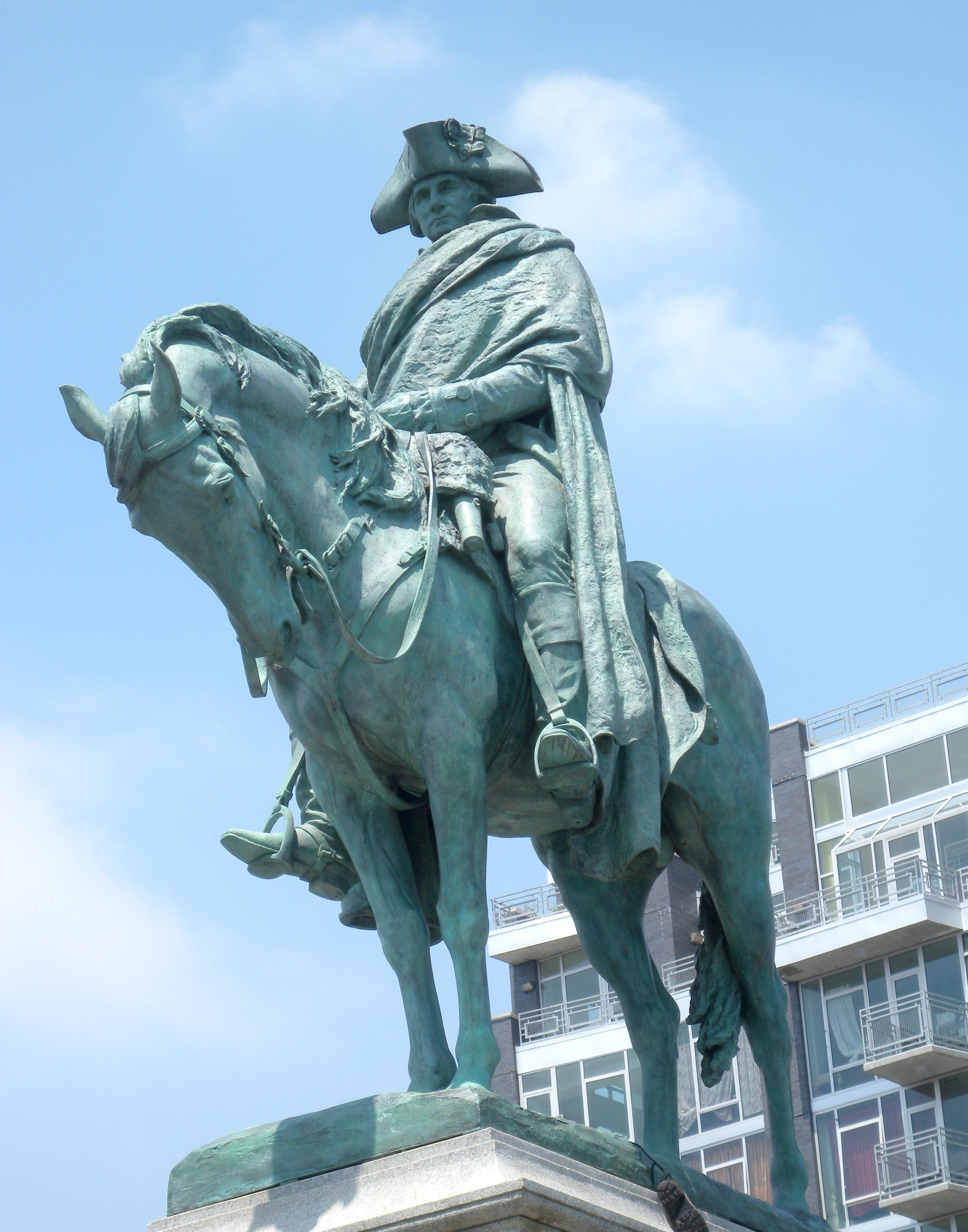
Continental Army Plaza

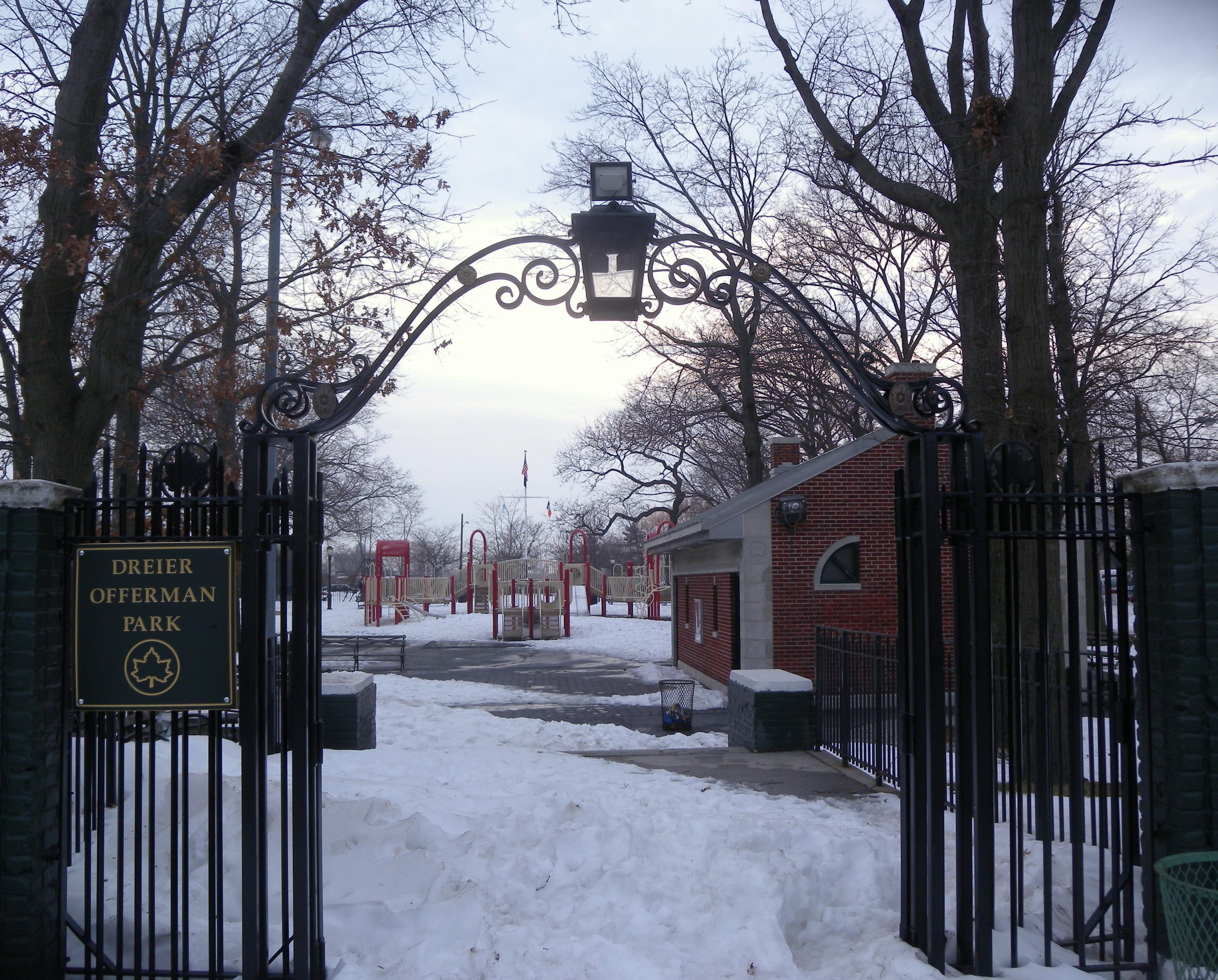
Dreier-Offerman Park

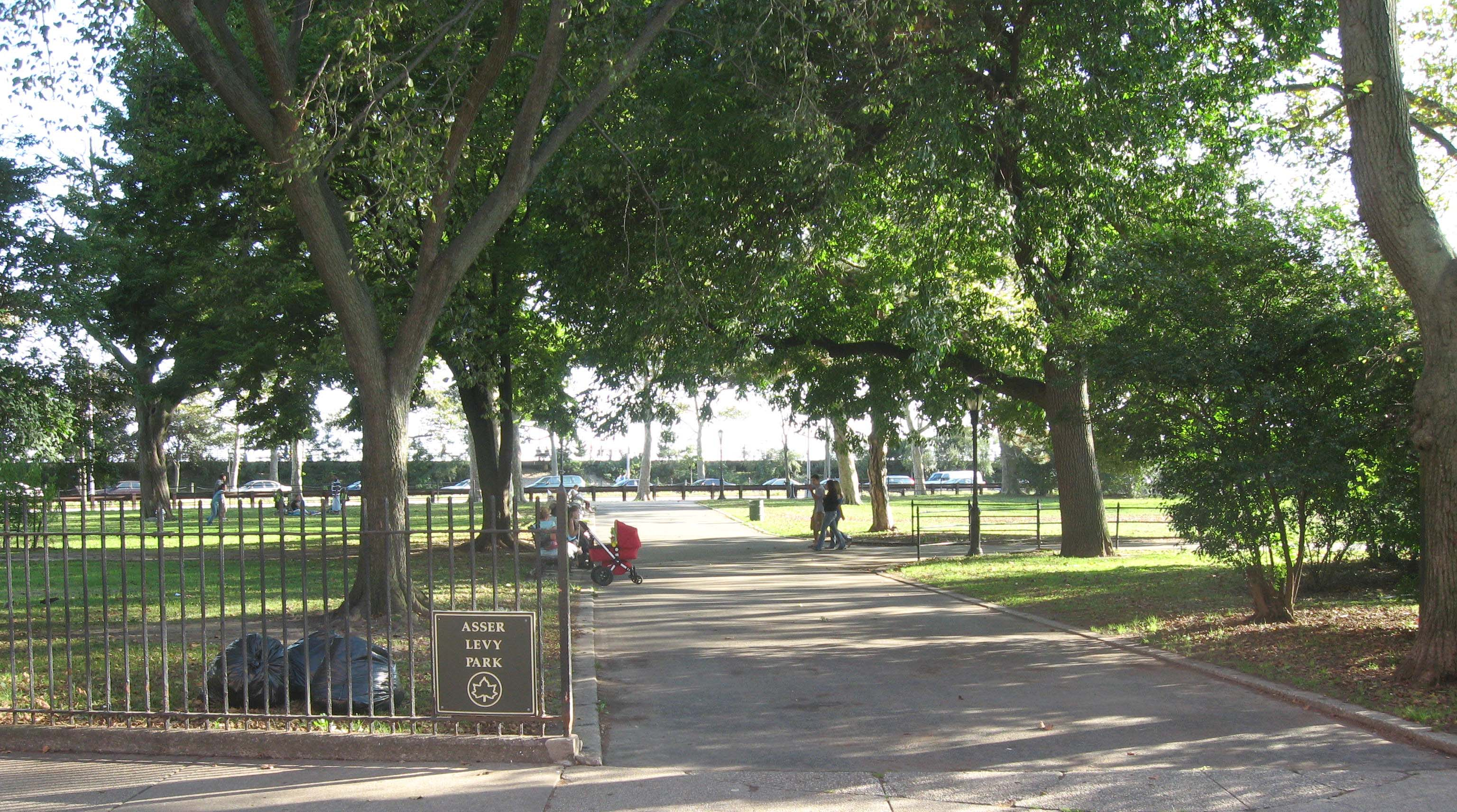
Seaside - Asser Levy park

- 100% Playground
- Adam Yauch Park
- Admiral Triangle
- Aimee Triangle
- Alben Square
- Albermarle Playground
- Albert Lysander Parham Playground
- American Playground
- Amersfort Park
- American Veterans Memorial Pier
- Amersfort Park
- Andries Playground
- Anthony Chiarantano Park
- Arbor Place (Brooklyn)
- Asser Levy Park
- Avenue R Mall
- Badame Sessa Memorial Square
- Banneker Playground
- Bar and Grill Park
- Bartel-Pritchard Square
- Bartlett Playground
- Bath Beach Park
- Bath Playground
- Bayview Playground
- Beattie Square
- Beaver Noll Park
- Bedford Playground
- Belmont Playground
- Benson Playground
- Bergen Beach Playground
- Berry Playground
- Berriman Playground
- Betsy Head Park
- Betty Carter Park
- Bensonhurst Park
- Bildersee Playground
- Bill Brown Memorial Playground
- Boerum Park
- Boulevard Grove (Brooklyn)
- Boyland Park (Brooklyn)
- Breukelen Ballfields Park
- Brevoort Playground
- Brighton Beach Park
- Brighton Playground
- Brooklyn Anchorage Plaza
- Brooklyn Bears Rockwell Plaza Garden
- Brooklyn Botanic Garden
- Brooklyn Bridge Park
- Brooklyn Heights Promenade
- Brooklyn–Queens Greenway
- Brooklyn Waterfront Greenway
- Brower Park
- Brownsville I Ura Park
- Brownsville Playground
- Bush Terminal Park
- Bushwick Fields
- Bushwick Inlet Park
- Bushwick Playground
- Butterfly Gardens (Brooklyn)
- Cadman Plaza
- Calvert Vaux Park
- Campiz Playground
- Canarsie Park
- Callahan-Kelly Playground
- Carroll Park
- Century Playground
- Captain John McKenna IV Park
- Captain Oakley Junior Square
- Carroll Park
- Carver Playground
- Charlie's Place
- Chester Playground
- Chiarantano Playground
- City Line Park
- Classon Playground
- Classon Triangle
- Clumber Corner
- Cobble Hill Park
- Coffey Park
- Cohn Triangle
- Colonel David Marcus Memorial Playground
- Columbus Park
- Commodore Barry Park
- Cough Triangle
- Coney Island Beach & Boardwalk
- Coney Island Creek Park
- Conners Square
- Continental Army Plaza
- Cooper Park (Brooklyn)
- Corporal Wiltshire Triangle
- Cosmo Barone Triangle
- Crispus Attucks Playground
- Cuite Park
- Curtis Park
- Cutinella Triangle
- Cuyler Park
- Cypress Hills Playground
- Dahill Triangle
- David A Fox Playground
- David Ruggles Playground
- De Diego Playground
- Dean Playground
- Decatur Playground
- DeKalb Playground
- Detective Joseph Mayrose Park
- DiGilio Playground
- Dimattina Playground
- Dodger Playground
- Domino Park
- Dr. Ronald McNair Park
- Duke Park
- Dyker Beach Park
- Dyker Heights Playground
- Dyker Beach Park and Golf Course
- East Fourth Street Garden
- Eastern Park
- Edmonds Playground
- El-Shabazz Playground
- Eleanor Roosevelt Playground
- Elijah Stroud Playground
- Elton Playground
- Ennis Park
- Epiphany Playground
- Ericsson Playground
- Ethan Allen Playground
- Eugenio Maria De Hostos Playground
- Evergreen Playground
- Father Giorgio Triangle
- Father Popieluszko Square
- Fermi Playground
- Fidelity Memorial Park
- Fidler-Wyckoff House Park
- Fish Playground
- Floyd Patterson Field
- Floyd Bennett Field (NPS - Gateway National Recreation Area)
- Fort Greene Park
- Fort Hamilton Park
- Fort Hamilton Plaza
- Fraser Square
- Freedom Square
- Four Sparrow Marsh
- Fresh Creek Nature Preserve
- Friends Field
- Fulton Park
- Galapo Playground
- Garden of Union
- Garden Playground
- Garibaldi Playground
- Garibaldi Square
- Gateway Triangle
- George Walker Junior Playground
- Georgia Avenue Garden
- Gethsemane Garden (Brooklyn)
- Glenwood Playground
- Golconda Playground
- Goodwin Gardens
- Gowanus Greenway
- Gowanus Playground
- Grace Playground
- Grady Playground
- Grand Ferry Park
- Grant Gore Triangle
- Gravesend Park
- Gravesend Square
- Green Central Knoll
- Greenwood Playground
- Hancock Playground
- Harmony Park
- Harmony Triangle
- Harry Chapin Playground
- Harry Maze Memorial Park
- Hattie Carthan Garden
- Hattie Carthan Playground
- Hawthorne Field
- Heckscher Playground (Brooklyn)
- Herbert Von King Park
- Heffernan Square
- Heisser Triangle
- Highland Park
- Hillside Park
- Holy Name Square
- Homecrest Playground
- Hot Spot Tot Lot
- Houston Playground
- Howard Playground
- Hull Street Garden
- Human Compass Garden
- Institute Park (Brooklyn)
- Irving Square Park
- Israel Putnam Playground
- Jackie Robinson Park (Brooklyn) - Bedstuy
- Jackie Robinson Park Playground - Crown Heights
- Jacob Joffe Park
- Jacob's Ladder Playground
- Jefferson Field
- Jerome Playground
- Jesse And Charles Dome Playground
- Jesse Owens Playground
- J.J. Byrne Park
- John D'Emic Senior Memorial Park
- John J. Carty Park
- John Paul Jones Park
- Kaiser Park
- Kelly Park
- Kennedy-King Playground
- KeySpan Park
- Kosciuszko Pool
- Lady Moody Triangle
- Lafayette Gardens Playground
- Lafayette Playground
- Lafayette Playground
- Leif Ericson Park 7 Square
- Lentol Garden
- Lentol Triangle
- Lieutenant Joseph Petrosino Park
- Lieutenant William E Coffey Square
- Lincoln Terrace Park
- Linden Park
- Lindower Park
- Lindsay Triangle
- Linwood Playground
- Lion's Pride Playground
- Lithuania Square
- Livonia Playground
- Lott Park
- Louis Valentino Junior Park
- Lowry Triangle
- Lt. Federico Narvaez Tot Lot
- Macri Triangle
- Manhattan Beach Park
- Marc And Jason's Playground
- Marcy Green Center
- Marcy Green North
- Marcy Green South
- Maria Hernandez Park
- Marine Park
- Marion-Hopkinson Playground
- Marlboro Playground
- Marsha P. Johnson State Park (NYSP)
- Martin Luther Playground
- Martin Luther King Jr. Playground aka Linton Park
- Martinez Playground
- McCarren Park
- McDonald Playground
- McDonald Square
- McDonald Triangle
- McGolrick Park
- McKinley Park
- Mcguire Fields
- McLaughlin Park
- Mellett Playground
- Memorial Gore
- Meucci Square
- Middleton Playground
- Milestone Park
- Monastery Square
- Monsignor Crawford Field
- Monsignor McGolrick Park
- Mother Cabrini Park
- Mount Carmel Square
- Mount Prospect Park
- Narrows Botanical Gardens
- Nautilus Playground
- Nehemiah Park
- Newport Playground
- Newton Barge Terminal Playground
- Nicholas A Brizzi Playground
- North Pacific Playground
- Nostrand Playground
- Ocean Hill Playground
- Onehundred Percent Playground
- Oracle Playground
- Orient Grove
- Owl's Head Park
- Oxport Playground
- Pacific Playground
- Paerdegat Basin Park
- Paerdegat Park
- Parade Ground (Flatbush, Brooklyn)
- Park Slope Playground
- Parkside Playground
- Payne Park (Brooklyn)
- Penn Triangle
- Person Square
- Pierrepont Playground
- Pigeon Plaza
- Pink Playground
- Playground Three Forty
- Police Officer Reinaldo Salgado Playground
- Powell Playground
- Power Playground
- Pratt Playground
- Private First Class Thomas Norton Memorial Playground
- Private Sonsire Triangle
- Prospect Park
- Public School 1 Playground
- Public School 125 Playground
- Public School 4 Paradise Garden
- Quaker Parrot Park at the Dust Bowl
- Rachel Haber Cohen Playground
- Railroad Playground
- Rainbow Playground
- Ramirez Playground
- Red Hook Park
- Remsen Playground
- Right Triangle Playground
- Robert E. Venable Park
- Roberto Clemente Ballfield
- Rodney Park Center
- Rodney Park North
- Rodney Park South
- Rodney Playground Center
- Rodney Playground North
- Rodney Playground South
- Roebling Playground
- Rolf Henry Playground
- Russell Pederson Playground
- Saint Andrews Playground
- St. Johns Park
- Saint Nicholas-Olive Street Garden
- Saint Nicholas-Powers Street Garden
- Sam Leggio Triangle
- Samuel Goldberg Triangle
- Saratoga Park
- Saratoga Ballfields
- Sarsfield Playground
- Scarangella Park
- Schenk Playground
- Seeley Park
- Sergeant Joyce Kilmer Triangle
- Sergeant William Dougherty Playground
- Seth Low Playground
- Sheepshead Playground
- Shirley Chisholm State Park (NYSP)
- Shore Park and Parkway
- Sid Luckman Field
- Sixteen Trees Triangle
- Sledge Playground
- Slope Park
- Sobel Green
- Sperandeo Brothers Playground
- Spring Creek Park
- Stephen A Rudd Playground
- Sternberg Park
- Steuben Playground
- Stockton Playground
- Stuyvesant Park
- Success Garden
- Sumner Playground
- Sunset Park
- Taaffe Playground
- Ten Eyck Plaza
- Terrapin Playground
- The Amazing Garden
- Thomas Greene Playground
- Tiger Playground
- Tilden Playground
- Todd Memorial Square
- Trinity Park
- Trust Triangle
- Umma Park
- Under The Tracks Playground
- Underwood Park
- University Plaza
- Van Dyke Playground
- Van Voorhees Park
- Vincent V Abate Playground
- Walt Whitman Park
- Washington Park
- Washington Hall Park
- Washington Plaza (Brooklyn)
- Weeksville Playground
- Weinburg Triangle
- West Playground
- Whitman Park (Brooklyn)
- William Sunners Playground
- Willoughby Playground
- Wilson Playground
- Wingate Park
- WNYC Transmitter Park
- Woodruff Playground
- Zion Triangle

=== Manhattan ===
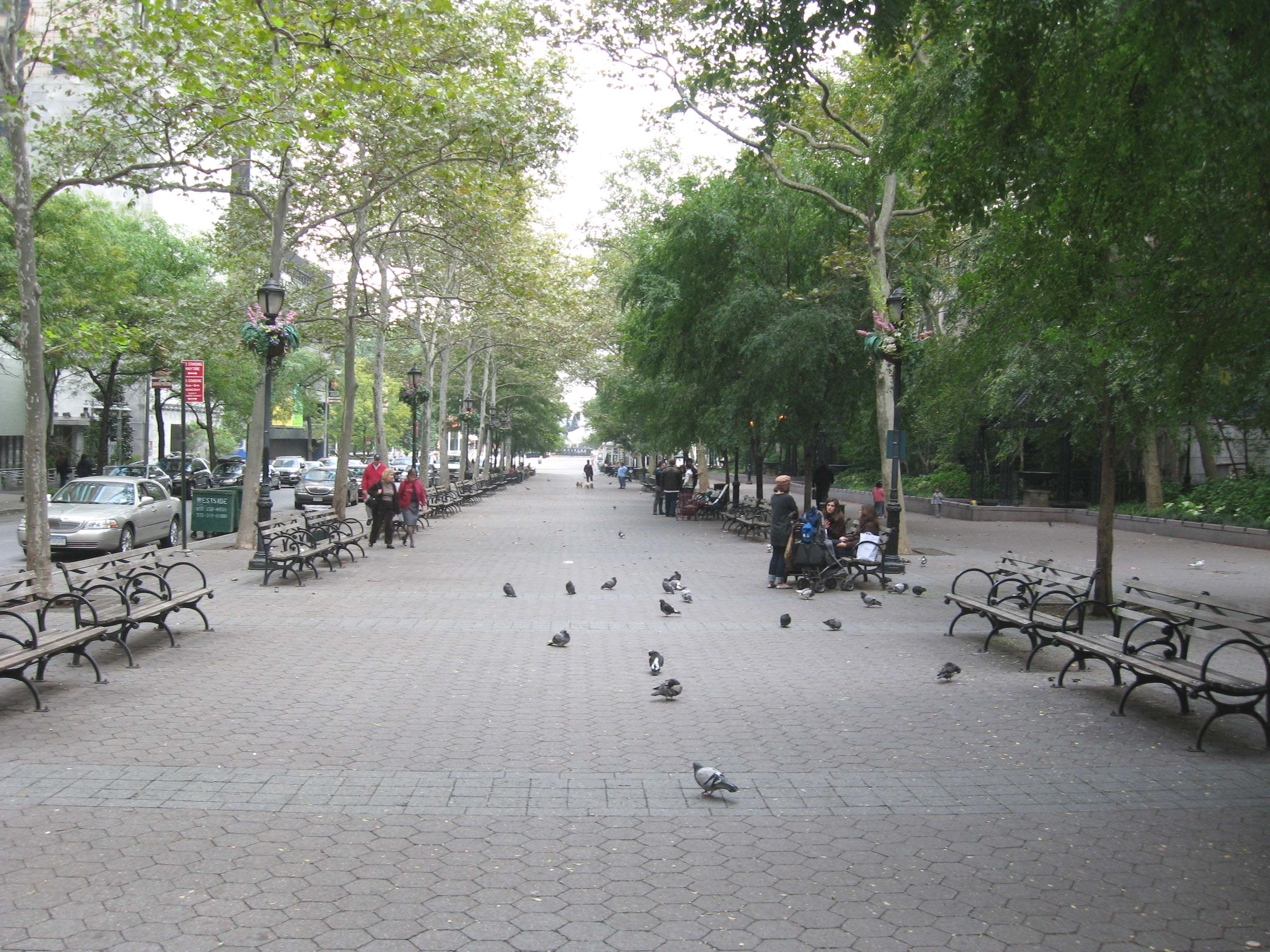
Dag Hammarskjöld Plaza

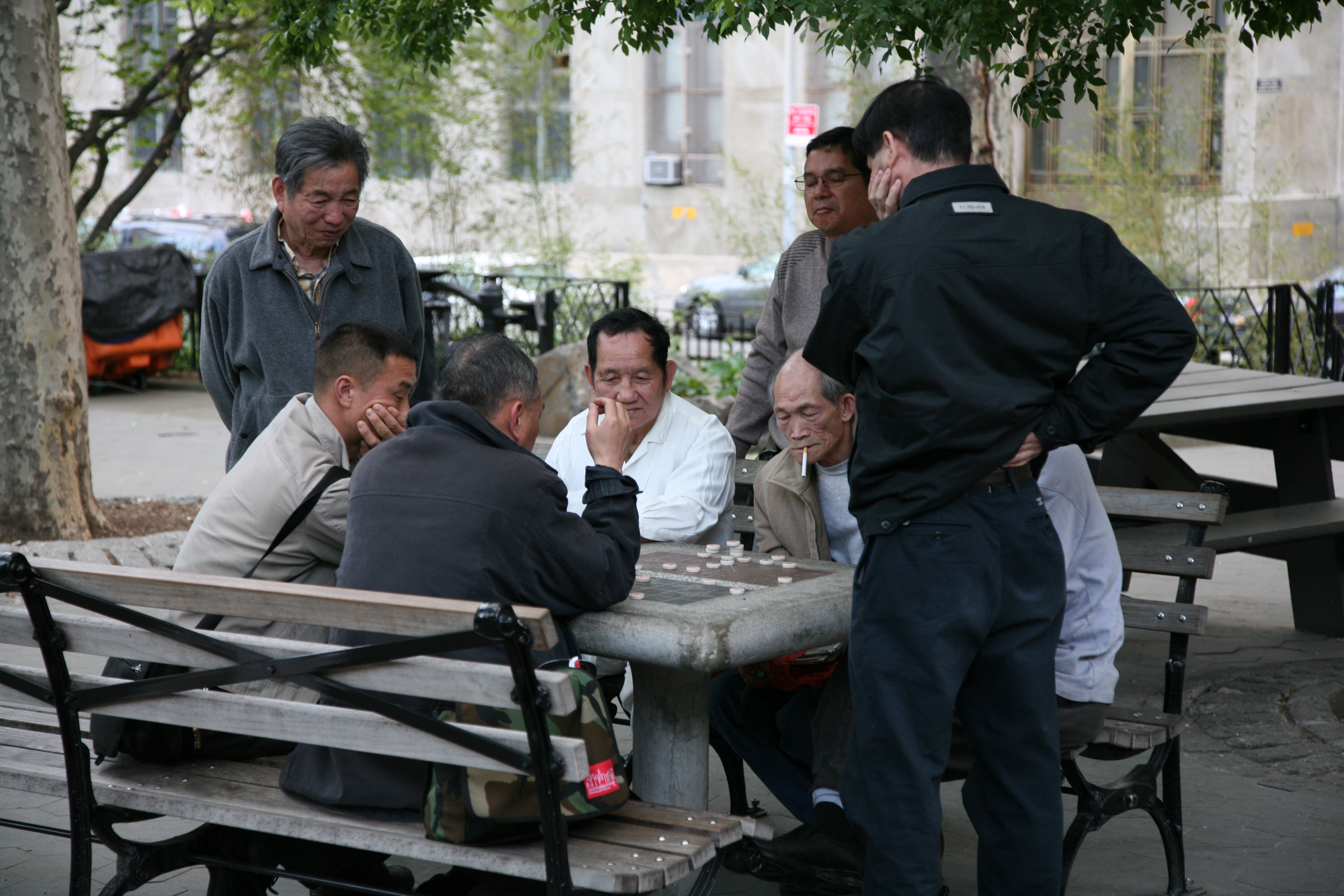
Columbus Park

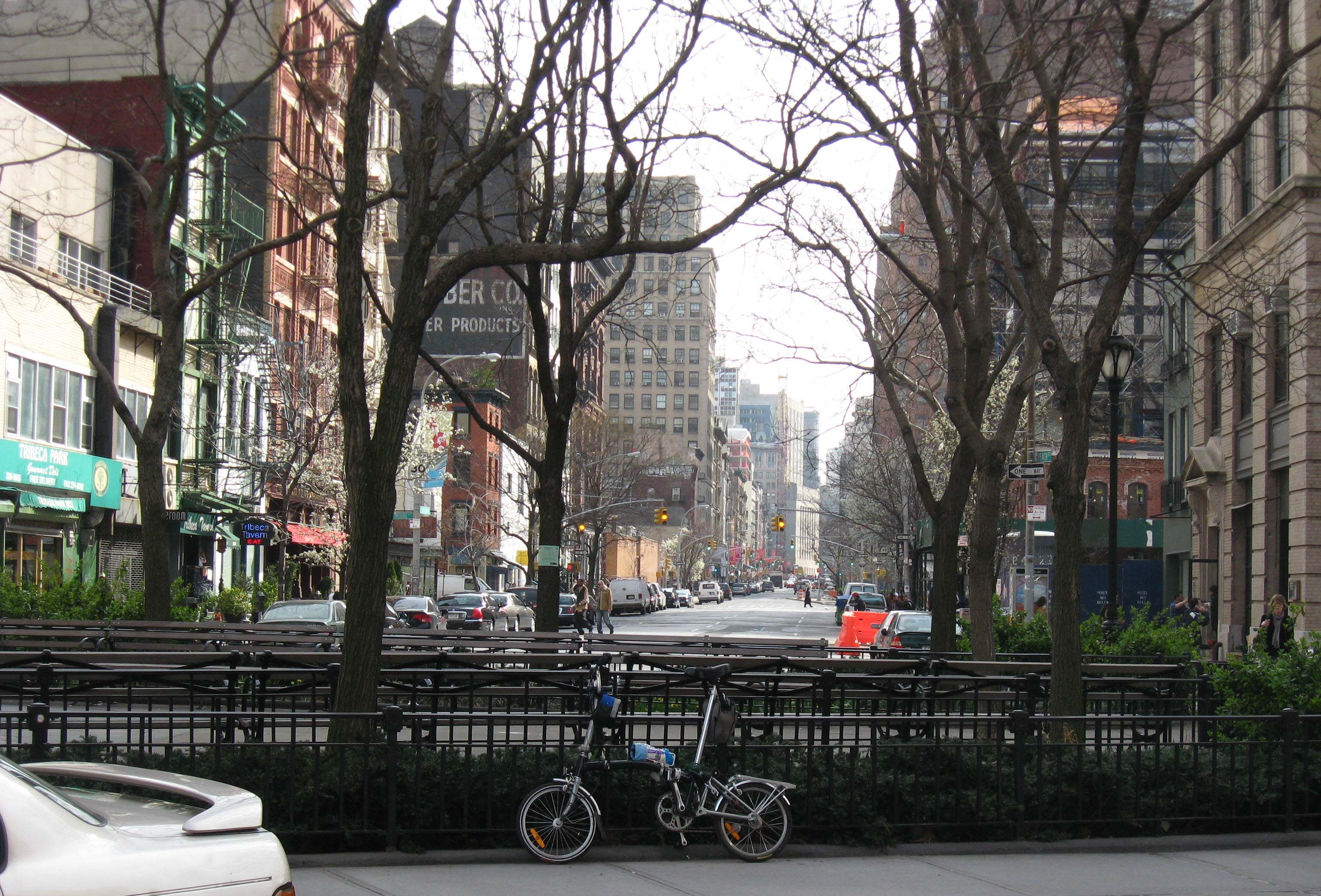
Tribeca Park

- 79th Street Boat Basin
- Abe Lebewohl Park
- Abraham Lincoln Playground
- Abingdon Square Park
- Albert Capsouto Park
- Andrew Haswell Green Park
- Asphalt Green
- The Battery
- Bella Abzug (Hudson) Park
- Bellevue South Park
- Bennett Park
- Blackwell Island Light, Roosevelt Island
- British Garden at Hanover Square
- Bowling Green
- Bryant Park
- Captain Patrick J. Brown Walk
- Carl Schurz Park
- Central Park
- Chelsea Park
- City Hall Park
- Collect Pond
- Columbus Park
- Corlears Hook
- Dag Hammarskjold Plaza
- Damrosch Park
- Dante Park
- DeSalvio Playground
- DeWitt Clinton Park
- Drumgoole Plaza
- Duane Park
- East River Greenway
  - East River Esplanade
  - East River Park
  - Stuyvesant Cove
- Father Demo Square
- Finn Square
- Foley Square
- Fort Tryon Park
- Fort Washington Park
- Franklin D. Roosevelt Four Freedoms Park (NYSP)
- Golden Swan Garden
- Gorman Park
- Governors Island
  - Governors Island National Monument (NPS)
- Gramercy Park
- Greenacre Park
- Hamilton Fish Park
- Hancock Park
- Hanover Square
- Harlem River Park
- Hell's Kitchen Park
- Herald Square
- High Line
- Highbridge Park
- Holcombe Rucker Park
- Hudson River Park
- Imagination Playground at Burling Slip
- Inwood Hill Park
- Isham Park
- Jay Hood Wright Park
- Jackie Robinson Park
- Jackson Square Park
- John Jay Park
- Liberty Park
- Louis Cuvillier Park
- MacArthur Playground
- Madison Square
- Manhattan Waterfront Greenway
- Marcus Garvey Park
- Mill Rock Park
- Mitchel Square Park
- Montefiore Square
- Morningside Park
- Murphy Brothers Playground
- Muscota Marsh
- Nelson A. Rockefeller Park
- Paley Park
- Peretz Square
- Cooper Triangle
- Peter Detmold Park
- Plaza Lafayette
- Queen Elizabeth II September 11th Garden
- Ralph Bunche Park
- Randalls and Wards Islands
- Richard Tucker Square
- Riverbank State Park (NYSP)
- Riverside Park
- Robert Moses Playground
- Roosevelt Triangle
- Rucker Park
- Sakura Park
- Samuel N. Bennerson 2nd Playground
- Sara Delano Roosevelt Park
- Septuagesimo Uno
- Seward Park
- Sheridan Square
- Sherman Square
- Southpoint Park, Roosevelt Island
- St. Nicholas Park
- St. Vartan Park
- Straus Park
- Stuyvesant Square
- Sunshine Playground
- Swindler Cove Park
- Teardrop Park
- Theodore Roosevelt Park
- Thomas Jefferson Park
- Thomas Paine Park
- Tompkins Square Park
- Tribeca Park
- Union Square
- Verdi Square
- Vesuvio Playground
- Vincent F. Albano Jr. Playground
- Randalls and Wards Islands
- Washington Market Park
- Washington Square Park
- West Harlem Piers
- West Side Community Garden
- Winston Churchill Park
- Zuccotti Park

=== Queens ===
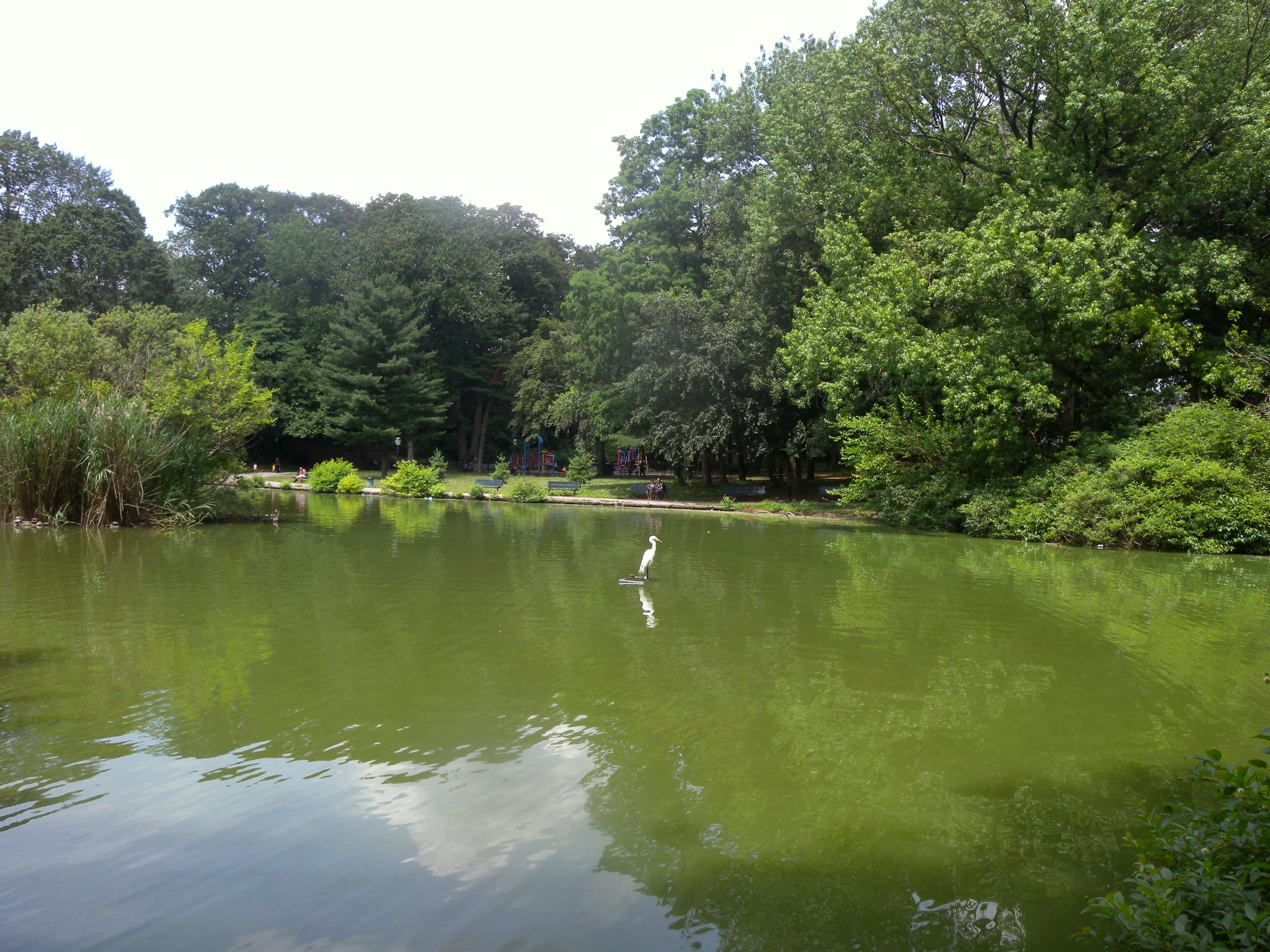
Captain Tilly Park

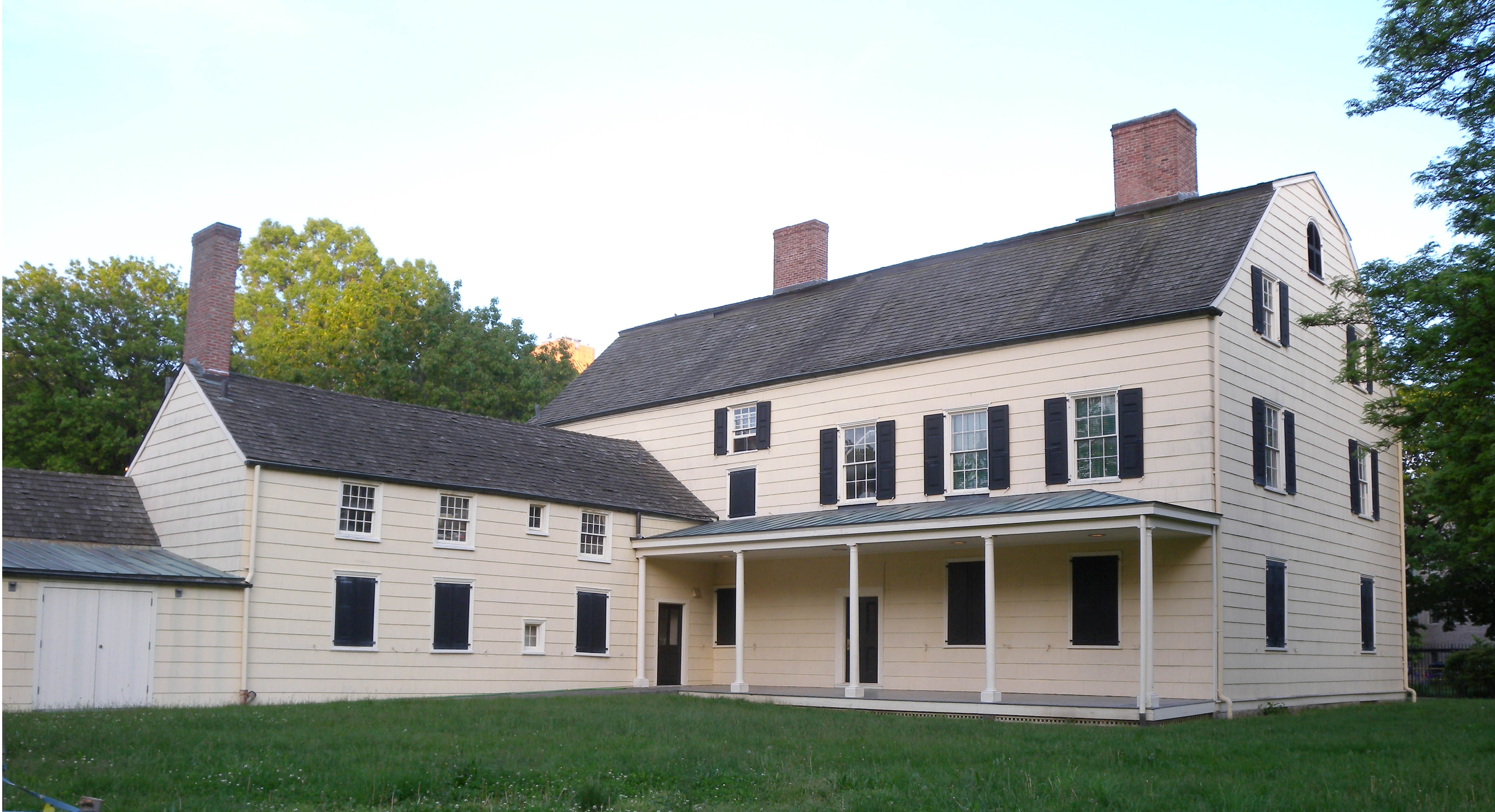
Rufus King Park

- Admiral Park
- Alley Park
- Alley Pond Park
- Andrews Grove
- Astoria Park
- Baisley Pond Park
- Bayside Fields
- Bayswater Park
- Bayswater Point State Park (NYSP)
- Beach Channel Park
- Big Bush Park
- Bowne Park
- Brant Point Wildlife Sanctuary
- Breininger Park
- Broad Channel American Park
- Broad Channel Park
- Broad Channel Wetlands
- Brooklyn–Queens Greenway
- Brookville Park
- Bulova Park
- Captain Tilly Park
- Crocheron Park
- Cunningham Park
- Detective Keith L Williams Park
- Detective William T. Gunn Park
- Dr. Charles R. Drew Park
- Dubos Point Wildlife Sanctuary
- Doughboy Park
- Douglaston Park
- Elmhurst Park
- Evergreen Park
- Flushing Fields
- Flushing Meadows–Corona Park
- Forest Park
- Fort Tilden (NPS - Gateway National Recreation Area)
- Fort Totten
- Francis Lewis Park
- Frank Golden Park
- Frank M. Charles Memorial Park
- Frank Principe Park
- Gantry Plaza State Park (NYSP)
- Haggerty Park
- Harvey Park
- Highland Park
- Hinton Park
- Hoffman Park
- Hook Creek Park
- Hunter's Point Park
- Idlewild Park
- Jamaica Bay Park
- Jamaica Bay Wildlife Refuge (NPS - Gateway National Recreation Area)
- Jacob Riis Park (NPS - Gateway National Recreation Area)
- John Golden Park
- Juniper Valley Park
- Kissena Park
- Kohlreiter Square
- L/CPL Thomas P. Noonan Jr. Playground
- Libra Triangle
- Linnaeus Park
- Little Bay Park
- Louis Pasteur Park
- Lt. Michael R. Davidson Playground
- Mafera Park
- Macneil Park
- Marconi Park
- Marie Curie Park
- Murray Playground
- Montbellier Park
- O'Donohue Park
- Overlook Park
- Park of the Americas
- Phil "Scooter" Rizzuto
- Police Officer Edward Byrne Park
- Powell's Cove Park
- Queens Botanical Garden
- Queens County Farm Museum
- Queens Zoo
- Queensbridge Park
- Rachel Carson Playground
- Railroad Park
- Rainey Park
- Ralph Demarco Park
- Rochdale Park
- Rockaway Beach and Boardwalk
- Rockaway Community Park
- Roy Wilkins Park
- Rufus King Park
- Seagirt Avenue Wetlands
- Socrates Sculpture Park
- Spring Creek Park
- Springfield Park
- St. Albans Park
- Sunnyside Gardens Park
- Torsney Playground
- Travers Park
- Triangle 54
- Tudor Park
- Udall's Park Preserve
- Yellowstone Park
- Wayanda Park
- Whitney Ford Field

=== Staten Island ===
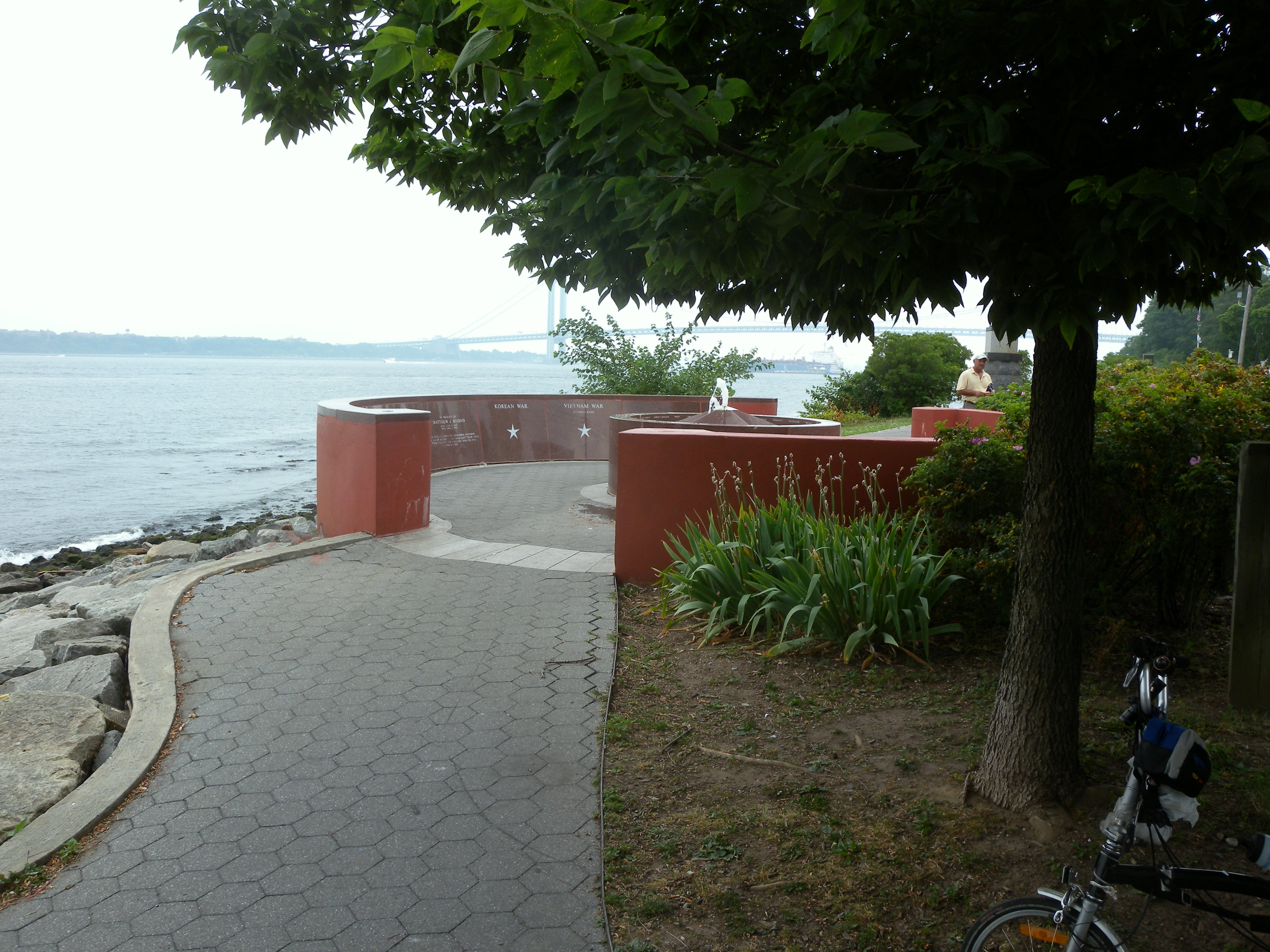
Buono Beach

- Aesop Park
- Allison Pond Park
- Amundsen Circle
- Annadale Green
- Arbutus Woods Park
- Arden Woods
- Alice Austen House
- Barrett Park
- Bayview Terrace Park
- Blood Root Valley
- Bloomingdale Park
- Blue Heron Park Preserve
- Blueberry Park
- Bradys Park
- Bunker Ponds Park
- Buono Beach
- Carlton Park
- Clay Pit Ponds State Park Preserve (NYSP)
- Clove Lakes Park
- Clove's Tail
- Conference House Park
- Corporal Thompson Park
- Crescent Beach Park
- Deere Park
- Eibs Pond Park
- Faber Pool and Park
- Fairview Park
- Father Macris Park
- Forest Grove
- Fort Hill Park
- Fort Wadsworth (NPS - Gateway National Recreation Area)
- South Beach–FDR Boardwalk
- Freshkills Park
- Gaeta Park
- Great Kills Park (NPS - Gateway National Recreation Area)
- Graniteville Quarry Park
- Graniteville Swamp Park
- Hero Park
- High Rock Park Preserve
- Huguenot Ponds Park
- Hybrid Oak Woods Park
- Ingram Woods
- Jones Woods Park
- Joseph Manna Park
- King Fisher Park
- Kingdom Pond Park
- Last Chance Pond Park
- LaTourette Park and Golf Course
- Lemon Creek
- Liotti Ikefugi Playground
- Long Pond Park
- General Douglas MacArthur Park
- Maple Woods
- Mariners Marsh Park
- Meredith Woods
- Midland Beach
- Midland Field
- Miller Field (NPS - Gateway National Recreation Area)
- Mount Loretto Unique Area
- New Dorp Beach
- Northerleigh Park
- Ocean Breeze Park
- Old Place Creek Park
- Olmsted-Beil House Park
- Reed's Basket Willow Swamp Park
- Richmond Terrace Wetlands
- Sailors' Snug Harbor
  - Staten Island Botanical Garden
  - New York Chinese Scholar's Garden
- Saw Mill Creek Marsh
- Schmul Park
- Seaside Wildlife Nature Park
- Siedenburg Park
- Silver Lake
- Sobel Court Park
- South Beach Wetlands
- St. George Park
- Staten Island Greenbelt
- Staten Island Industrial Park
- Tappen Park
- Tompkinsville Park
- Tottenville Shore Park
- Von Briesen Park
- Walker Park
- Wegener Park
- Westerleigh Park
- Westwood Park
- Willowbrook Park
- Wolfe's Pond Park

* Denotes playgrounds jointly operated with the New York City Department of Education.

== List of former parks by borough ==
=== Manhattan ===
- St. John's Park

== See also ==
- 10-Minute Walk
- List of privately owned public spaces in New York City
- List of New York state parks
- New York City Department of Parks and Recreation
- Park Conservancy
- Skateparks in New York City
