= Dr. Ronald McNair Park =

Municipal park in New York City

- Dr. Ronald McNair Park in 2017

- Location within New York City Location within New York Location within the United States
- Type: Urban park
- Location: Prospect Heights, Brooklyn, New York City, New York, United States
- Coordinates: 40°40′14″N 73°57′44″W
- Area: 1.36-acre (0.0055 km^{2})
- Created: 1905
- Website: Official website

Dr. Ronald McNair Park is a municipal park in Prospect Heights, Brooklyn, New York City. It is a 1.36-acre triangular park located east of the Brooklyn Museum, between Eastern Parkway to the north, Washington Avenue to the west, and Classon Avenue to the east. Originally opened in 1905, the park was named for Brooklyn Borough President Joseph A. Guider and renamed in 1986 for Ronald Erwin McNair, a NASA astronaut and physicist killed in the Space Shuttle Challenger disaster. It contains a 1930 memorial to Guider and a 1994 monument to McNair.

== History ==
A public park was first established on the site in 1905 following the opening of the Brooklyn Museum at its current location in 1897. The architecture firm McKim, Mead & White, who designed the Brooklyn Museum, advocated for the land to be acquired as parkland to preserve the open space east of the museum. The park took its present layout in 1911.

In 1926, the park was named for Joseph A. Guider (1870-1926), who died in office that year. Guider had previously served in the New York State Assembly, during which he introduced and passed legislation allowing cyclists to cross the Brooklyn Bridge free of charge. He was named Commissioner of Public Works in Brooklyn in 1918 and became Brooklyn Borough President in 1925, serving until his death on September 22, 1926 at the age of 56. Another park in Brooklyn, Guider Mall on Coney Island Avenue, continues to bear his name.

In 1986, the park was renamed for Ronald McNair (1950-1986) following the destruction of the Space Shuttle Challenger on January 28 of that year. McNair, the second African-American astronaut to travel into space, was one of the seven crew members killed aboard the Challenger. Another municipal park, Dr. Ronald E. McNair Playground, was established in the same year in Harlem near the location of an auto repair shop once owned by McNair's father, which he visited in his youth.

== Monuments ==
=== Dr. Ronald E. McNair Monument ===
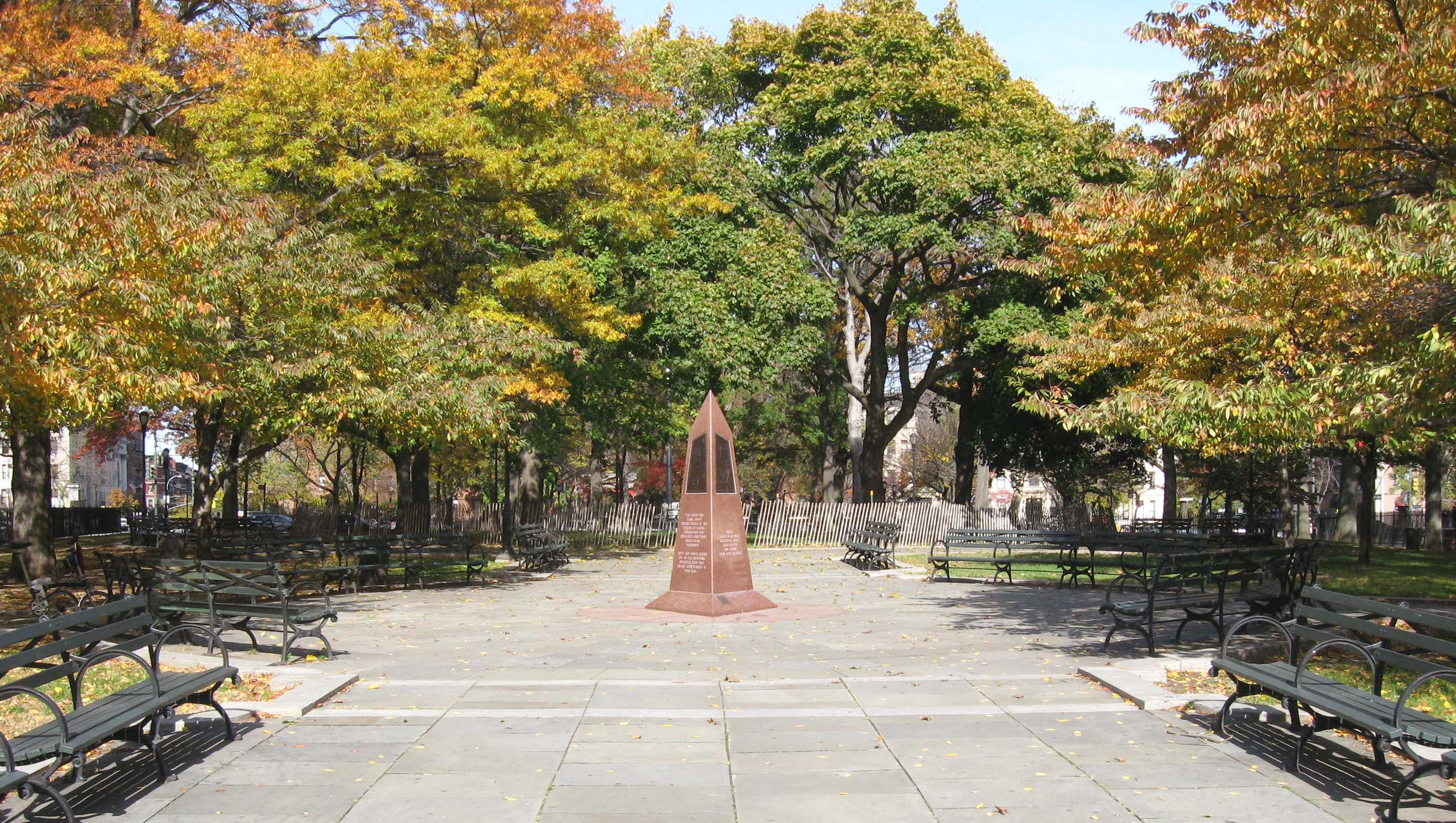
Dr. Ronald E. McNair Monument

Through a competition sponsored by the New York City Department of Cultural Affairs, Nigerian-born, Brooklyn-based sculptor Ogundipe Fayomi was selected to create a central sculpture for the park. Installed in 1994, the sculpture features a bronze bust of McNair set within a pyramid-shaped pedestal of pink granite resembling a modified rocket ship. The pedestal features bronze reliefs depicting McNair's interests in spaceflight, teaching, and karate, in which he held a black belt. The monument is inscribed with a wish attributed to McNair by the New York City Parks Department, which reads:

MY WISH IS THAT WE WOULD ALLOW THIS PLANET TO BE THE BEAUTIFUL OASIS THAT SHE IS, AND ALLOW OURSELVES TO LIVE MORE IN THE PEACE THAT SHE GENERATES.

=== Joseph A. Guider Memorial ===
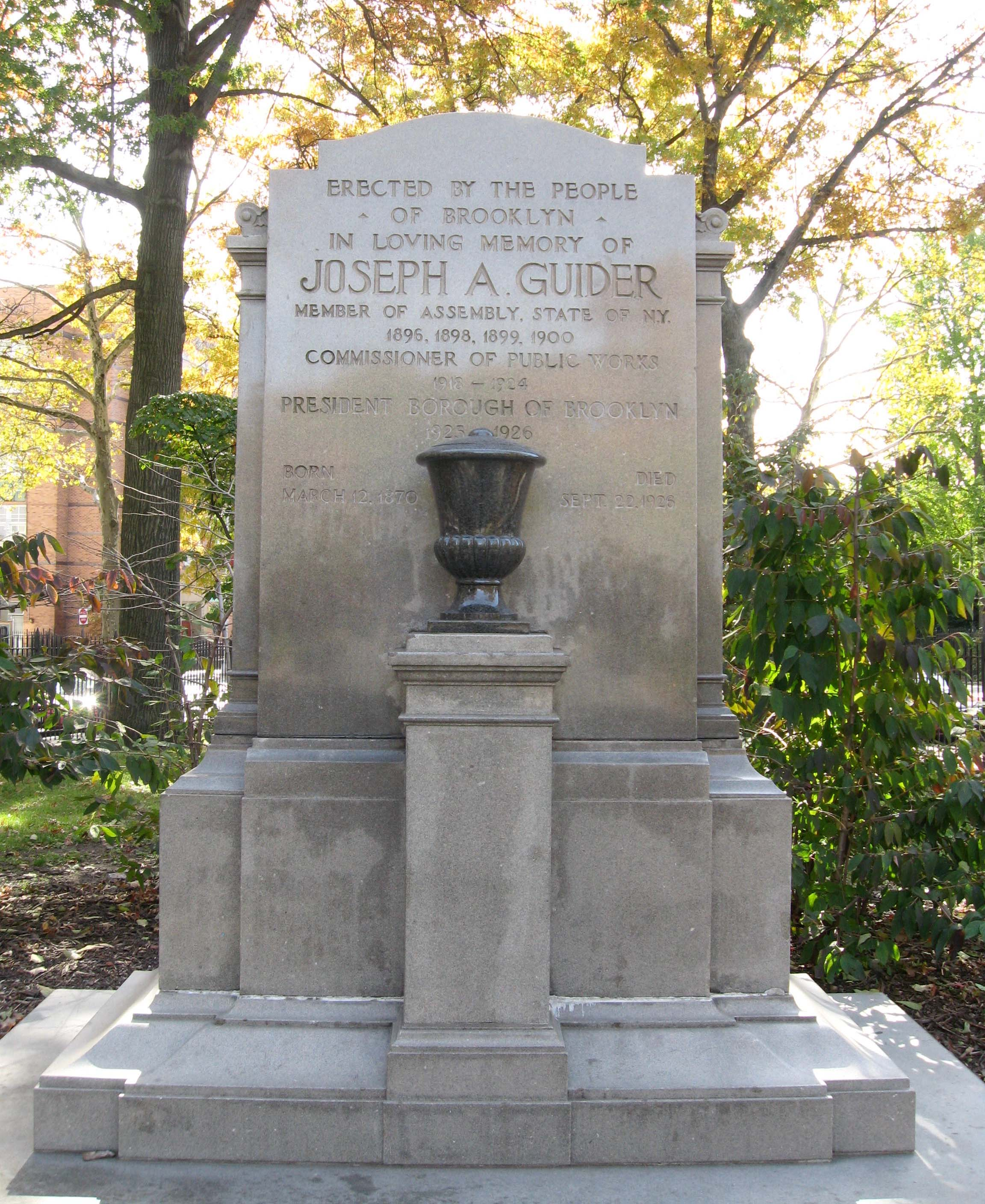
Joseph Guider Memorial

The Guider memorial was dedicated in 1930. It originally featured a bronze bust of Guider by sculptor Romeo Frazzanito, which was later stolen. In 1994, when the McNair monument was installed, the Guider memorial was relocated from the center of the park to its south end and the missing bust was replaced with a granite urn intended to hold seasonal flowers.

== See also ==
- List of parks in New York City
