= Gorman Park =

Public park in Manhattan, New York

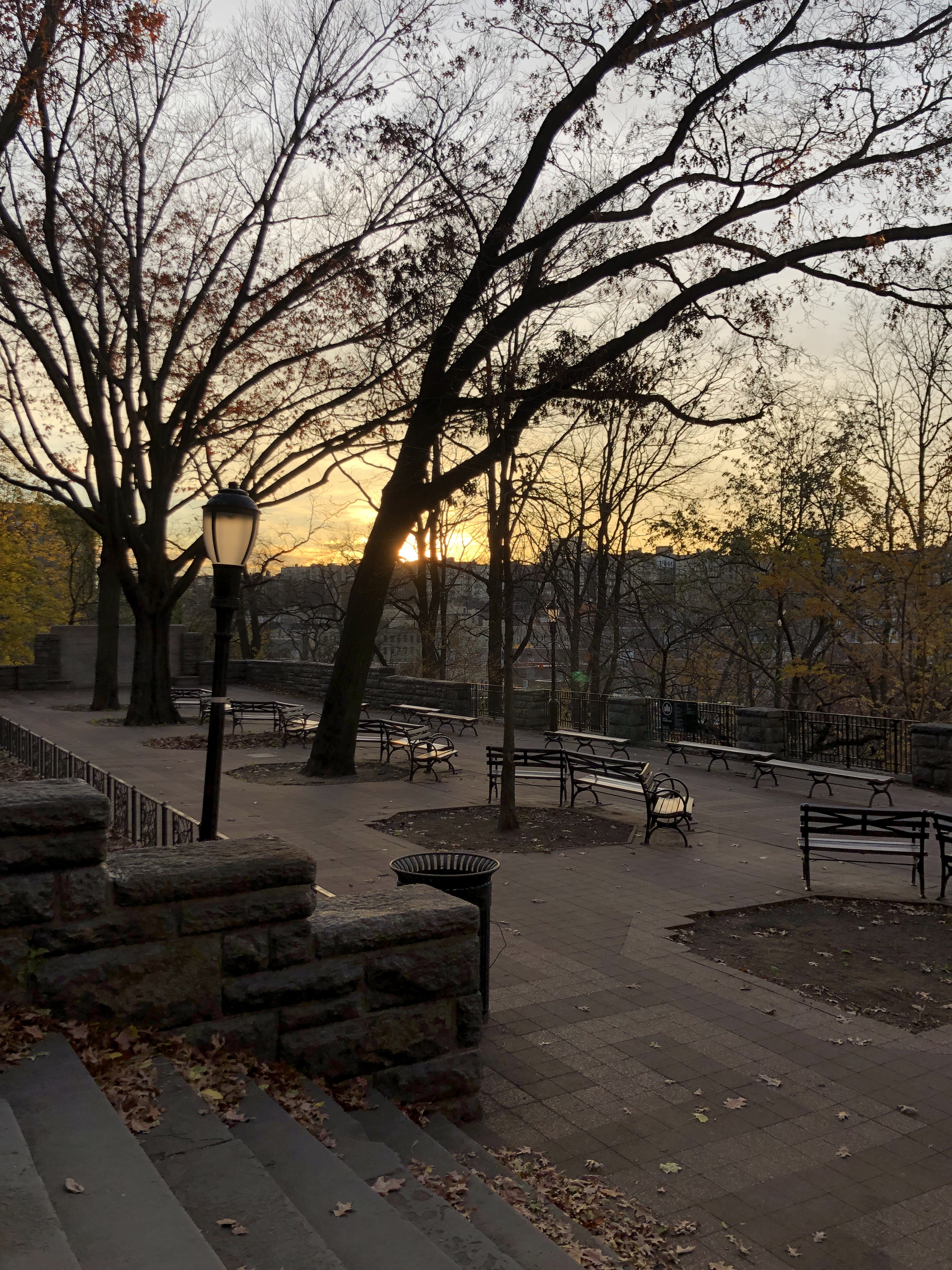
- Upper plaza of Amelia Gorman Park in winter, at Wadsworth Terrace
- Interactive map of Gorman Park
- Type: Urban park
- Location: Fort George, New York, NY
- Coordinates: 40°51′19.5″N 73°55′55.7″W
- Area: 1.89 acres (0.76 ha; 0.00295 mi^{2}; 0.0076 km^{2})
- Operator: NYC Parks
- Open: All year

Gorman Park (or Amelia Gorman Park) is a 1.89-acre (0.76 ha) park in Washington Heights, Manhattan, New York City. It is bounded by Broadway on the west and Wadsworth Terrace on the east, lying between 188th and 190th Streets.

The upper plaza of the park, along Wadsworth Terrace, is situated at an elevation of about 210 feet (64 m). At Broadway, at the bottom of the park, the elevation is about 120 feet (37 m). The land rises in a steep incline from Broadway to Wadsworth Terrace, and the park features a stone stairway and path that winds upward among trees, an important thoroughfare connecting Broadway and Wadsworth.

However, most of the park and the connection from the lower to upper sections of 188–190th Street have been closed since 2017. As of January 2024, due to the city's failure to complete repairs of the retaining wall, only the upper plaza is open. The closure ended residents' access between the upper and lower neighborhoods without going many blocks north or south, so what was once a walk of 330 feet now requires walking one-third of a mile.

== History ==
The park is dedicated to a mother and daughter, Gertie Amelia Gorman and Gertie Emily Gorman. Gertie Emily Gorman and Charles Webb (a real estate investor and Yale graduate) had been married for less than a year when she died on September 25, 1923. Many of Gorman's relatives and friends suspected that Webb had poisoned his wife, though a toxicology investigation did not find evidence of such poisoning. For five years Gorman's will was disputed. A will dated August 21, 1923, left her entire estate to her husband and superseded a will that would have divided the proceeds among her relatives.

Webb donated two acres of land to the city in 1929 in honor of both his wife and her mother. A monument made of Deer Isle granite, created by the artist C. Fisher Weimer, features an inscription dedicating the park to "Gertie A. Gorman", as Webb's wife had wished.

A grand pathway with a retaining wall was constructed during the 1930s, with landscaping along the stairway connecting the upper and lower parts of the park.

In 2000, Council Member Guillermo Linares allocated $980,000 towards a reconstruction and landscaping of Gorman Park that began in the summer of 2001.

=== Development dispute (2011) ===
In 2011 the park became the focus of a local zoning and land use dispute when Quadriad Realty Partners proposed to build four residential towers, taller than permitted under the by-right zoning rules, in a lot adjacent to the park. The developers sought a permit to build the towers in exchange for renovating and adding land to the park. However, the Community Board rejected the proposal, and the towers were not constructed. A lot adjacent to the park remains vacant as of 2024.

== Closure and new reconstruction project (2017–present) ==
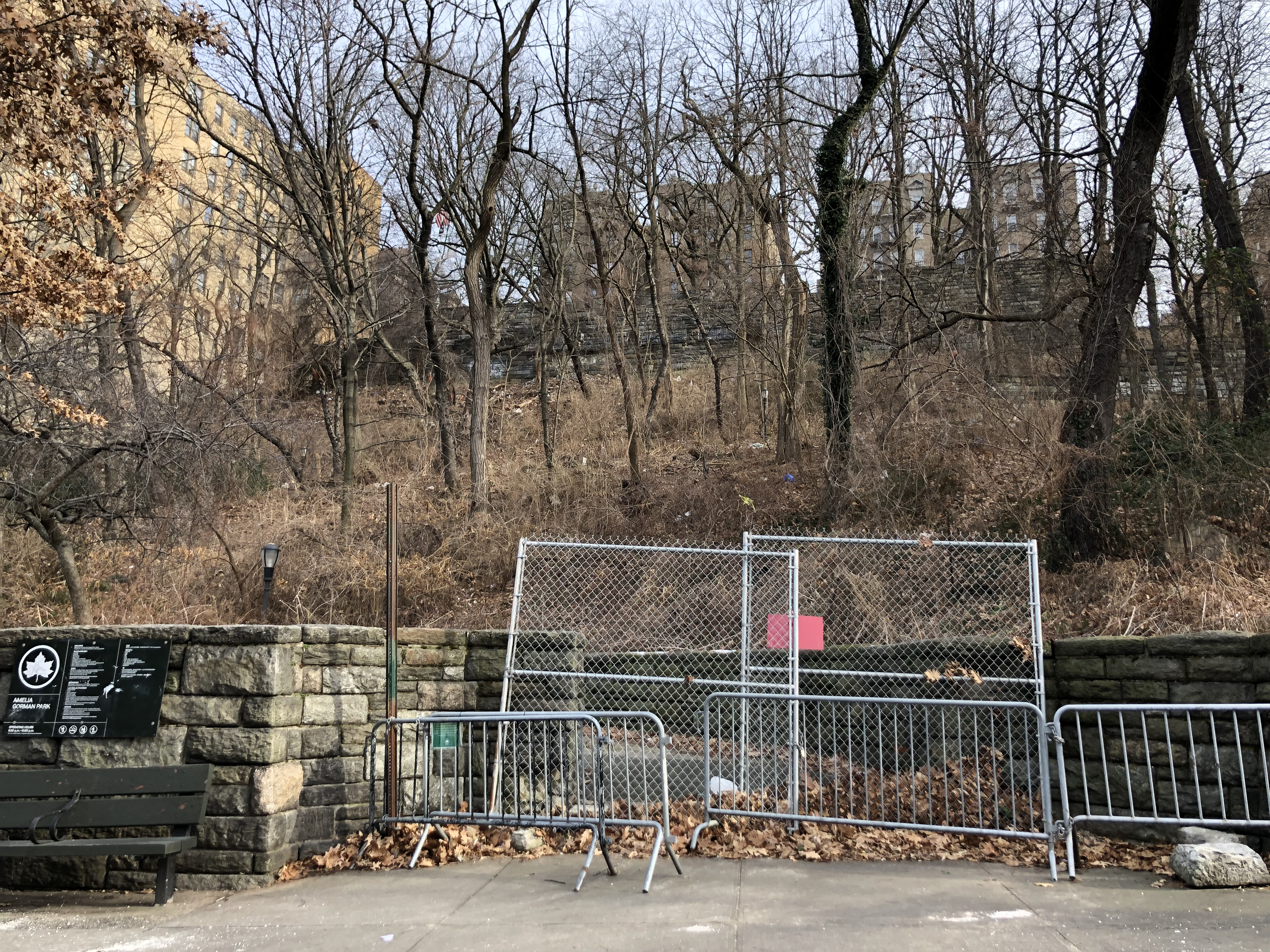
Lower park entrance from Broadway, closed since 2017

The park was closed to the public in 2017 with the exception of the upper plaza, after part of the cladding of the retaining wall collapsed in March 2017. The walkway and stairs were closed due to the possibility that the wall would collapse further. A New York City Department of Parks and Recreation capital reconstruction project to reconstruct a retaining wall began in November 2019. However, the City put the project on hold, attributing the delay to the impact of COVID-19.

In November 2020, NYC Parks staff presented to a community board on the status of the park's land, explaining that the "partially denuded slope has caused erosion and soil run-off which has clogged drainage structures," and the closed frontage along Broadway had become overgrown. They further noted that the proposed project would stabilize the collapsed stone façade, fix drainage lines, and address overgrowth for erosion control, but that re-landscaping and full rehabilitation of the park's infrastructure would exceed the project scope and budget.

In January 2022, the Parks Department published on its project tracker that its budget had been approved. Funding of $2,163,000 was listed as procured in October 2021. The design phase was completed in June 2022, a year and a half later than originally projected. In March 2023, the City's capital projects tracker stated that construction was expected to begin in November 2022. However, as of January 2024 the project had not begun and the Parks Department no longer listed Amelia Gorman Park repairs on its capital projects webpage.

In 2026, City Council Member Carmen De La Rosa, who has represented Washington Heights since 2022, announced that funding had been earmarked for restoration of the retaining wall. This was the first public announcement that reconstruction would resume since the COVID-19 pandemic disrupted plans to restore the stairway and reopen the park six years prior.
