= Long Pond Park =

Nature refuge in Staten Island, New York

Coordinates: 40°30′54″N 74°13′40″W

Long Pond Park is a park preserve on the South Shore of Staten Island, New York City. It is approximately 115 acres (0.47 km^{2}) in size and consists mainly of woodlands and wetlands that surround Long Pond, for which the park is named. Long Pond Park is roughly bounded by Hylan Boulevard on the south, Page Avenue on the west, Amboy Road on the north, and Richard Avenue on the east. It is an important stopping point for migrating birds in the Atlantic Flyway.

The majority of parkland was created in 1997 when the New York City Department of Parks and Recreation acquired 90 acres (36 ha) of land surrounding Long Pond. Another Sixteen acres (6.5 ha) were added in 2001 and 1.6 acres (0.65 ha) were added in 2006. In addition to serving as a nature preserve, Long Pond Park also forms part of the Staten Island Bluebelt, a stormwater drainage system.
