= John J. Carty Park =

Public park in Brooklyn, New York

Coordinates: 40°36′44″N 74°01′51″W

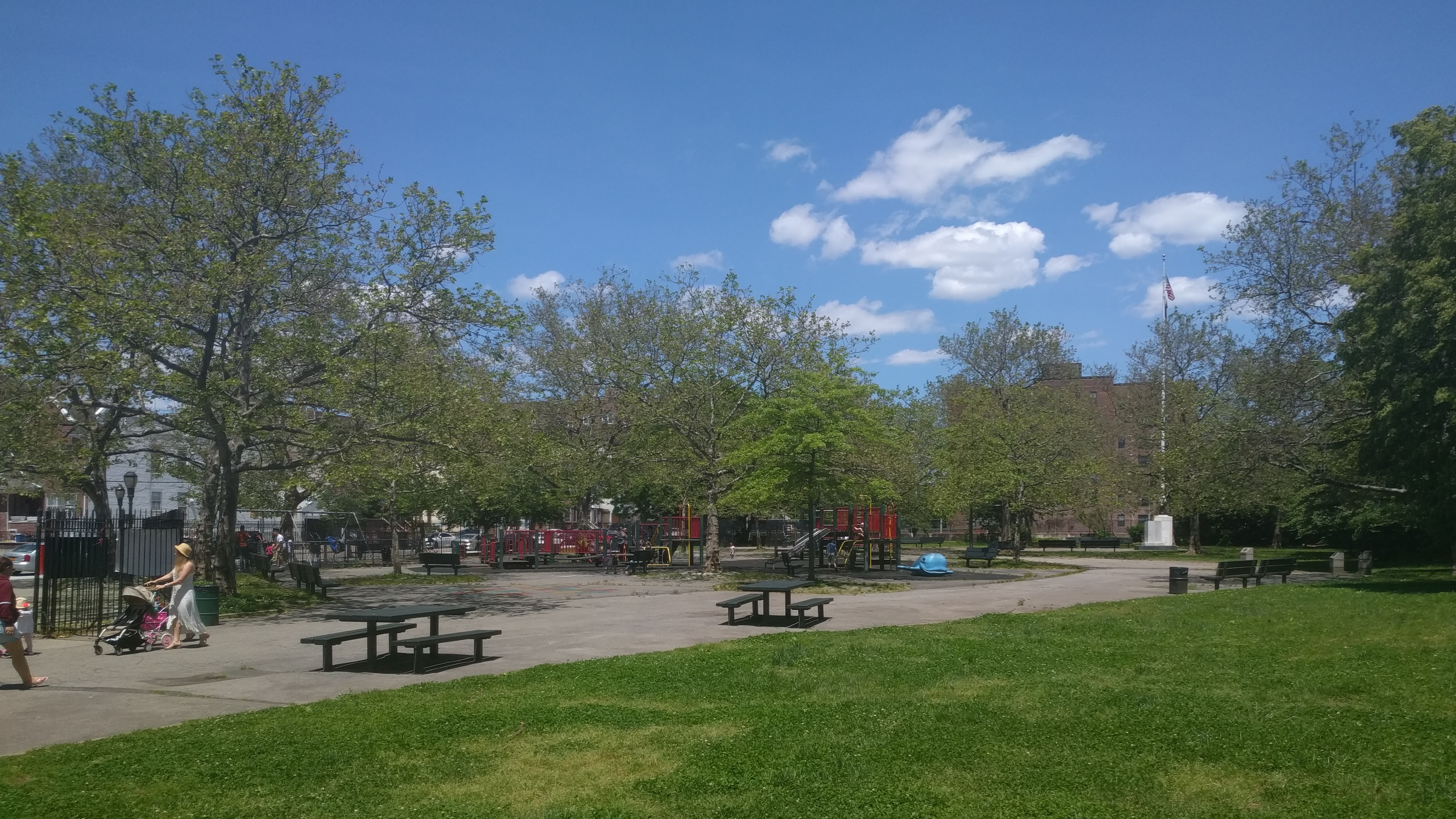

John J. Carty Park, also known as Rubber Park, is located in Bay Ridge, Brooklyn. This park honors John J. Carty (1909–1970), a native of Bay Ridge, Brooklyn who lived his life only five blocks away and dedicated himself to New York City government for 32 years.

== History ==
Rubber Park was opened in 1964 and was one of the first parks in New York City to have rubber matting under the children's’ equipment thus the name of Rubber Park. Rubber Park has been the home of numerous groups of kids and teens since its opening.

John J. Carty Park, located between 94th and 101st Streets and Fort Hamilton Parkway, was named by Local Law in 1971. The Triborough Bridge and Tunnel Authority (TBTA) developed both the Verrazzano–Narrows Bridge (1965) and this park concurrently thanks to a 1956 federal grant. The playground section of the park contains benches, a large comfort station, numerous game tables, two drinking fountains, and a flagpole with a yardarm on a monument base. Play areas consist of red, yellow, green, and white play equipment with safety surfacing, a spray shower, tot and regular swings, basketball and handball courts, and a large asphalt play area. The additional park area, which is surrounded by a variety of trees, has a multitude of benches as well as picnic tables, a bocce court, and ten tennis courts. The area provides recreational activities for all.

== Facilities ==
The park covers over ten acres and has been home to dances, concerts, and picnics. The park is also the home of the Fort Hamilton Senior Center. With over 700 members, Fort Hamilton Senior Center serves as a lively gathering place for senior citizens throughout Brooklyn. The center has a card room, library, dance and recreation room, an arts and crafts room, and a computer room. Established in 1966 under the TBTA's neighborhood improvement plan, the center officially opened on January 20, 1967.
