= Graniteville Quarry Park =

Public park in Staten Island, New York

Coordinates: 40°37′29″N 74°09′14″W

Graniteville Quarry Park is a public park operated by the New York City Department of Parks and Recreation, located on the North Shore of Staten Island, in the Graniteville area. The park is bordered on the north by Forest Avenue, on the south by Wilcox Street, on the east by the Christ United Methodist Church property and the backyards of private homes, all on Eunice Place, and on the west by Van Name Avenue, and in places, backyards of homes on that same street.

== Geography and geology ==
The land of the park is at a higher elevation than the surrounding area, and had been quarried extensively in the nineteenth century for trap rock, from the Swedish "trappa," meaning stairway, describing how the rock formations looked.

Walls and foundations all over the island are composed of this rock. It is rumored that the rock was also placed in the waterway directly adjacent to Fort Sumter.

Today, the park is mostly flat, having been used as a dumping ground for dirt fill during the 1980s and 1990s Staten Island building boom by local builders and contractors. Formerly, there had been a deep indentation in the ground, in the "shape of an amphitheatre," according to Professor Alan Benimoff. Some rock formations still jut out of the ground, and form a sizeable portion of the park, but it's mostly been covered by illegal dumping of fill.

In 1977, Benimoff discovered Trondhjemite at the quarry, while pursuing his Doctoral Dissertation at Lehigh University in Pennsylvania. Glacial grooves are also apparent in the many outcropping at the quarry. Studying igneous rocks at the time, expecting to find two contiguous rocks, the xenolith and the diabase, Professor Benimoff instead found a total of three. A chunk of xenolith that fell into the Palisades sill diabase formed a third rock with its own unique composition at the margins. This was the Trondhjemite, a rare mineral named for Trondheim, Norway, where it was first discovered. A portion of the park was ceded to developers in the 1980s, and now a portion of the original quarry lands is covered over by Wilcox Street and a townhouse complex on the north side of that street built without basements, as the structures sit directly atop the rock.

== History ==
Having operated from about 1840 to the late 1890s by the Bennett family, after whom Bennett Street in Port Richmond is named, and also the town of Graniteville at one time, the quarry sat fallow for almost one hundred years.

It was a popular hangout for teenagers in the 1960s and 1970s, as the deep bowl shaped depression did not allow sound to escape to neighboring streets, and the adolescents were free to engage in underage drinking and playing loud music. There were also dozens of rusted out carcasses of old cars, as stolen cars were left in the quarry, many of which were also burned.

Assemblywoman Elizabeth Connelly prevented the remaining exposed quarry from being completely covered by structures due to her ongoing efforts to preserve the land in the 1980s.

=== Conversion to park ===
Friends of the Graniteville Quarry Park helped to make the park a recognized park area. While the city did own the land, in a deal brokered by Ellen Pratt, leader of the Protectors of Pine Oaks nonprofit, the city-owned land sat for decades before Kathy Romanelli and Marco Justine formed a 501(c)(3) nonprofit called The Friends of the Graniteville Quarry, in 2001.

Over forty tons of trash were removed from the site, and it became an official city park. The Friends of Graniteville Quarry organizes a bi-annual cleanup, complementing the efforts of the Parks Department. The nonprofit, with help from community children, planted 1,500 flower bulbs, funded by a grant Councilwoman Debi Rose obtained for the park.

Benimoff, a full professor at the nearby College of Staten Island, takes students there on field trips each year to learn about the site, and about the unique geological formations to be found there.

== Transportation ==
The S44, S48 and S59 buses all stop within a block of the quarry.
