= Givans Creek Woods =

Public park in New York City

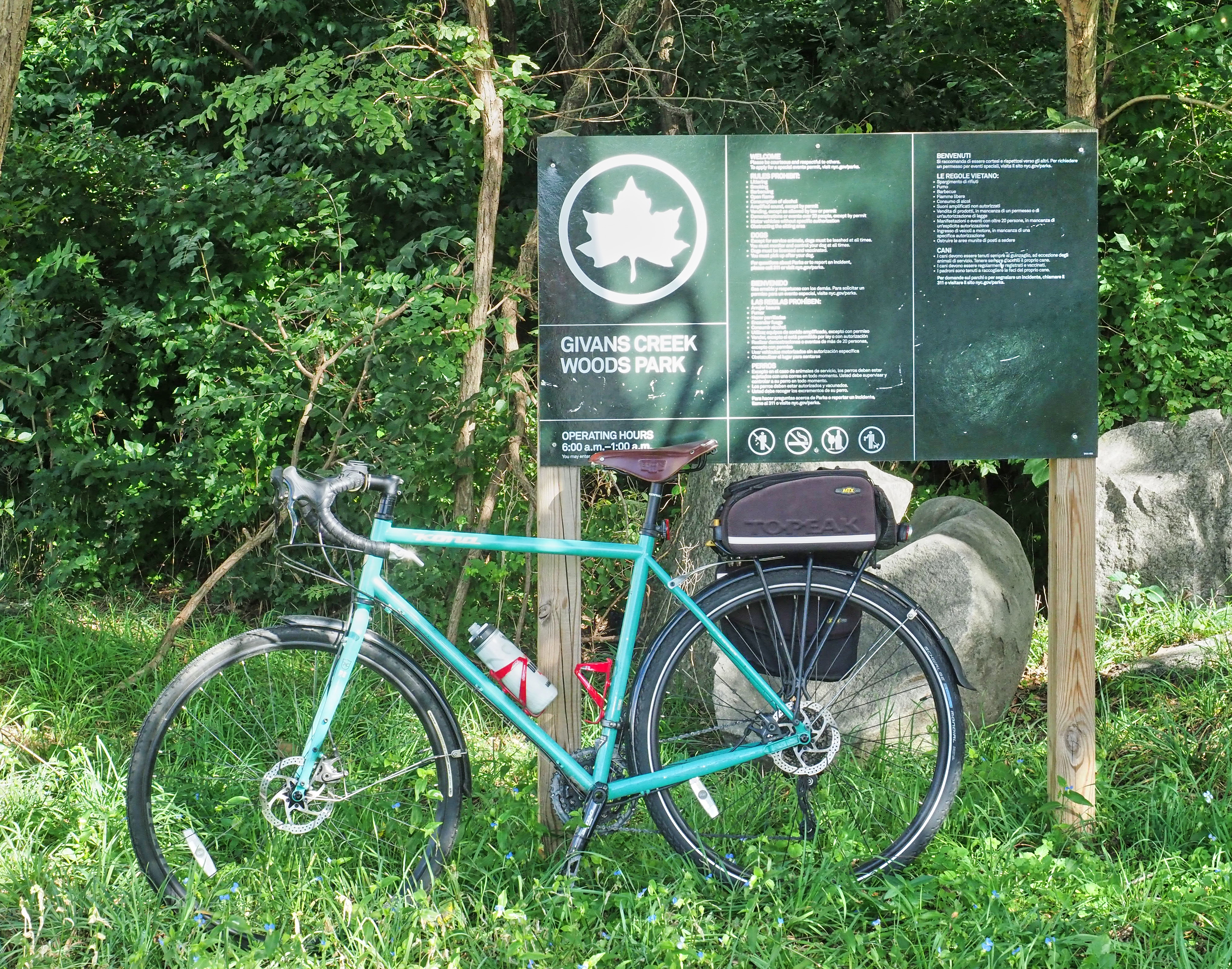
- Interactive map of Givans Creek Woods
- Location: The Bronx, New York, United States
- Coordinates: 40.8792°N 73.8327°W
- Area: 10.73 acres (4.34 ha)
- Authorized: 1995
- Owner: NYC Parks
- Hiking trails: no
- Terrain: wooded
- Public transit: Bx23, Bx28, Bx30, Bx38, Q50 buses
- Website: Official website

Givans Creek Woods is a 10.73-acre (4.34 ha) wooded area near Co-op City in The Bronx, New York City.

== History ==
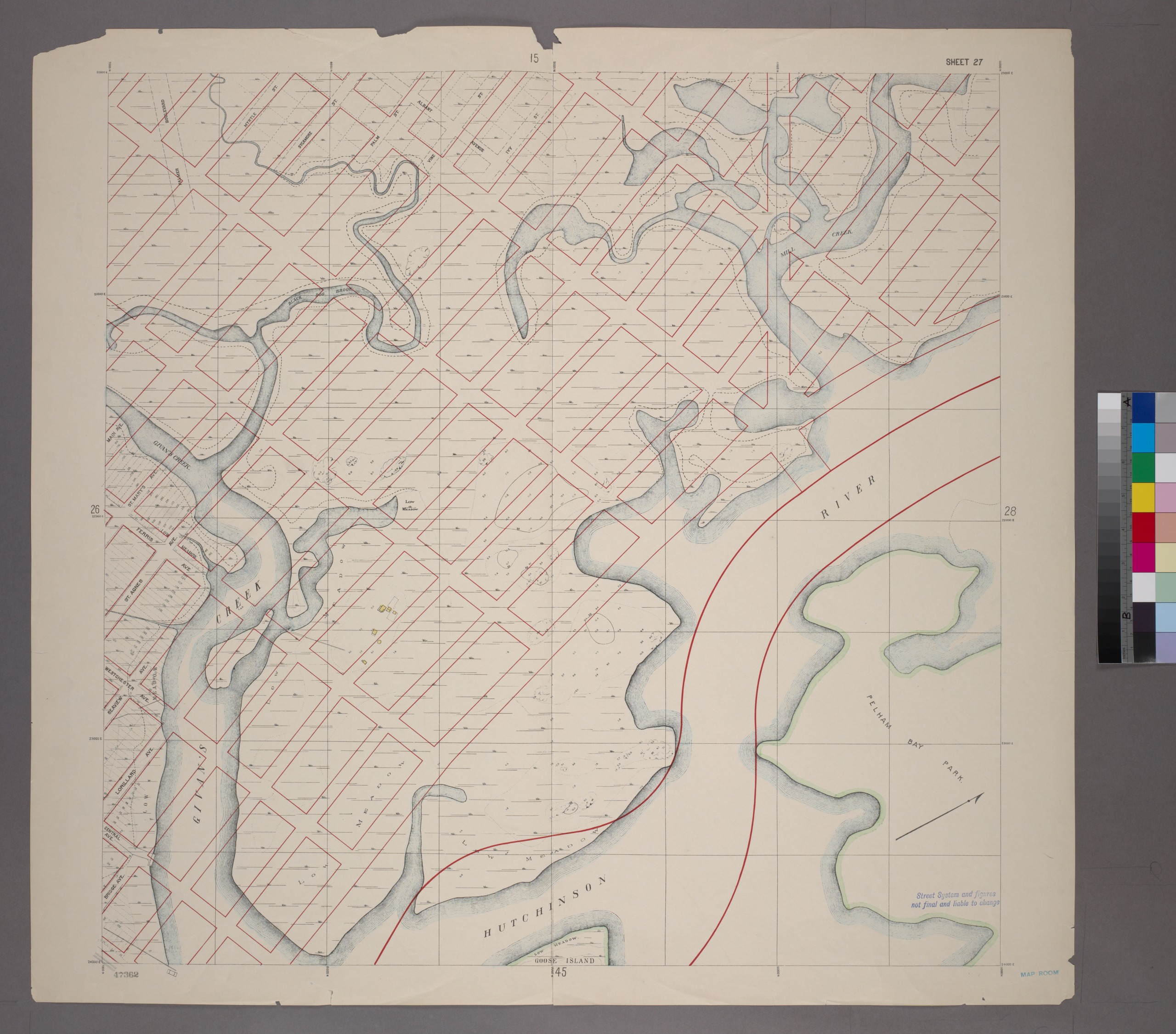
1905 Map showing Givans Creek. Street grid does not match modern layout.

Robert Givan emigrated to the area (at the time, a part of Westchester County) from Kelso, Scotland, in 1795, purchasing land along the western shore of the Hutchinson River and Eastchester Bay, which previously was owned by the Bartow family. Givan Creek was a tidal creek running through the area into the Hutchinson River, which Givan used to power a mill. When Givan died in 1830, his estate passed to his descendants of the Palmer, LeRoy, and Morgan families; local streets still bear those names. In 1881, the estate was further divided into lots for houses.

In 1921, building lots in the area were being advertised for sale as having "considerable frontage on Givans Creek.". In 1940, plans were made to extend the Hutchinson River Parkway south from Westchester County to the Bronx-Whitestone Bridge, including a bridge over Givans Creek.

== Creation of the park ==
By the 1980s, there was little undeveloped land left in the area. Local environmentalists worked to preserve what was left. In 1994, developers were looking to build on the Givans Creek Woods lot, but the NYC Department of City Planning agreed to turn the area into a park. What is now Givans Creek Woods was designated passive parkland in 1995. An organization of local residents, Friends of Givan Creek Woods, formed to help preserve the area.

By 1999, the area, which had been used to dump construction fill, had been overrun with an invasive plant species, Artemisia vularis L., commonly known as mugwort. At that time, the woods was partially replanted with several tree species, and the soil treated with additives, to eradicate the mugwort.

== Current day description ==
A 2007 survey described the woods as a 12.31-acre (4.98 ha) natural upland forest area bordered by the New England Thruway and Tillotson Avenue on the west, Rombouts Avenue on the north, and Co-op City Boulevard on the south and east. More than 150 plant species were found in the woods, most notably oak and hickory trees. Species protected by New York State included Flowering Dogwood, Wild Pink, and native ferns. There is a low-lying wooded wetland, meadows, and mosses and lichens on rocky outcrops. 45 animal species were found during the survey. The area is also known for woodcocks.

NYC Parks describes it as a 10.73-acre (4.34 ha) naturally diverse area. Givans Creek now runs underground beneath Co-op City.
