= Macri Triangle =

Green space in Brooklyn, New York

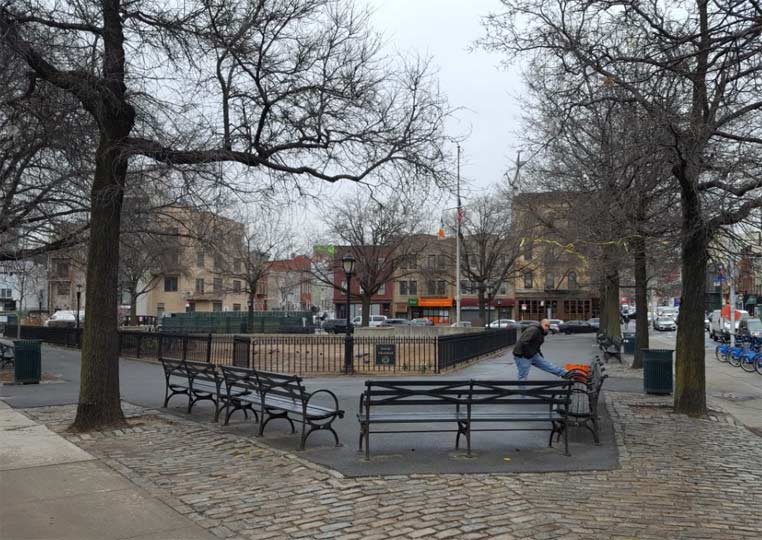
- Macri Triangle in 2018
- Interactive map of Macri Triangle
- Type: Public
- Location: Williamsburg, Brooklyn, New York City
- Coordinates: 40°42′37″N 73°57′14″W
- Area: 0.57 acres (0.23 ha)
- Opened: 1946
- Website: www.nycgovparks.org/parks/macri-triangle/

Macri Triangle is a 0.57-acre (0.23 ha) park and memorial located at the intersection of Meeker Avenue, Union Avenue, and Metropolitan Avenue in Williamsburg, Brooklyn, New York City.

== History ==
The property was designated as a park in 1946 during the construction of the Brooklyn-Queens Expressway, which resulted in the demolition of buildings along its route and the extension of Meeker Avenue from Richardson Street south to Metropolitan Avenue, serving as the expressway's service road. As the highway ran through the street grid, triangular parcels that were too small to be developed were designated as public plazas – including this one.

=== Name ===
In 1971, the City Council passed Local Law 54 that named this site as Macri Square, in honor of Luigi A. Macri (1909–1962), a resident of Williamsburg who died in 1962. Macri was a dedicated member of the nearby American Legion Post 1751, which maintained the Second World War memorial inside this park.
