= Raoul Wallenberg Forest =

Park in the Bronx, NYC

- Location: Bronx, New York
- Coordinates: 40°53′15″N 73°55′04″W
- Elevation: 138 ft
- Etymology: named after Raoul Wallenberg
- Status: Open

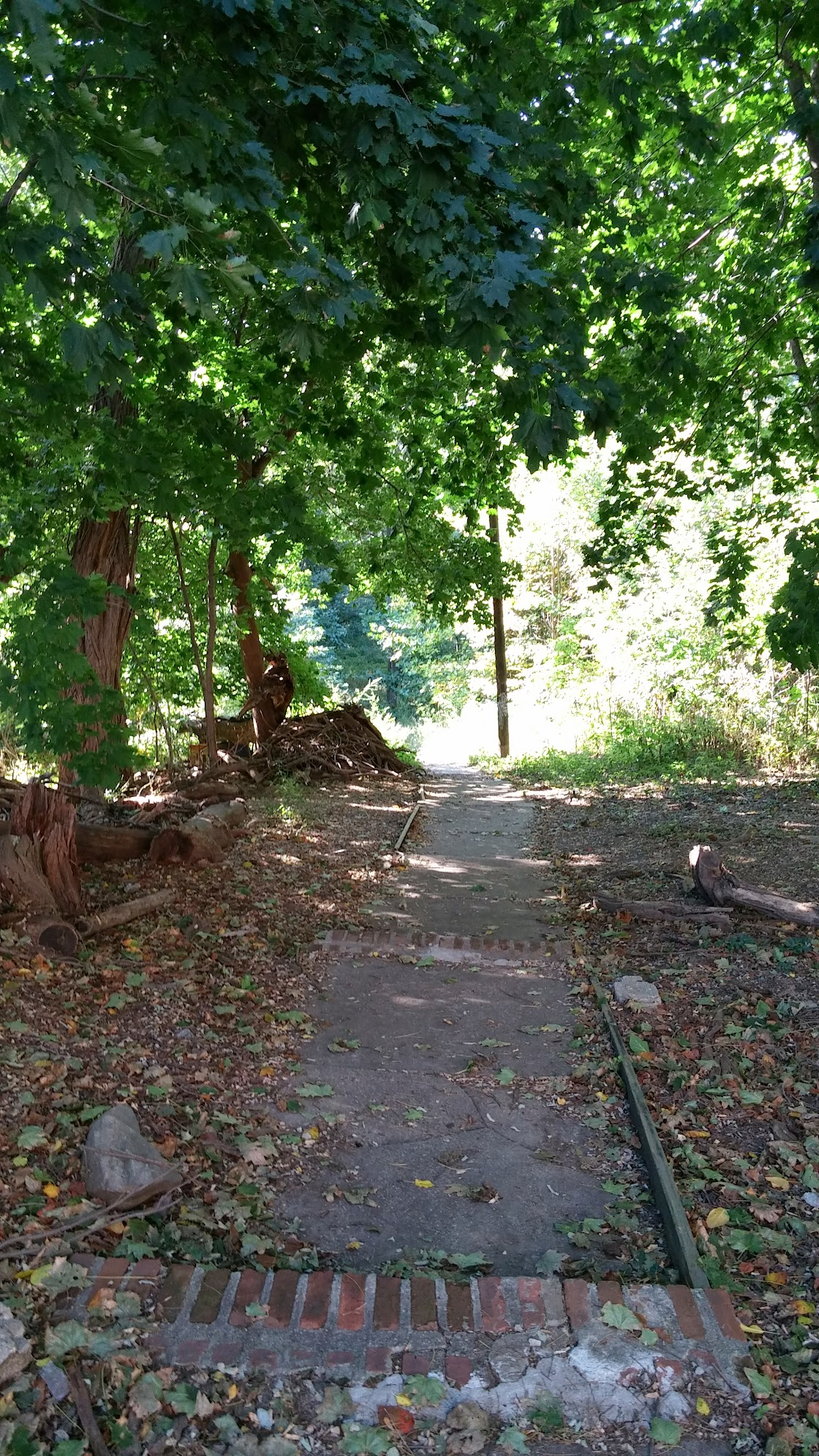

Raoul Wallenberg Forest is a New York City park located in Riverdale, New York named after Raoul Wallenberg, a Swedish diplomat who saved thousands of Hungarian Jewish people.
