= Finn Square =

Square in Manhattan, New York

- Location within New York City
- Type: Pocket park
- Location: Manhattan, New York City, U.S.
- Coordinates: 40.71880753048164°N 74.00683675406145°W
- Public transit: Franklin Street

Finn Square is a small triangular public green space in the Tribeca neighborhood of Lower Manhattan, New York City. It is located at the intersection of Varick Street, West Broadway, and Franklin Street.

== Description ==
The garden occupies approximately 0.1 acres (0.04 hectares). Its landscaping includes thornless honey locust trees, flowering plants, shrubs, grasses, and seasonal bulbs. The garden also contains benches and paved areas. Its location beside a low-rise Con Edison facility allows it to receive more sunlight than some of the surrounding streets in Tribeca.

Finn Square has periodically hosted public art installations. Sculptor Richard Serra's work T.W.U. was installed on West Broadway between Leonard and Franklin streets in 1981–1982, in the vicinity of the square. The site has also hosted works by sculptor Bill Barrett, including 9/11, an approximately 11-foot-tall bronze sculpture displayed for six months in 2011. NYC Parks has identified the paved areas of the square as suitable locations for temporary art exhibitions.

== History ==
=== Creation and naming ===
Finn Square was formed during a municipal street-improvement project in 1919. The construction of a subway line beneath Varick Street led to the widening of the street to approximately 100 feet and its extension southward to connect with West Broadway. The extension required the removal of several buildings and created a triangular space at the intersection. The resulting changes also altered the surviving buildings along the square's perimeter.

In 1919, the New York City Board of Aldermen named the space after Private Philip Schuyler Finn, who was killed in action in France on March 7, 1918, during World War I. Finn had grown up in the neighborhood, and his death prompted the dedication of the square in his memory.

=== Association with Daniel E. Finn ===
The square is also associated with Philip Finn's father, Daniel E. Finn (1845–1910), commonly known as “Battery Dan.” He was a Democratic politician and Tammany Hall leader active in Lower Manhattan. Daniel Finn became known for opposing proposals to construct commercial piers along Battery Park, arguing that the waterfront open space was important to the densely populated neighborhood. He later served as a city magistrate and police judge, beginning in 1904.

Although Finn Square was officially named for his son, the elder Finn's local political legacy became closely associated with the site.

=== Design and redevelopment ===
For much of the 20th century, Finn Square remained an undeveloped, concrete-paved traffic island.

In April 1998, the square was transformed into a garden through the Greenstreets program, a joint initiative of the New York City Department of Parks and Recreation and the Department of Transportation. Established in 1986 and revived in 1994, the program sought to convert underused traffic islands and other paved spaces into landscaped areas. City workers planted trees, while neighborhood volunteers contributed flowers and helped maintain the garden. NYC Parks subsequently designated Finn Square as a Greenstreet in 1999.
