= Travers Park =

Public park in Queens, New York

Coordinates: 40.75373°N 73.88929°W

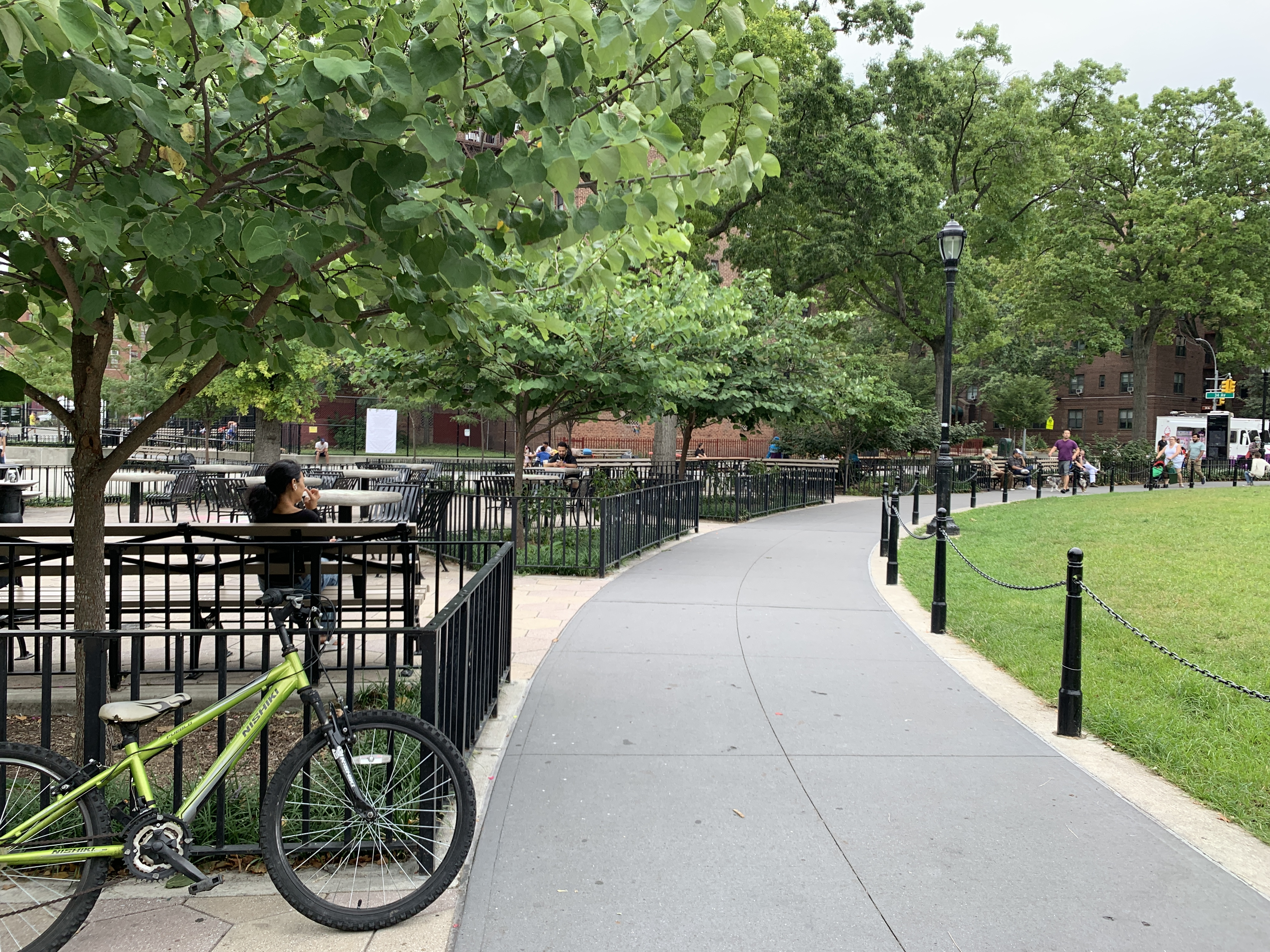
- Interactive map of Travers Park
- Type: Community park
- Location: Jackson Heights, Queens, New York City

Travers Park is a 2-acre (8,100 m^{2}) community park and playground in Jackson Heights, Queens, New York City. It is located between 77th and 78th Streets, on the north side of 34th Avenue. More than half of the park is occupied by an asphalt play area, with basketball and tennis courts. A children's playground with leaf-and-vine shaped spray shower occupies about one third of the park. There are also restroom facilities, handball courts, a dog run, picnic tables, a bicycle rack, benches, tables, and a lawn. In 2012, a segment of adjacent 78th Street was transformed into a permanent Street Plaza; the sports area of a nearby school was also bought by New York City and added to the park.

Travers Park is a heavily used park. It is located in City Council District 25, which ranks 50th out of 51 Council Districts in the city in terms of park space, according to the nonprofit group New Yorkers for Parks; the only Council district in the city with less park space is on Manhattan's Upper East Side, near Central Park.

== History ==
In April 1948 the City of New York acquired land for Travers Park by condemnation. The park was named in honor of Jackson Heights community leader Thomas J. Travers, and dedicated on July 26, 1949.

The park underwent a major renovation in the mid-1990s, vastly improving what had been a badly neglected playground. A series of green planting areas were created through the northern half of the park that still flourish today. Many of the shrubs, perennials and fencing protecting them are the work of Friends of Travers Park, which continues to maintain the plantings and provides community input to the New York City Parks Department.

A movement to expand the park started in 2007. Related to this effort was the closing of neighboring 78th Street traffic from July to November in 2008 and 2009. The street functioned as a play street. The play street project was a joint effort by several organizations, including the Friends of Travers Park, JH Green Alliance, and the Western Jackson Heights Alliance. The intention was to seek the closing of the street in 2009 to coincide with the presence of Green Market. In 2010, after organizing a march to Queens Community Board 3 to request their support, the organizing groups were granted permission to close 78th Street to traffic for the entire months of July and August. In August 2012 a section of 78th Street adjacent to the park was permanently closed to traffic and transformed into a pedestrian plaza, effectively adding a 10,000-square-foot area to Travers Park. This plaza is managed by the Jackson Heights Green Alliance who are responsible for the maintenance and overseeing the events that take place on the plaza. In February 2013, NYC Parks and the NYC Department of Citywide Administrative Services completed the acquisition of a 24,600-square-foot asphalt play yard formerly owned by the Garden School at 33-16 79th Street, and added the land to Travers Park. That year, the children's playground was renovated again. The playground became fully Americans with Disabilities Act (ADA)-compliant and is appropriate for children aged 5 to 10 years old.

As of March 2018, Travers Park and Staunton Play Field is being renovated and expected to reopen in late 2019. A large portion of the park reopened in February 2019. The tot lot at Travers Park is set to be rebuilt by late 2020. During this renovation, there was a controversy about the opening of a Mazda car dealership next to the park. Original plans had called for the entirety of 78th Street next to the park to be turned into a car-free zone, but a 200-foot section remained to provide access to Koeppel Mazda, which opened in 2018.

In June 2022, one of the handball courts was converted into a dog run.

When the 34th Ave Open Street plan was redesigned in 2022 (dubbed "Paseo Park"), the Department of Transportation envisioned Travers Park to form the "green core of the neighborhood."

== Rory Staunton Field ==
Across 78th Street from Travers Park is the .57-acre Rory Staunton Field, a former school yard of The Garden School that was transferred to the city's Parks Department in 2013. Rory Staunton (1999-2012) was a resident of Sunnyside Gardens and a student at The Garden School in Jackson Heights who was active in a variety of civic causes until his sudden diagnosis of infection that led to his untimely death from septic shock. Staunton’s death helped to inspire the New York State Department of Health to implement protocols in all New York hospitals to better identify and treat sepsis, and the creation of the Rory Staunton Foundation to educate the public about this infection, which is usually treatable if quickly diagnosed.

== Activities ==
The Jackson Heights Greenmarket, a farmer's market, opens on Sundays year-round in the park. Since 2004, Travers Park has been home to Summer Sundays in the Park, a performance series that features a wide range of music, both in style and ethnicity. The series includes a musical produced by Theater for the New City, and a show by the Swedish Cottage Marionettes, based in Central Park. The series is sponsored by the Jackson Heights Beautification Group, its committee, Friends of Travers Park, and beginning in 2008, the Queens Community House. It will be funded in 2009 largely through grants from the Queens Council on the Arts, which had provided funding for several of the earlier editions.

On a sunny spring or summer day it is not unusual to see multiple activities occurring in Travers Park or Rory Staunton Field, such as bicycle riding, cricket, baseball, softball, soccer, tennis, and basketball. There is also a handball and a full-court basketball court. There is a place for toddlers, a section for a few waterworks and tables for checkers or chess.
