= Willowbrook Park =

Public park in Staten Island, New York

Coordinates: 40°36′09″N 74°09′28″W

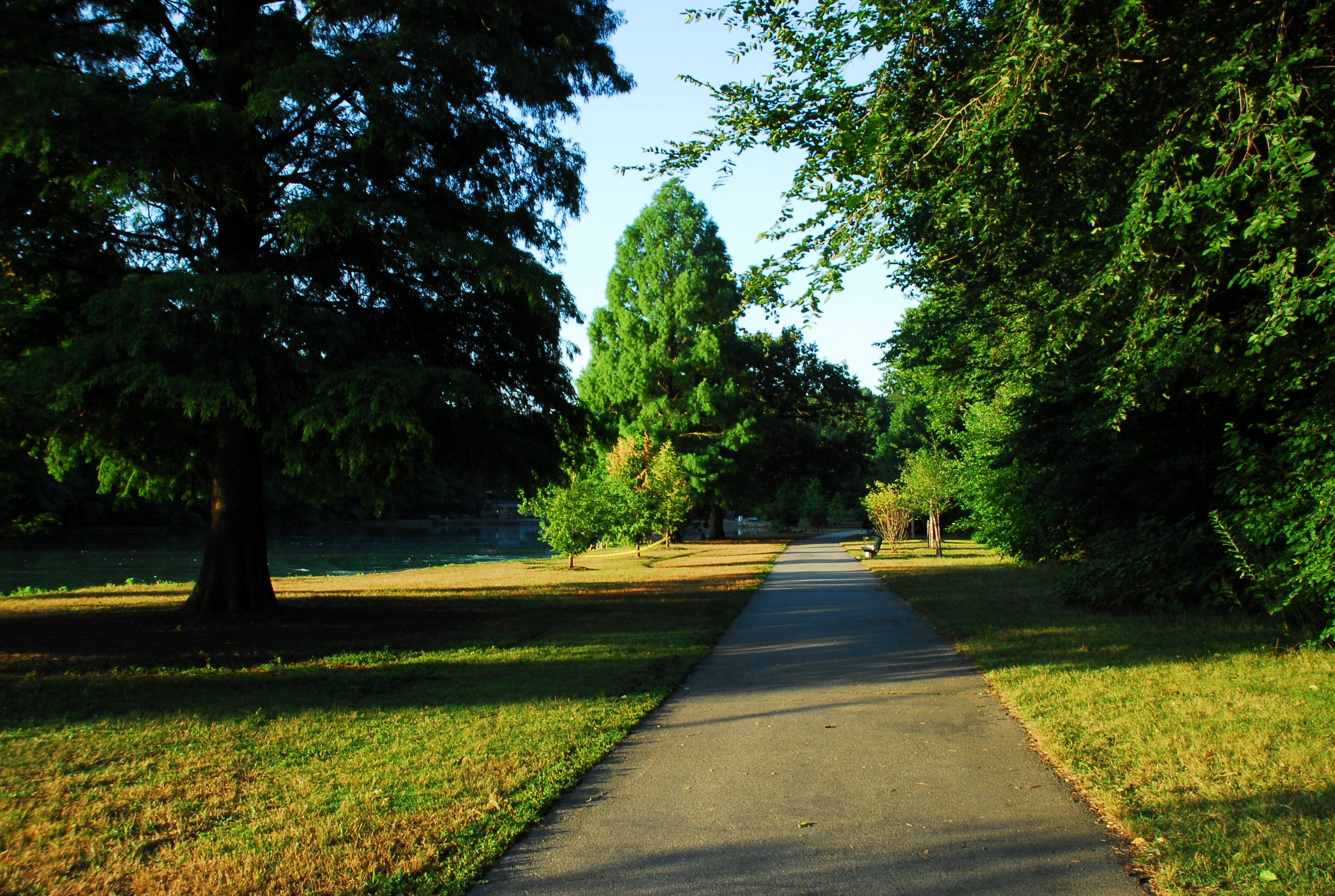
Willowbrook Park

Willowbrook Park is a recreational park in Willowbrook, Staten Island, New York City, within the Staten Island Greenbelt. The 164-acre (0.66 km^{2}) public park provides baseball fields, a playground, and a pond. A carousel was opened in 1999. The former Staten Island Hotel can be seen from the park.

== Willowbrook Lake ==
Willowbrook Lake is housed in Willowbrook Park and provides the pastime of fishing to park visitors. Some species located in this lake are the brown bullhead, largemouth bass, carp, and bluegill.
