= Montefiore Square =

Public park in New York, New York

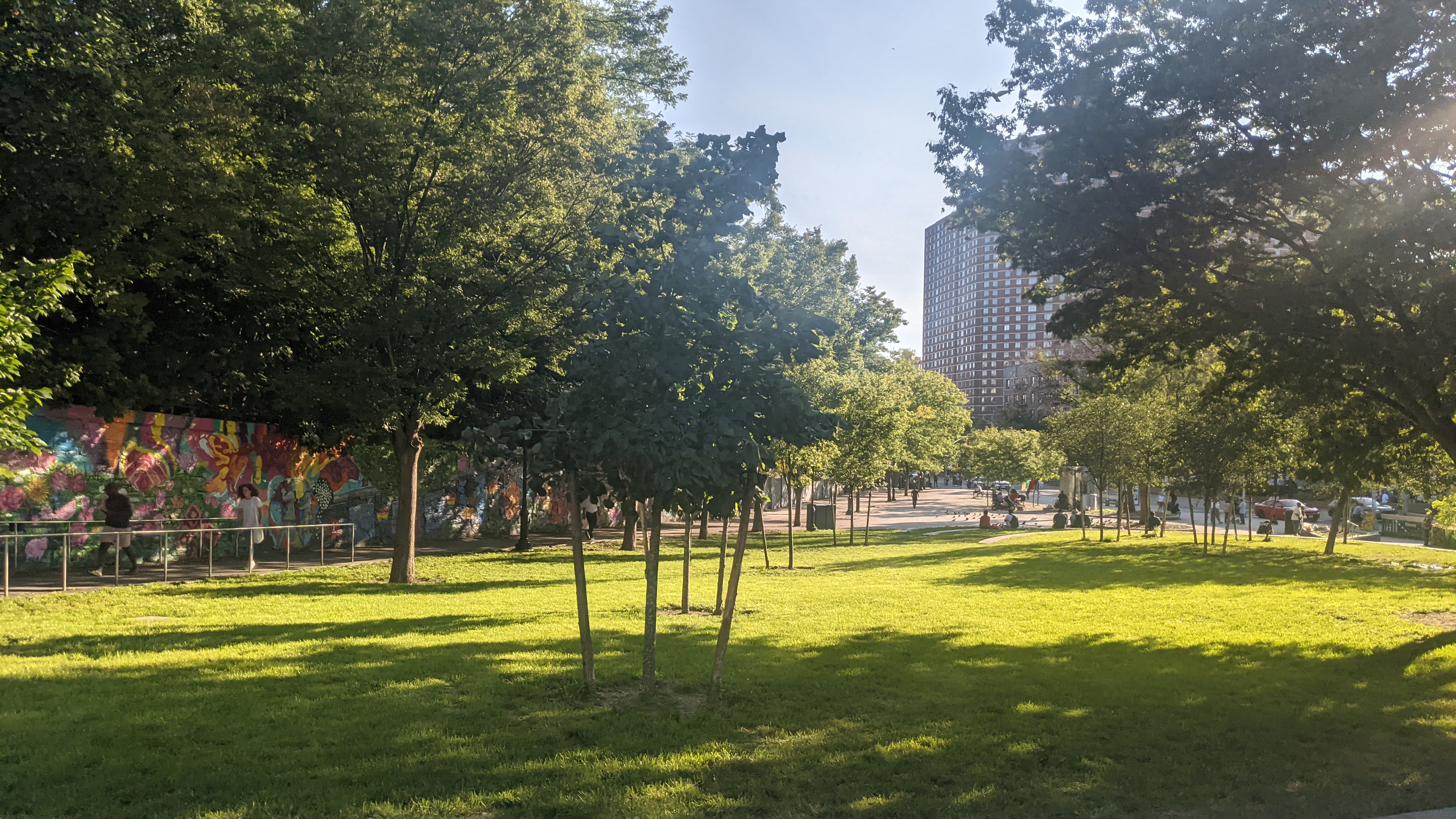
- Montefiore Square from its northern entrance. August 31, 2023.
- Interactive map of Montefiore Square
- Location: Hamilton Heights, New York, NY
- Coordinates: 40°49′17.688″N 73°57′13.104″W
- Area: 0.34 acres (0.14 ha)
- Created: 1906
- Operator: New York City Department of Parks and Recreation, Montefiore Park Neighborhood Association
- Open: 24 hours
- Status: open

Montefiore Square is a 0.34-acre public park in the Hamilton Heights neighborhood of Manhattan in New York City. The park is operated by the New York City Department of Parks and Recreation in conjunction with the Montefiore Park Neighborhood Association. Montefiore Square is of the triangle or plaza park type, and is bordered by Broadway to the west, and the intersection of West 138th Street and Hamilton Place to the north. It abuts the 137th Street–City College station of the 1 train. It has a sloping grassy field with stone seating, a large paved plaza and a garden.

== History ==
=== Before condemnation: 1825-1905 ===
The land on which the park now lies was part of a 35-acre (14 ha) farm purchased by John A. Meyer in 1825, which was eventually split into lots and auctioned off. In 1884, the Hebrew Orphan Asylum of New York was built on the south side of West 138th Street bounded by Hamilton Place to the west and Amsterdam Avenue to the east. The orphanage closed in 1941, and the land is now occupied by the east side of Montefiore Square and a middle school campus including a playground.

The Montefiore Home for Chronic Invalids, was initially situated at East 84th Street and Avenue A moved to the corner of West 138th Street and Broadway (then "Boulevard") in 1888. This institute was conceived by representatives of New York's Jewish community and was named in honor of its first contributor, the Jewish philanthropist Moses Montefiore.

=== Early days of the park: 1906-1993 ===
The wooded and unoccupied triangle of land between West 138th Street, Boulevard and Hamilton Place was condemned by the parks department in 1906. This triangle constituted the whole of Montefiore Park from its inception and through a renovation in 1993. It was named Montefiore Park after the neighboring sanitarium, which moved to the Bronx in 1910. Following several name changes, it is now known as Montefiore Medical Center.

=== Park redesign and renovation: 1994-present ===
In 1994, the Montefiore Park Neighborhood Association (MPNA) was founded as a volunteer group with the vision of revitalizing the park and its surrounding area. According to the MPNA, the area housed "illicit activity," as well as garbage dumps and graffiti which volunteers from the organization helped to clean. Alongside this physical maintenance, the MPNA (in tandem with the New York City Department of Transportation Plaza Program) drafted an expansion and redesign of the park.

In October 2019, the renovation of Montefiore Square was announced. In 2020, traffic through the portion of Hamilton Place between West 138th Street and Broadway was permanently shut down and renovation began on the park. The renovations, which cost $18.4 million, were completed in January 2022. It consisted of three main features: a paved plaza for markets and live events, a garden, and a grassy field with stone seating. The closed roadway was repurposed as a pedestrian walkway, and a small triangle of land to the old roadway's east was also acquired making for the park's current 0.34-acre (0.14 ha) area.
