= Julio Carballo Fields =

Public park in the Bronx, New York

Coordinates: 40°48′57″N 73°53′21″W

Julio Carballo Fields is a park in the Hunt's Point section of The Bronx, New York City. Originally called Manida Park, it was renamed in 1997 to honor Julio Carballo (1950–1996), who ran a neighborhood youth baseball program in the 1970s and 1980s. The park was originally constructed in 1992 as a temporary field for baseball and softball games, and transferred to the New York City Department of Parks in 1993. At the time, it was one of only three parks in Hunt's Point.

The park underwent a $1 million renovation starting in 2006. At that time, the ball fields were reconstructed, landscaping done and play equipment, a spray shower, and picnic area were installed. The renovation was completed in 2008 at an ultimate cost of $2 million, with the project marred by a contractor bribery scandal.
