= Charlie's Place =

Historic Myrtle Beach supper club

Charlie's Place in Myrtle Beach, South Carolina, was a supper club on Carver Street where African-American entertainers such as Ray Charles, Little Richard, Otis Redding, Billie Holiday and Ella Fitzgerald performed. The club was on the Chitlin' Circuit where Blacks could perform in the segregated South from the 1930s to the 1950s, and it was torn down in the 1960s. It was listed in the Green Book. Next door was the motel called the Fitzgerald Motel or the Whispering Pines, where Black people stayed because of segregation. The club itself has been gone for years. The south side of the motel was torn down in September 2016, but as of August 2017, plans called for improvements to the north side of the motel that would make it look like it did years ago. Businesses, meeting space and a gift shop would go in another area. A documentary by Betsy Newman of South Carolina ETV won a Southeast Regional Emmy Award in June 2019.

== History ==
Charlie Fitzgerald and his wife Sarah opened Charlie's Place in 1937. After he died in 1955, she continued to run the place for about ten years.

Charlie Fitzgerald was one of the richest Black people in Myrtle Beach. Herbert Riley said Fitzgerald (a.k.a. Lucious Rucker) made sure the venue was as nice as anyplace in Myrtle Beach, except for Ocean Forest Hotel. Fitzgerald was so respected he lent money to white people, and was believed to have eaten in white restaurants and sat in the white section of the Broadway Theater. A few white people visited the club and learned dances which they also did at the Myrtle Beach Pavilion. It has been suggested that the Shag dance originated at Charlie's Place. Cynthia Harrell, who worked there, was nicknamed "Shag".

Unlike many African-American establishments of the time, said Dino Thompson in his 2014 book Boogie Woogie Beats, Charlie's Place was not a "barrelhouse" but was "[c]rafted out of heart-cypress, with "starch-shirt waiters, classy coiffed hostesses, pomaded dance couples and boasted ... swing and boogie royalty."

Whites and blacks could listen to music together and dance with no problem, but opponents considered the practice "dangerous" and the Horry County sheriff warned that this should not be happening. On August 26, 1950, about 60 members of the Ku Klux Klan fired 500 rounds of ammunition into Charlie's Place. One Klan member, a Conway police officer, was killed, and the club's jukebox was shot. Fitzgerald threatened "bloodshed" and later, while holding a gun to protect his property, was dragged away and beaten and his ear was marked. "Shag" Harrell and two others were seriously injured. Frank Beacham, who wrote a book about Charlie's Place, said the Klan acted "to kill the rise of Black music." White people stayed away from the club after that. Fitzgerald was believed to have died July 4, 1955, at age 49, and his wife Sarah Fitzgerald took over. The club operated until the late 1960s and was torn down.

Fitzgerald owned the Fitzgerald Motel opened in 1948 at 1420 Carver Street in the Booker T. Washington neighborhood of Myrtle Beach, also called "The Hill". Little Club Bamboo and the Patio Casino were also located there.

== Preservation efforts ==
In 2015 Riley asked the city to buy the former motel in order to turn it into a museum. The Carver Street neighborhood that used to be considered Black Hollywood had become rundown, beginning with the end of segregation when Black people could go where they wanted. The site of Charlie's Place was just a grass lot beside the motel. The city wanted to revitalize the entire area. The Myrtle Beach Colored School already had an exhibit about Charlie's Place.

In October 2017, the second row of motel rooms was to be converted to business incubators, museum space and a police substation. The incubator program began in 2021 and as of June 2022 Naomi Productions had units occupied. A business license was required as well as a commitment of one year.

A state historic marker went up in 2018.
