= QC =

QC may refer to:

== Places ==
- Quebec, a Canadian province
  - Quebec City, its capital
- Quezon City, Philippines
- The Quad Cities, an American metropolitan area along the Mississippi River
- QualiEd College, a Hong Kong high school

== Arts and entertainment ==
- Quake Champions, a 2017 FPS video game
- Quality Control Music, an American record label (launched 2013)
- Questionable Content, a webcomic by Jeph Jacques (launched 2003)

== Science and technology ==
=== Computing ===
- QuakeC, a scripting language in the computer game Quake by ID Software
- Quantum computing, a type of computation
- Quantum cryptography, a variety of cryptography employing quantum mechanics or quantum computers
- Quartz Composer, a node-based visual programming language
- Quick Charge, a technology for managing power delivered over USB
- .qc subdomain in .qc.ca
- QC Record Format, a New Zealand standard of information interchange format for financial transactions

=== Other uses in science and technology ===
- Quantum chemistry
- ATCvet code QC, a class of veterinary medicines
- Quantum cascade, a technique used in a quantum cascade laser

== Other uses ==
- Quality control, in business
- Quebec Central Railway, Canada (1869–2006)
- Queen's Counsel, a type of lawyer in Commonwealth countries
- QuietComfort, a Bose headphones brand
- Quota Count system, an aircraft noise limit

== See also ==
- Q100 (disambiguation)
- QCS (disambiguation)
