= Bacho =

Bacho may refer to:

== Given or family name ==
- Bacho Akhalaia (born 1980), Georgian politician
- Bacho Kiro (1835–1876), Bulgarian revolutionary
- Peter Bacho, American writer

== Other ==
- Bacho district, amphoe in Thailand
- Bacho Kiro cave, Bulgarian cave
- Bacho Kiro High School, Bulgarian school
- Bacho Kiro Peak, peak in Antarctica
- BACHO (payment standard), data format for New Zealand bank transfers

== See also ==
- Bachos, France
- Bahco, a Swedish hand tool brand
