= One Room Schoolhouse Park =

Public park in Queens, New York

Coordinates: 40.763562°N 73.87957°W

One Room Schoolhouse Park is a small park located on the southeast corner of Astoria Boulevard and 90th Street in the East Elmhurst neighborhood of Queens, New York City. Its name recalls the site of Queens's last one-room schoolhouse, demolished in 1934. The schoolhouse was built only five years after New York State required compulsory education for children in 1874. Last called P.S. 10, the school was also known as the Bowery Bay School, after an earlier school established in 1734, and as the Frogtown School. Frogtown was a poor community located in a swampy area north of Astoria Boulevard, near the present-day LaGuardia Airport. Emma Fagan headed the school from 1879 to 1910. The 15-by-28-foot (4.6 by 8.5 m) classroom had capacity for fifty-two students divided into six classes. The six rows of desks were arranged according to the age and ability of the students. The beginners were seated at the smaller desks in the front, while the more advanced students occupied the back rows. In the center of the classroom, a stove with a pipe extending to the roof that kept the space warm during winter.

By 1910, the expanding needs of immigrant populations and the reform movement that created the public education system had rendered one-room schoolhouses obsolete. The schoolhouse closed in 1925, but a temporary school building was still in use at the site when Parks acquired the 0.14-acre (570 m^{2}) property from the Board of Education in 1934. Increased population in the neighborhood necessitated the construction of a new playground that opened to the public in December 1935. Subsequent decades saw the playground transformed into a sitting area. In 2015, the City Council allocated funding for the restoration of this park. The redesign of the park will commence following informational sessions to incorporate public input on the park’s features. Work on the renovation started in 2019.
