= East Elmhurst, Queens =

Neighborhood in New York City

East Elmhurst
- Neighborhood of Queens
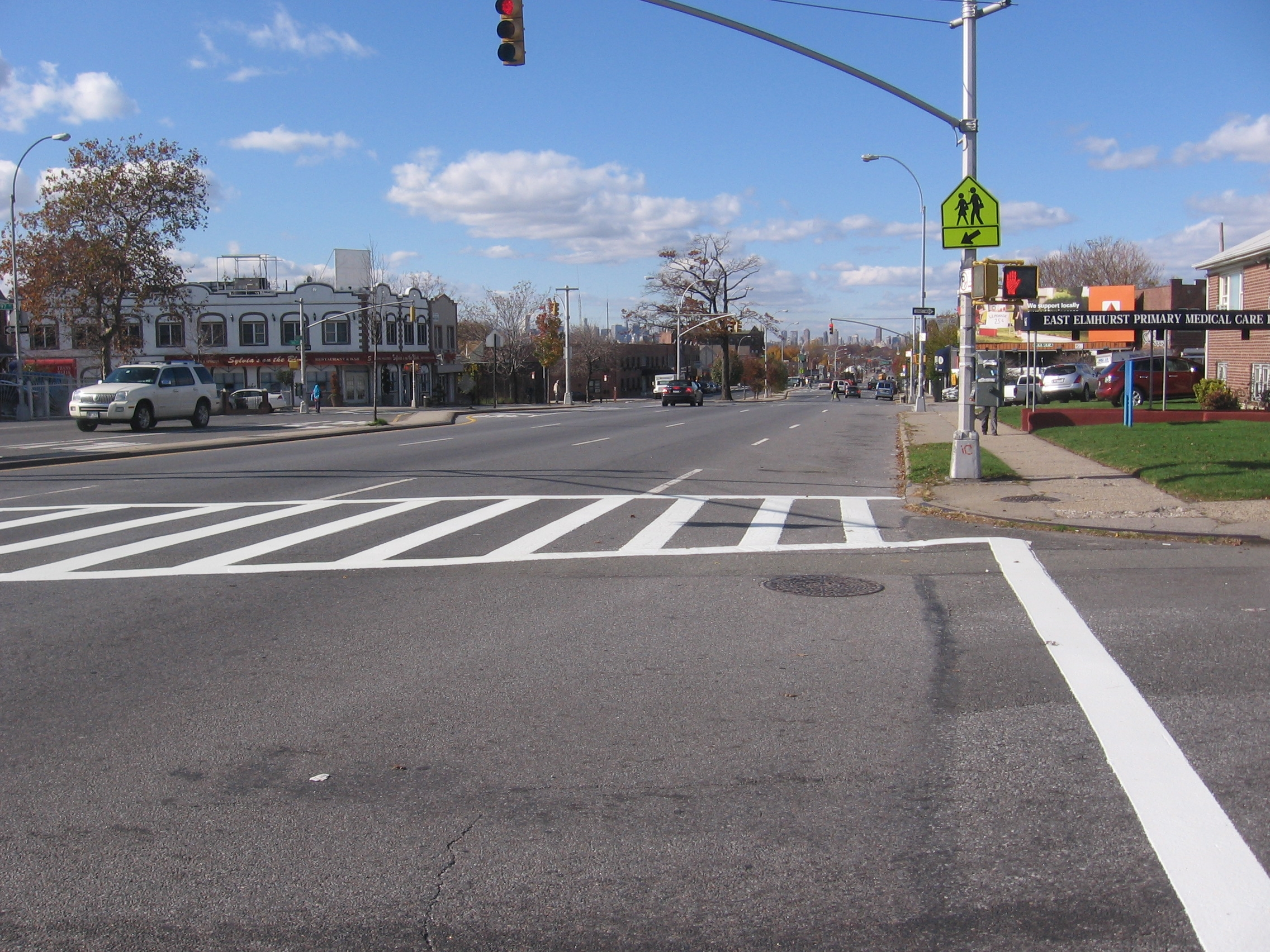
- Astoria Boulevard, a wide boulevard that serves East Elmhurst
- Location within New York City; Note: red area overlaps with Jackson Heights.
- Coordinates: 40.761°N 73.865°W
- Country: United States
- State: New York
- City: New York City
- Borough: Queens
- Community District: Queens 3

Area
  - Total: 0.693 sq mi (1.795 km^{2})

Population (2010)
  - Total: 23,150
  - Density: 33,400/sq mi (12,900/km^{2})

Race/Ethnicity
  - Hispanic: 63.5%
  - Black: 25.4%
  - White: 4.7%
  - Asian: 4.4%
  - Other/Multiracial: 2.1%
- Time zone: UTC−5 (EST)
  - Summer (DST): UTC−4 (EDT)
- ZIP Code: 11369, 11370, 11371
- Area codes: 718, 347, 929, and 917

East Elmhurst is a residential neighborhood in the northwest section of the New York City borough of Queens. It is bounded to the south by Jackson Heights and Corona, to the north and east by Bowery Bay, and to the west by Woodside and Ditmars Steinway. The area also includes LaGuardia Airport, located on the shore of Flushing Bay, the LaGuardia Landing Lights Fields, and Astoria Heights (the latter two in ZIP Code 11370).

East Elmhurst is part of Queens Community District 3 and its ZIP Codes are 11369, 11370, and 11371. The neighborhood is patrolled by the New York City Police Department's 115th Precinct, though the airport is patrolled by the Port Authority Police Department. East Elmhurst and its southern neighbor Corona are often referred to jointly as "Corona/East Elmhurst".

== History ==
From colonial times to the early 1900s, the area now known as East Elmhurst was a vast marsh named Trains Meadow. Urbanization at the turn of the century was creating a New York City housing shortage and urban sprawl. In 1909, Edward A. MacDougall's Queensboro Corporation bought 325 acres (132 ha) of undeveloped land and farms to the south and christened them Jackson Heights after John C. Jackson, a descendant of one of the original Queens families and a respected Queens County entrepreneur.

The neighborhood formerly contained an amusement area along Bowery Bay Beach (later renamed North Beach), which started operating in 1886. An amusement park called Gala Amusement Park was built by William Steinway on the Bowery Bay in what is now present-day LaGuardia Airport. In the 19th century, the area used to be called Frogtown before Steinway rebuilt the area. It was home to the East Coast's first Ferris wheel and was known as the "Coney Island of Queens." Gala Amusement Park was eventually shut down due to Prohibition. In 1929, it was razed and transformed into a 105-acre (42 ha) private flying field named Glenn H. Curtiss Airport after the pioneer Long Island aviator, later called North Beach Airport. Starting in 1937, a Works Progress Administration project transformed North Beach Airport into LaGuardia Airport, which formally opened in 1939.

The first houses were built in 1905. These residences were small frame houses located on 40-by-100-foot (12 by 30 m) lots, and some houses on the bay contained private beaches. The neighborhood's first commercial development came to Ditmars Boulevard during World War II.

In 1929, Holmes Airport opened near the western section of East Elmhurst. Bordering St. Michaels Cemetery to the west, the airfield was also called the Grand Central Air Terminal and Grand Central Airport. Holmes Airport shut down in 1940, one year after LaGuardia Airport opened. Today, the site is part of the Bulova Corporate Center and residential homes that surround the area.

The neighborhood saw an influx of African American residents in the 1960s and 1970s, as it was one of the few areas of the city where they could buy homes.

In September 2021, remnants of Hurricane Ida severely flooded the neighborhood of East Elmhurst and all surrounding areas. After surveying hurricane damage in New Jersey, President Joe Biden flew to East Elmhurst and toured one of the many residential common driveway inundated by the storm. Near the 87th Street alleyway, Biden met with local representatives and residents, and he delivered remarks on the response to Hurricane Ida in Queens.

== Geography ==
The boundaries of East Elmhurst, as with most other New York City neighborhoods, are imprecise and often disputed, but the name generally applies to the area directly south of LaGuardia Airport. A more expansive definition considers East Elmhurst to be bordered by the Brooklyn Queens Expressway (BQE) and 70th Street on the west, Northern Boulevard on the south, and Flushing Bay on the north and east. According to the Encyclopedia of New York City, the section west of Junction Boulevard and south of Astoria Boulevard is excluded from East Elmhurst.

== Demographics ==
Based on data from the 2010 United States census, the population of East Elmhurst was 23,150, an increase of 1,967 (9.3%) from the 21,183 counted in 2000. Covering an area of 443.53 acres (179.49 ha), the neighborhood had a population density of 52.2 inhabitants per acre (33,400/sq mi; 12,900/km^{2}).

The racial makeup of the neighborhood was 4.7% (1,092) White, 25.4% (5,869) African American, 0.2% (46) Native American, 4.4% (1,023) Asian, 0.1% (14) Pacific Islander, 0.6% (146) from other races, and 1.2% (269) from two or more races. Hispanic or Latino people of any race were 63.5% (14,691) of the population.

According to the 2020 census data from New York City Department of City Planning, there were between 20,000 and 29,999 Hispanic residents while each the White, Black, and Asian residents all were each less than 5000 residents.

In 2011, the median move-in year for residents of one census tract in East Elmhurst was found to be 1974, the oldest of any of the more than 2,000 census tracts in the city.

=== Police and crime ===
East Elmhurst is patrolled by the 115th Precinct of the NYPD, located at 92–15 Northern Boulevard. The 115th Precinct was ranked 20th safest out of 69 patrol areas for per-capita crime in 2010. Crime has declined significantly since the late 20th century when the area was known as the "cocaine capital" of New York City.

The 115th Precinct has a lower crime rate than in the 1990s, with crimes across all categories having decreased by 82.5% between 1990 and 2018. The precinct reported 3 murders, 41 rapes, 248 robberies, 368 felony assaults, 195 burglaries, 653 grand larcenies, and 149 grand larcenies auto in 2018.

== Arts and culture ==
=== Residents ===
During the 1950s and 1960s, the area was home to many African American musicians, civil rights leaders, professionals, and athletes including Malcolm X, Dizzy Gillespie, Nat Adderley, Louis Armstrong, Jimmy Heath, Frankie Lymon, Charlie Shavers, Ella Fitzgerald, and Willie Mays. During the late 1960s and early 1970s. numerous New York Mets such as Ed Charles and Tommie Agee called East Elmhurst home. East Elmhurst is the childhood home of former U.S. Attorney General Eric Holder and Queens Borough President Helen Marshall. Jazz vocalist Norman Mapp also lived in East Elmhurst.

=== Nepali community ===
The intersection of 75th Street and 31st Avenue in East Elmhurst was co-named "Mount Everest Way" on March 9, 2019, to celebrate the Nepali American community in the western part of East Elmhurst, Jackson Heights, and Woodside areas.

=== Places of worship ===
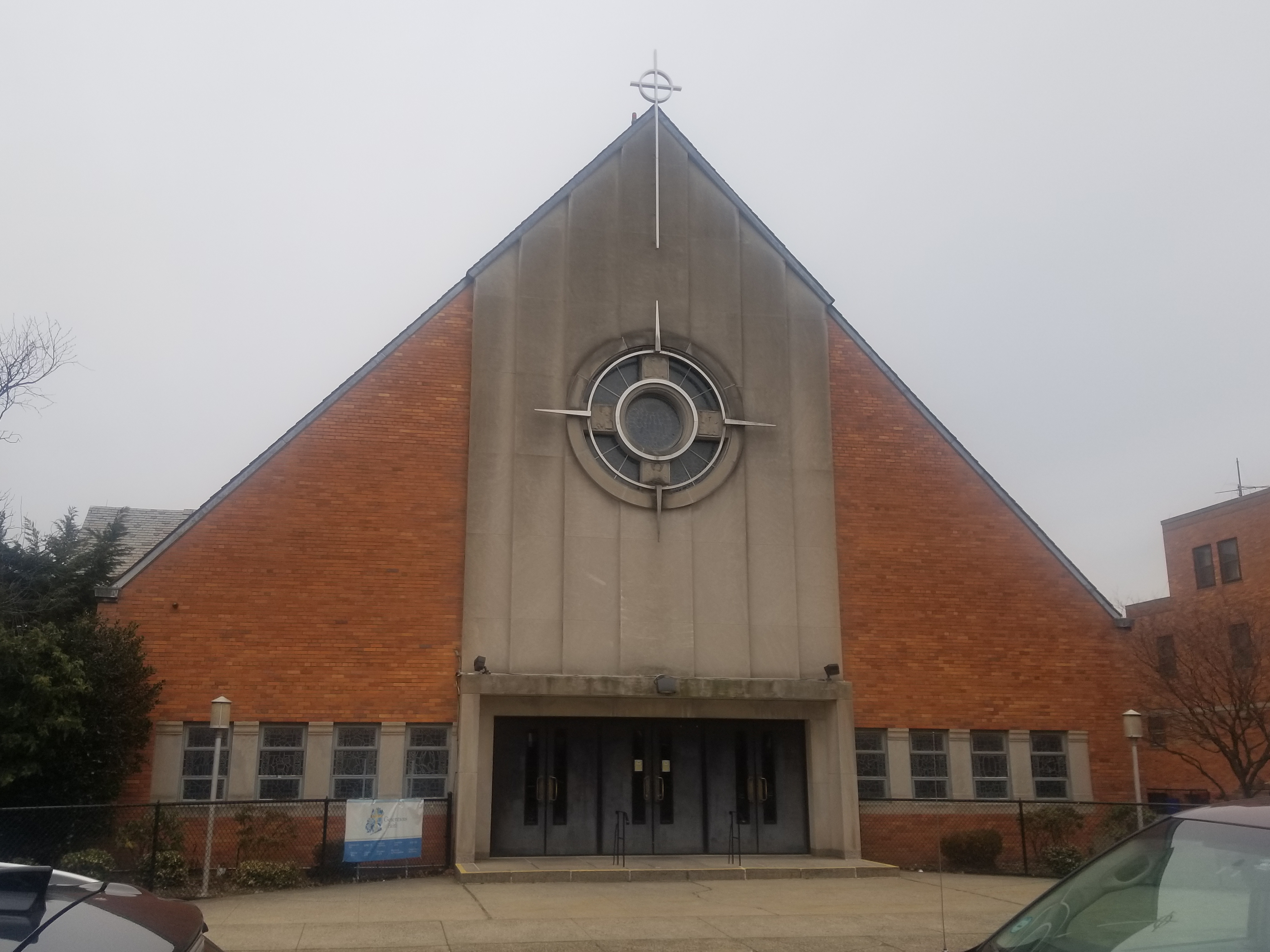
The 80th Street main entrance of Our Lady of Fatima Church in East Elmhurst

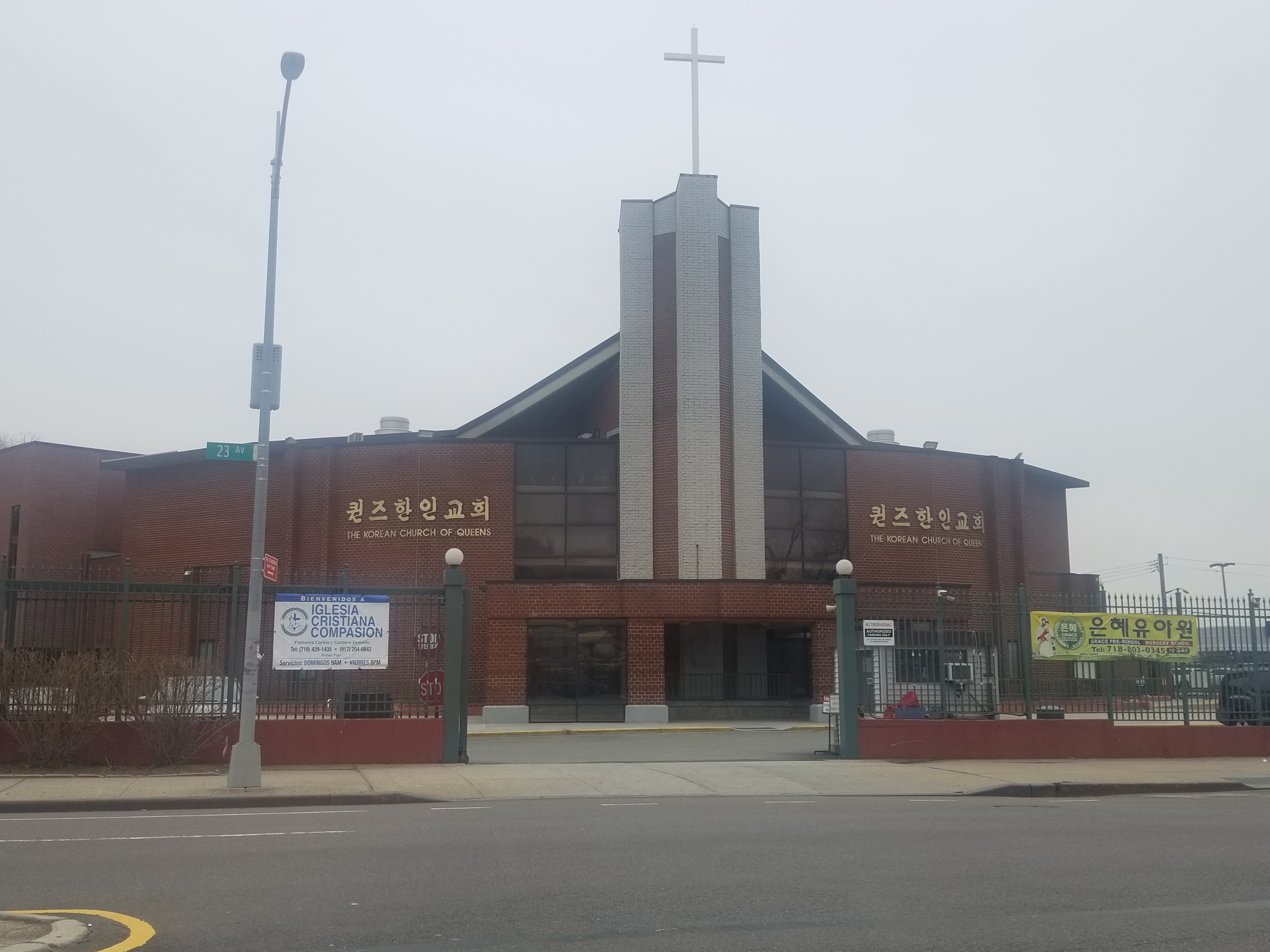
The Korean Church of Queens on 23rd Avenue

- Our Lady of Fatima Roman Catholic Church, A Roman Catholic church in the western part of East Elmhurst
- First Baptist Church, located along Astoria Boulevard
- Masjid Abu Huraira, a mosque in the western part of East Elmhurst
- St. Gabriel Roman Catholic Church, a Roman Catholic church in the eastern part of East Elmhurst
- The Episcopal Church of Grace and Resurrection, on 32nd Avenue
- The Korean Church of Queens, a Korean church in the northern part of East Elmhurst
- SDMS Shiva Mandir, a Hindu temple in the eastern part of East Elmhurst. It is primarily attended by Hindu Indo-Caribbean Americans (especially Indo-Trinidadians and Tobagonians) and was one of the first Hindu temples in New York City, as well as one of the first Indo-Caribbean Hindu temples in the United States. It was founded in 1980 from the Sanatan Dharma Maha Sabha of the West Indies Inc. group and its current building was inaugurated in 1987 with a congregation going back to the 1960s.

=== Notable landmarks and structures ===
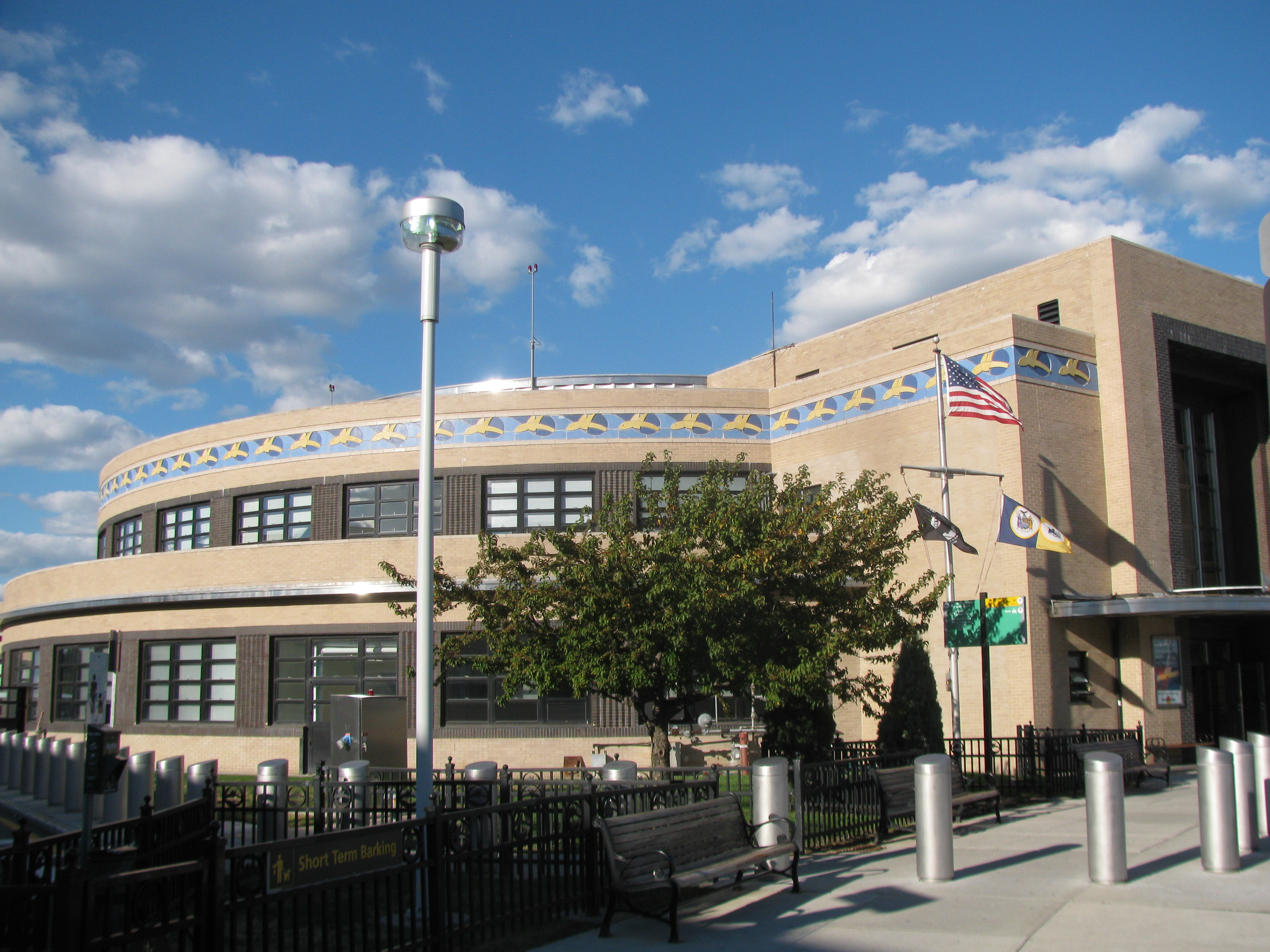
Marine Air Terminal (Terminal A) at LaGuardia Airport, East Elmhurst

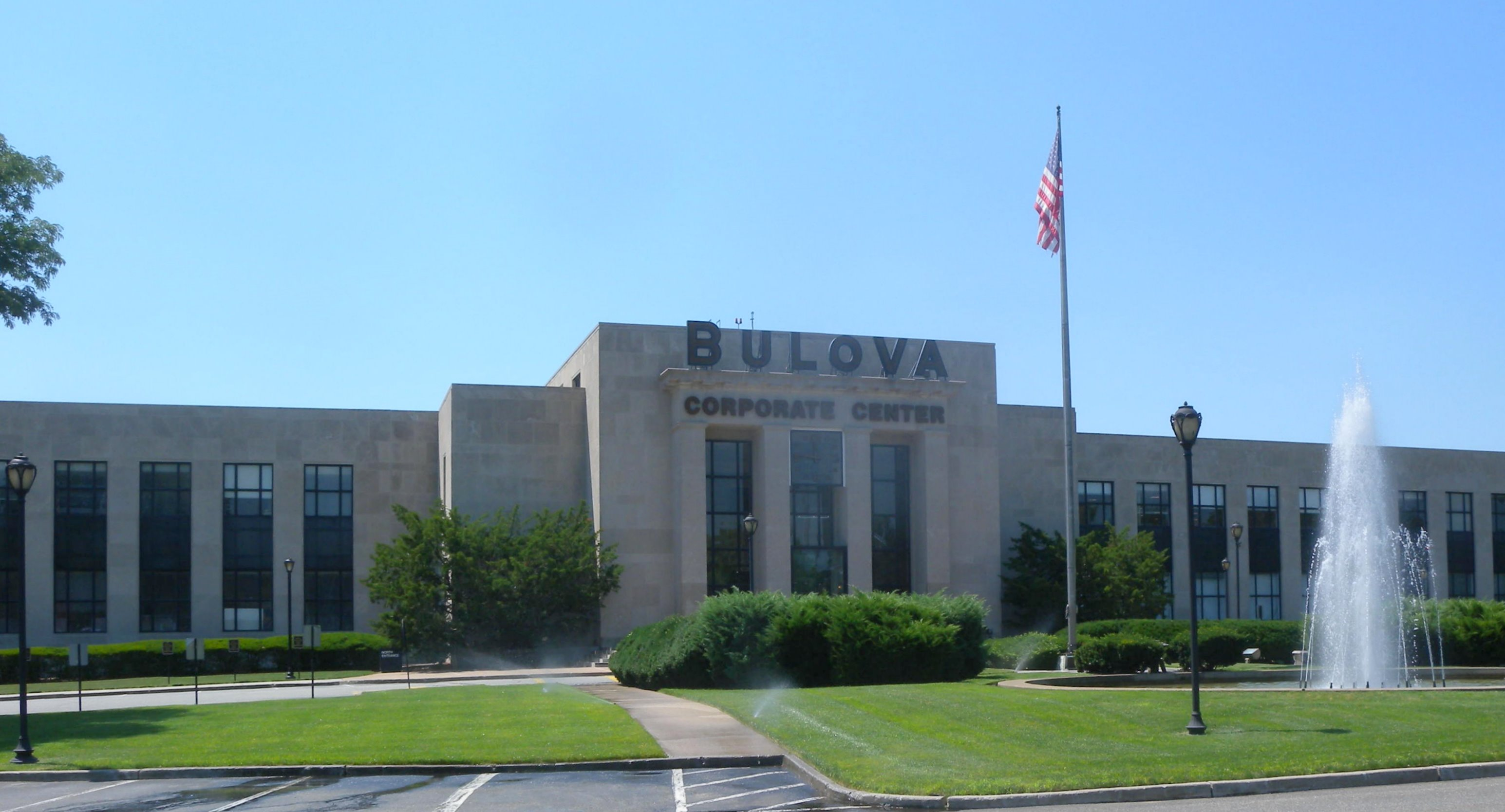
Bulova Corporate Center from Astoria Boulevard near 77th Street

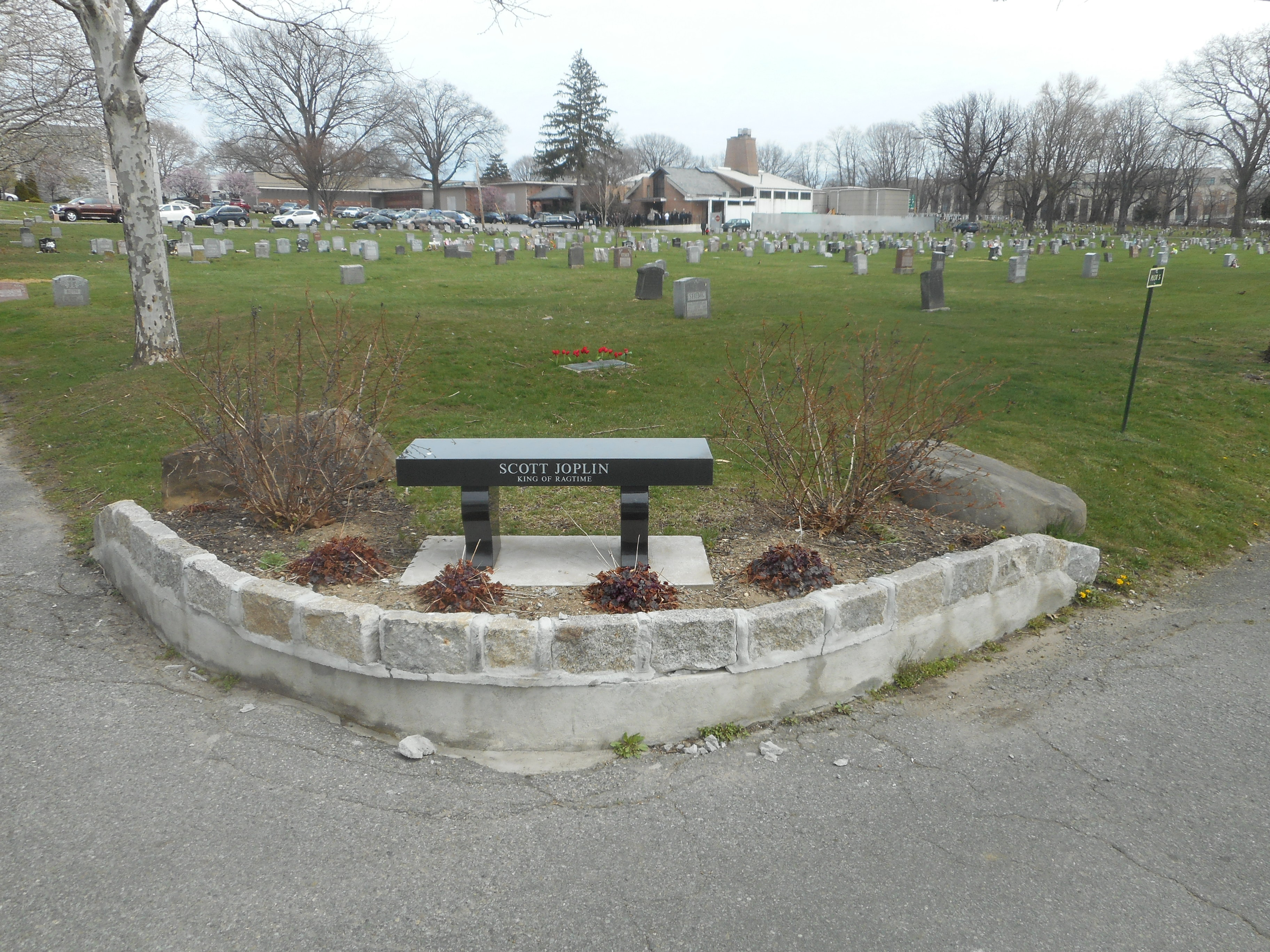
The grave of music composer and pianist Scott Joplin in St. Michael's Cemetery

- The Marine Air Terminal in LaGuardia Airport is a New York City designated landmark on the National Register of Historic Places.
- Bulova Corporate Center was the original headquarters of the Bulova Watch Company. It was redesigned as an office center, and contains the New York City Department of Correction headquarters.
- The Lent Homestead and Cemetery is a historic house and cemetery in the Astoria Heights section of East Elmhurst. It was listed on the National Register of Historic Places in 1984.
- St. Michael's Cemetery, a triangular cemetery surrounded by the Brooklyn-Queens Expressway and Grand Central Parkway

== Parks and recreation ==
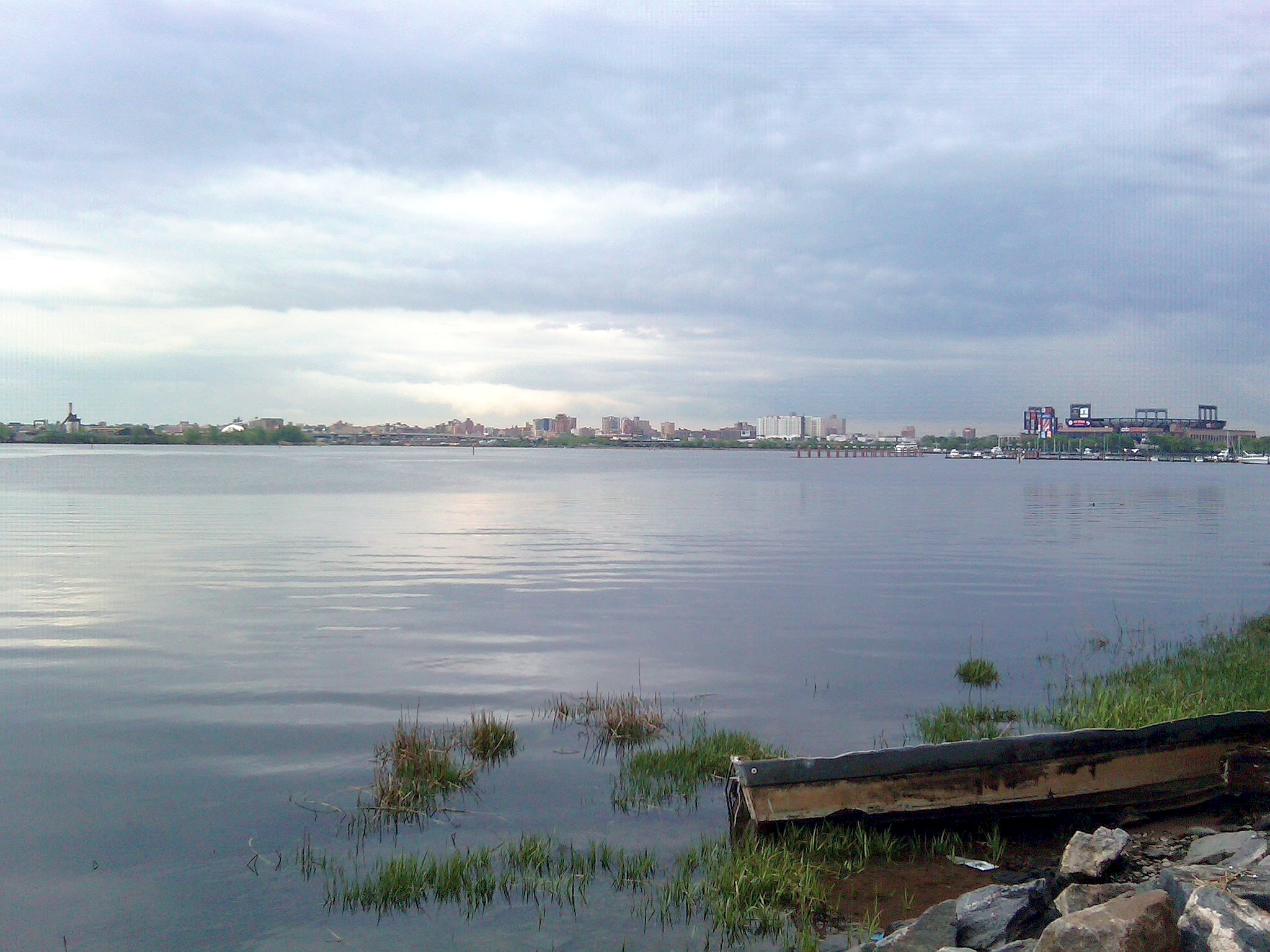
Flushing Bay from the Flushing Bay Promenade

- Louis C. Moser (formerly known as Bulova Park) Playground
- Gorman Playground
- LaGuardia Landing Lights Fields
- Flushing Bay Promenade (renamed to Malcolm X Promenade)
- Planeview Park
- East Elmhurst Playground
- There is also a park named "One Room Schoolhouse Park", named after the last one-room schoolhouse in Queens. The school was at Astoria Boulevard and 90th Street from 1879 to 1934; it became a playground in 1935 and a garden in 1992.

== Government ==
Politically, East Elmhurst is represented by parts of the 21st (Shanel Thomas-Henry), 22nd (Tiffany Cabán), and 25th Districts (Shekar Krishnan) in the New York City Council.

In the New York State Legislature, East Elmhurst in the State Senate is part of District 13 with Jessica Ramos as current senator. In the State Assembly, the lower half of the legislature, East Elmhurst is a part of District 34 (Assemblywoman Jessica González-Rojas) and District 35 (Assemblywoman Larinda Hooks).

== Education ==
=== Public schools ===
New York City Department of Education operates District 30 public schools in the area. P.S. 127 Aerospace Science Magnet School is an elementary school for grades PK-8. East Elmhurst Community School serves students PK-3. Also in East Elmhurst is the application school, I.S. 227 Louis Armstrong Middle School (grades 5–8), for Queens residents. A small section of the neighborhood is zoned for a separate district in Whitestone, causing some children to attend P.S. 21 for elementary and J.H.S 185 for middle school.

=== Private schools ===
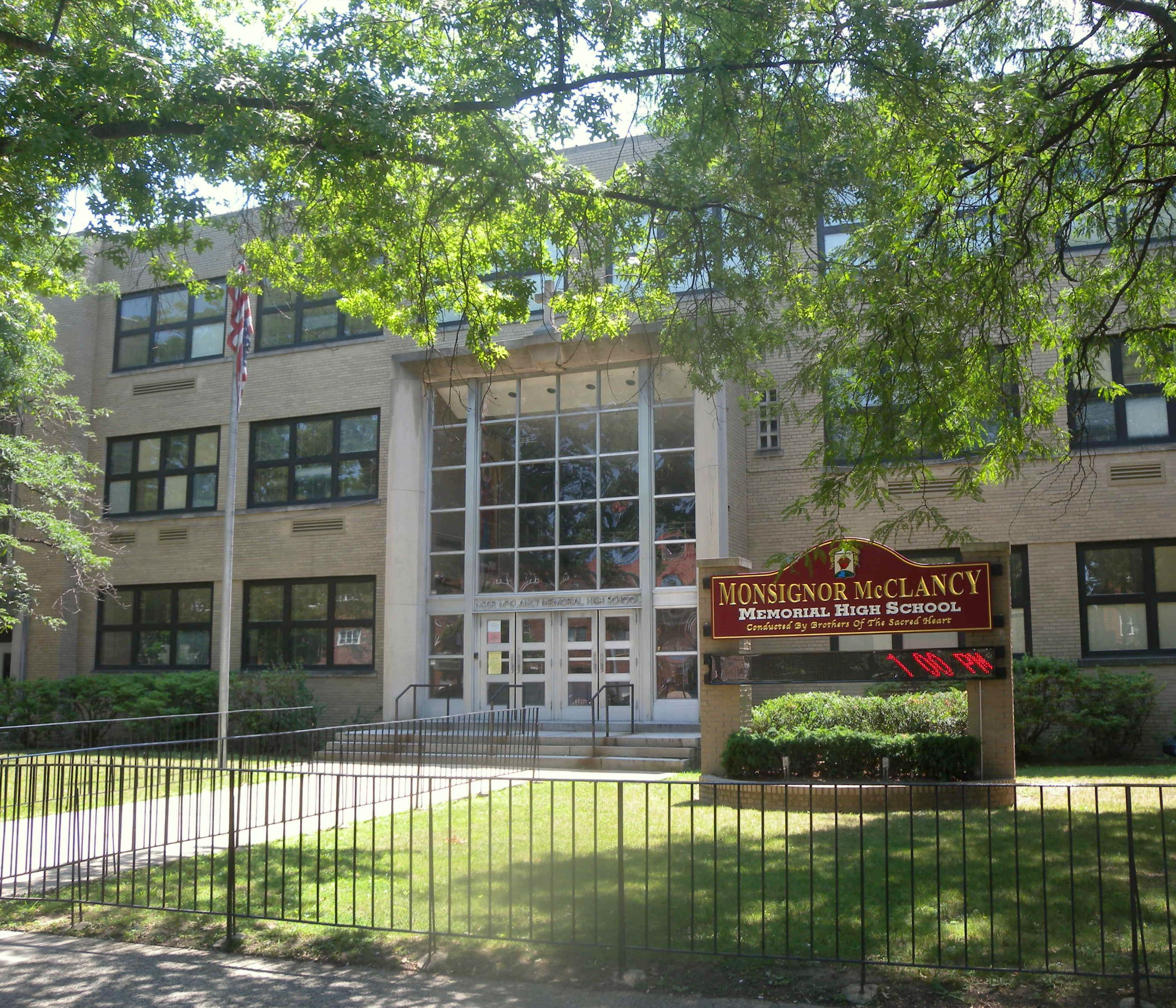
Monsignor McClancy Memorial High School along 31st Avenue in East Elmhurst

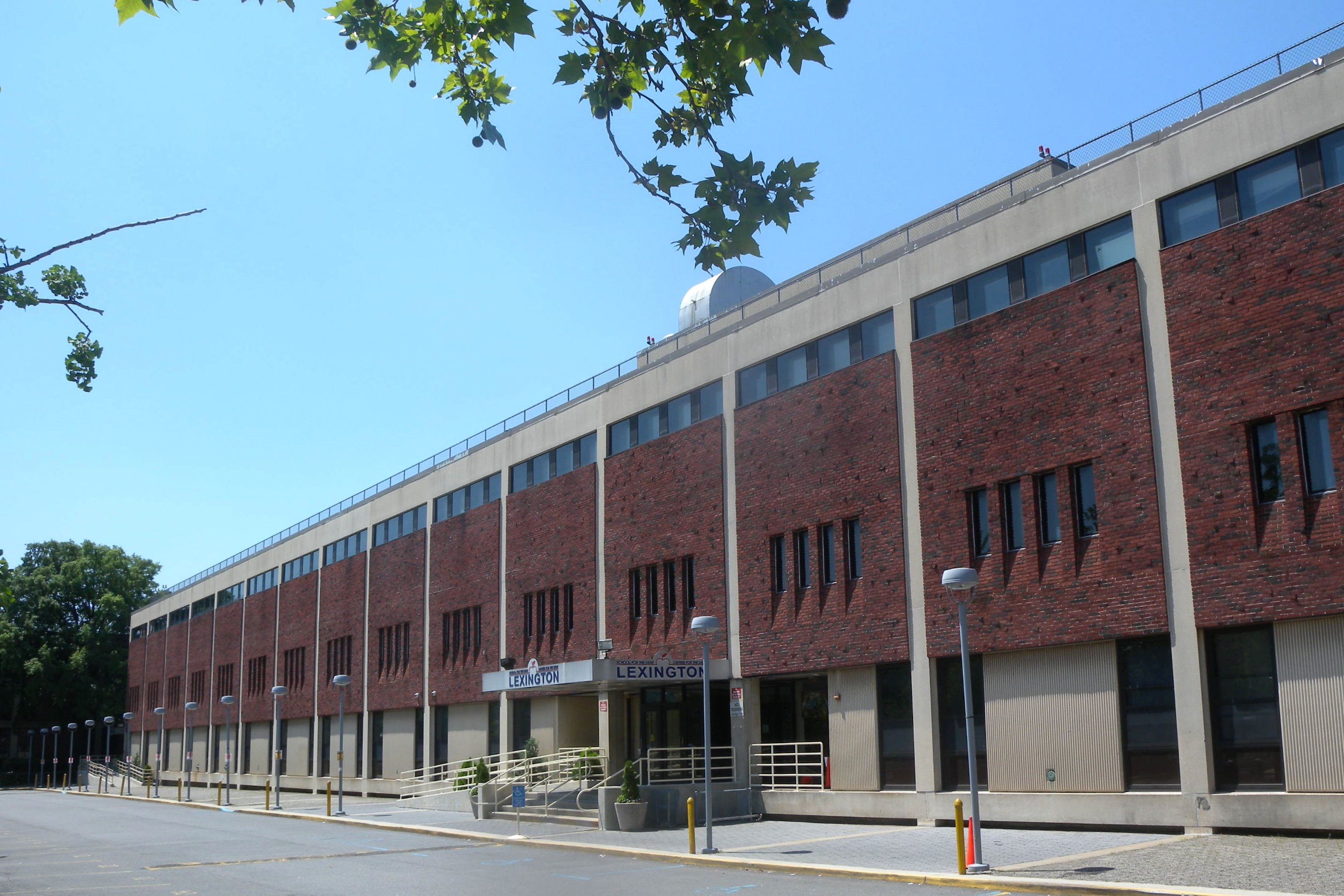
Lexington School and Center for the Deaf from 75th Street in East Elmhurst

- Our Lady of Fatima School – a Catholic school for nursery to 8th Grade
- Monsignor McClancy Memorial High School – a Catholic high school
- Lexington School and Center for the Deaf – the oldest and largest school for the deaf in New York. The school is state-supported.

=== Colleges ===
East Elmhurst is home to Vaughn College of Aeronautics and Technology located at 86–01 23rd Avenue, abutting Grand Central Parkway.

=== Other ===
The Langston Hughes Community Library and Cultural Center, "conceived and designed by the residents of the Corona-East Elmhurst community", houses one of the most extensive collections of African American art and literature. A component of the Queens Library system, the Langston Hughes Community Library and Cultural Center, is located in Corona on Northern Boulevard. The Black Heritage Reference Center, a part of the Langston Hughes Community Library and Cultural Center, serves Queens with a comprehensive reference and circulating collection, totaling approximately 30,000 volumes of materials written about and related to Black culture.

== Media ==
The Corona East Elmhurst News, first published in 1959 by Kenneth and Corien Drew, was located on Astoria Boulevard. It ultimately became the Queens Voice and was published from 1959 to 2002. The tabloid-style newspaper was a weekly publication which included many notable columnists that highlighted the social and political activities of the African American communities of Corona and East Elmhurst and the Borough of Queens.

== Transportation ==
=== Public transit ===
There are no New York City Subway stations nearby, but MTA Regional Bus Operations' Q14, Q19, Q23, Q33, Q47, Q49, Q63, Q66, Q69, Q72, and M60 SBS buses serve East Elmhurst.

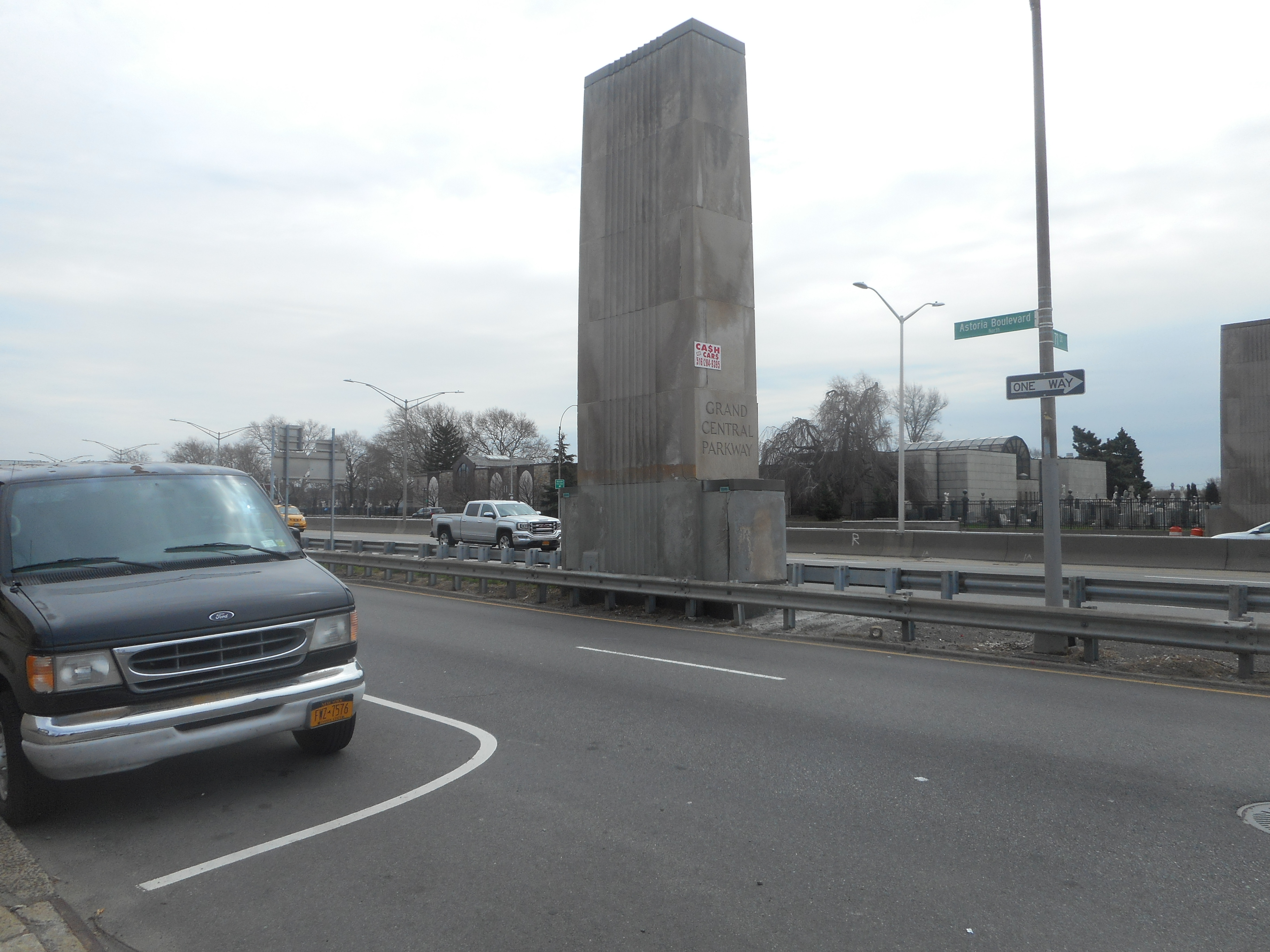
Pillars on the Grand Central Parkway aligned with 71st Street

=== Roads ===
Highways:

- Grand Central Parkway
- I-278 (Brooklyn-Queens Expressway, eastern leg)

Boulevards:

- Ditmars Boulevard
- Astoria Boulevard
- Northern Boulevard
- 94th Street (in East Elmhurst until Northern Blvd. going South; then it becomes Junction Boulevard from there).

Pedestrian overpass:

- 73rd Street Pedestrian Overpass Bridge – a pedestrian bridge over the Grand Central Parkway that connects Astoria Boulevard North in Astoria Heights to St. Michael's Cemetery and Q19 bus stop on Astoria Boulevard South.
- There are two Flushing Bay Promenade pedestrian footbridges, one via 27th Avenue and the other via 31st Drive.

In Queens Community District 3, 11% of roads have bike lanes. The bike lanes in East Elmhurst include:

- 31st Avenue
- 32nd Avenue
- 81st and 82nd Streets
- 88th Street
- 27th Avenue to the Malcolm X Promenade

Co-named streets:

- Father Eugene F. Donnelly Corner is located on the corner of 80th Street and 25th Avenue next to Our Lady of Fatima Parish. It was named after Father Donnelly who served as parish priest to the Our Lady of Fatima Parish community in East Elmhurst for 42 years. The street co-naming event took place on September 21, 2013.
- Marcellus Matricciano Way is located on the corner of 75th Street and 30th Avenue. It is a tribute to Marcellus Matricciano who was killed in the terrorist attack of September 11, 2001.
- Mount Everest Way is located on the corner of 75th Street and 31st Avenue. Installed in 2019, it is a tribute to growing Nepalese community here in East Elmhurst and the surrounding neighborhoods of Jackson Heights and Woodside.
- Emma Brandt Way is located on the corner of 74th Street and 30th Avenue. Installed in 2016, it honors longtime civic leader Emma Brandt, who was involved in many local organizations including the Elmhurst Hospital Advisory Board, the North Queens Homeowners Civic Association, and the Jackson Heights Beautification Group.
- Arthur Hayes Way is located on the corner of 32nd Avenue and 104th Street.
- Leverich Memorial Church Way is located on 32nd Avenue and 102nd Street near the Leverich Memorial Church. It was installed in 2009.

=== Airport ===
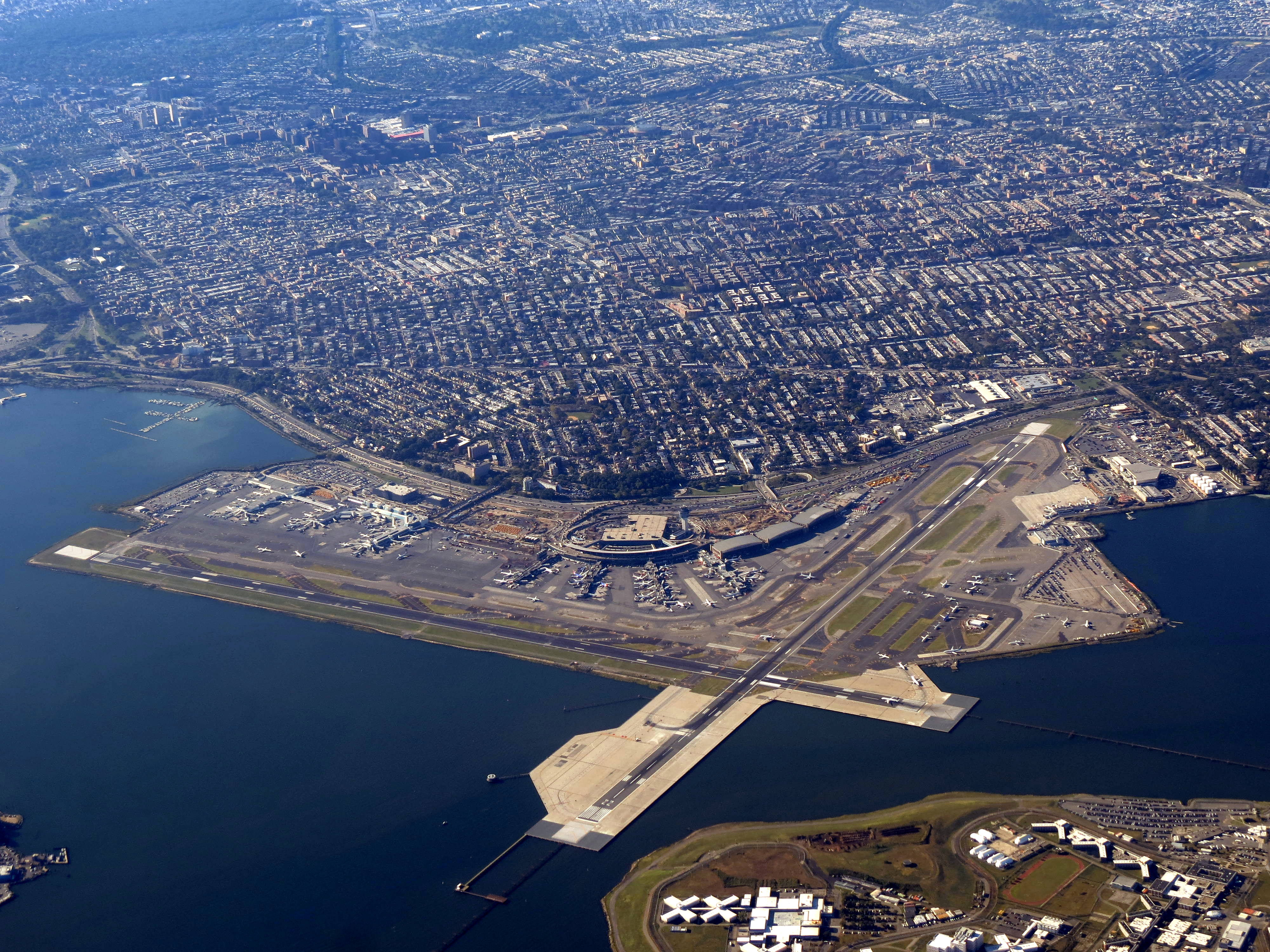
Aerial View of LaGuardia Airport

LaGuardia Airport is also located in the neighborhood.

== Post offices and ZIP codes ==
East Elmhurst covers three ZIP Codes: 11369 (East Elmhurst east of 85th Street), 11370 (East Elmhurst west of 85th Street and the sub-neighborhood of Astoria Heights), and 11371 (LaGuardia Airport). The United States Post Office operates two locations in East Elmhurst:

- East Elmhurst Station – 91–07 25th Avenue
- Trainsmeadow Station – 75–77 31st Avenue

== Fire safety ==
East Elmhurst is served by two New York City Fire Department (FDNY) fire stations. Engine Co. 316 fire station is located at 27–12 Kearney Street and serves the eastern part of East Elmhurst. Another fire station, Engine Co. 307/Ladder Co. 154, is located at 81–19 Northern Boulevard in Jackson Heights and serves the western part of East Elmhurst.

== Health ==
The New York City Department of Health has a 2018 community health report on the Queens Community Board 3 district which includes East Elmhurst, Jackson Heights, and North Corona. As of 2018, preterm births are about the same in the district as in other places citywide, but births to teenage mothers are more common. In the district, there were 86 preterm births per 1,000 live births (compared to 87 per 1,000 citywide), and 27.9 births to teenage mothers per 1,000 live births (compared to 19.3 per 1,000 citywide). The East Elmhurst, Jackson Heights, and North Corona area has a high population of residents who are uninsured. In 2018, this population of uninsured residents was estimated to be 28%, which is higher than the citywide rate of 12%.

The concentration of fine particulate matter, the deadliest type of air pollutant, in the district is 0.0073 milligrams per cubic metre (7.3×10^{−9} oz/cu ft), lower than the city average. Thirteen percent of district residents are smokers, which is slightly lower than the city average of 14% of residents being smokers. In addition, 20% of residents are obese, 13% are diabetic, and 29% have high blood pressure—compared to the citywide averages of 20%, 14%, and 24% respectively. 26% of children are obese, compared to the citywide average of 20%.

Eighty-six percent of residents eat some fruits and vegetables every day, which is slightly lower than the city's average of 87%. In 2018, 72% of residents described their health as "good", "very good", or "excellent", lower than the city's average of 78%. For every supermarket in the area, there are 17 bodegas. The district also has two farmer's markets.

The nearest large hospital in East Elmhurst is the Elmhurst Hospital Center in Elmhurst.

=== Incidents ===
In 2020, the neighborhoods of Corona, East Elmhurst, Elmhurst, and Jackson Heights were most affected by the COVID-19 pandemic in New York City. As of August 10, these communities, with a cumulative 303,494 residents, had recorded 12,954 COVID-19 cases and 1,178 deaths. COVID-19 cases in East Elmhurst ZIP Codes 11369 and 11370 were among the highest of any ZIP Code in New York City.

== Notable people ==
- Hurby Azor, musician and hip-hop producer
- Harry Belafonte (1927–2023), singer-songwriter, actor, and activist
- Clive Bradley, musician
- Guy R. Brewer (1904–1978), politician
- Ed Burke, jazz musician
- Ed Charles, baseball player
- Charles "Honi" Coles (1911–1992), actor and tap dancer, best known for his role as Tito Suarez in the film Dirty Dancing
- Keith David, actor
- Michael DenDekker, former member of the New York State Assembly
- Ray Felix (1930–1991), professional basketball player who played in the NBA for the New York Knicks
- Bobby Hammond (born 1952), former running back who played in the National Football League for five seasons with the New York Giants and Washington Redskins before starting a career as a coach
- Steve Henderson, baseball player
- P. J. Hill, former NFL running back
- Eric Holder, 82nd United States attorney general
- Langston Hughes, writer and activist
- Kwamé, rapper
- Eric B., rapper
- Ron "Amen-Ra" Lawrence, record producer
- Christopher Martin, rapper and actor
- Alexandria Ocasio-Cortez, U.S. representative
- Christopher Reid, rapper, actor, and comedian
- Jackie Robinson, baseball player
- Qubilah Shabazz (born 1960), second daughter of Malcolm X and Betty Shabazz
- Charlie Shavers, jazz trumpeter and songwriter
- Howard Stern (born 1954), host of The Howard Stern Show.
- Johnny Thunders (1952–1991), of the New York Dolls.
- Malcolm X (1925–1965), African-American Muslim minister and human rights activist, whose home in East Elmhurst was firebombed in February 1965, a week before he was assassinated
