= Ditmars Boulevard =

Boulevard in Queens, New York

- Former name: Ditmars Avenue
- Namesake: Ditmars family
- Owner: City of New York
- Maintained by: NYCDOT
- Length: 3.9 mi (6.3 km); Split into two segments bisected by the Grand Central Parkway
- Location: Queens
- Postal code: 11105, 11369, 11370
- Nearest metro station: Astoria–Ditmars
- West end: Shore Boulevard in Ditmars
- Major junctions: Grand Central Parkway in East Elmhurst
- East end: Astoria Boulevard / 111th Street in East Elmhurst

Ditmars Boulevard, originally known as Ditmars Avenue, is a street located in northwest Queens, New York City. It is divided into two segments; one travels through the neighborhood of Ditmars, located within Astoria, and the other acts as a service road for the Grand Central Parkway near LaGuardia Airport in East Elmhurst.

== Route description ==
Ditmars Boulevard begins at an intersection with Shore Boulevard in Astoria on the banks of the East River, just north of Astoria Park. The road continues to the east until it reaches the western edge of LaGuardia Airport, terminating at an intersection with 81st Street, north of Bowery Bay Boulevard and near Marine Air Terminal.

Southeast of this intersection, on the other side of the Grand Central Parkway, the road begins again, as a continuation of a short segment of 86th Street (which itself begins at 23rd Avenue) in East Elmhurst. This segment is one-way eastbound, merging with the eastbound exit ramp of exit 6 on the Grand Central, which serves 94th Street. At 94th Street, a main arterial which provides access to and from the airport, the road becomes two-way. It provides an eastbound entrance ramp, and shortly intersects a traffic circle with 23rd Avenue that also provides an alternate entrance to the airport (closer to terminals C and D). Now taking a more southern direction, Ditmars continues east along the Grand Central and merges with an exit 8 offramp. Shortly after, Ditmars terminates at an intersection with Astoria Boulevard, continuing south as 111th Street for one more block before terminating at Northern Boulevard (NY 25A).

== History ==
The earliest Ditmars ancestor was Jan Jansen Ditmarsen (John the Son of John from Ditmars) who immigrated to America from Holstein in Germany. The first Ditmars settled in Dutch Kills about 1647. Ditmars Boulevard and the East River was the site of Dr. Dow Ditmars' home. The doctor, who died in 1860 at age 90, was held in high esteem by the community. A son, Abram Ditmars, later became the first Mayor of Long Island City in 1870. Later, Steinway and Sons, the piano manufacturer, had a final assembly factory on Ditmars Boulevard until the 1960s.

== Transportation ==
Ditmars Boulevard is served by the following public transportation modes:

- The Astoria–Ditmars Boulevard station is the last stop on the New York City Subway's BMT Astoria Line, served by the N and W trains. The approach to the Hell Gate Bridge is on a masonry viaduct over that station.
- The Q23 runs between 23rd Avenue and 31st Drive.
- MTA Bus's Q69 route runs on the western half of Ditmars Boulevard east of 21st Street. Service to Long Island City originates at 78th Street.
- New York City Bus's Q90 route operates along the eastern half of the corridor between Astoria Boulevard and either 102nd Street (toward LaGuardia Airport) or 94th Street (toward Flushing).
- Additional service east of Marine Terminal Road is provided by the Upper West Side-bound M60 and the Q33 in both directions.

== In popular culture ==
The boulevard is the location of Brett Weir's apartment in Jerky Boys: The Movie, as a symbol for moving up in the city.
