= Queens Community Board 3 =

Queens Community District 3 Queens Community Board 3
- Community district
- Country: United States
- State: New York
- City: New York City
- Borough: Queens
- Neighborhoods: list: Corona; East Elmhurst; Jackson Heights

Government
  - Type: Community board
  - Body: Queens Community Board 3
  - Chairperson: Edmund Rosenbaum
  - District Manager: Giovanna A. Reid

Area
  - Total: 3.0 sq mi (7.8 km^{2})

Population (2016)
  - Total: 180,562
  - Density: 60,000/sq mi (23,000/km^{2})

Ethnicity
  - African-American: 4.8%
  - Asian: 16.9%
  - Hispanic and Latino Americans: 66.7%
  - White: 10.0%
  - Others: 1.5%
- Time zone: UTC−5 (Eastern)
  - Summer (DST): UTC−4 (EDT)
- ZIP codes: 11368, 11369, 11370, and 11372
- Area codes: 718, 347, and 929, and 917
- Police Precincts: 115th (website)
- Website: queenscb3.cityofnewyork.us

The Queens Community Board 3 is a local government in New York City, encompassing the neighborhoods of Jackson Heights, East Elmhurst and North Corona, as well as LaGuardia Airport, in the borough of Queens. It is delimited by the Brooklyn-Queens Expressway to the west, the Grand Central Parkway to the north, Flushing Meadows Corona Park on the east, and Roosevelt Avenue on the south.
