= Q100 =

Q100 may refer to:

== Radio stations ==
- Q 100.7 FM, in Barbados
- WJTQ, in Pensacola, Florida, United States, known as Q100 from the mid-1970s until 1993
- WWWQ, in Atlanta, Georgia, United States
- WQON, in Grayling, Michigan, United States
- KXQQ-FM, in Henderson, Nevada, United States
- KRWQ, in Gold Hill, Oregon, United States
- WODE-FM, in Easton, Pennsylvania, United States, known as Q100 (WQQQ) from 1983 until 1989
- WWFN-FM, in Marion, South Carolina, United States
- WBGQ, in Morristown, Tennessee, United States
- KULL, in Abilene, Texas, United States, known as Q100 (KORQ) from 1974 until 1999

== Other uses ==
- Q100 (New York City bus)
- Al-Adiyat, the 100th surah of the Quran
- De Havilland Canada Dash 8 Q100 turboprop
