= Our Lady of Fatima Roman Catholic Church =

Our Lady of Fatima Church
- Our Lady of Fatima Roman Catholic Church
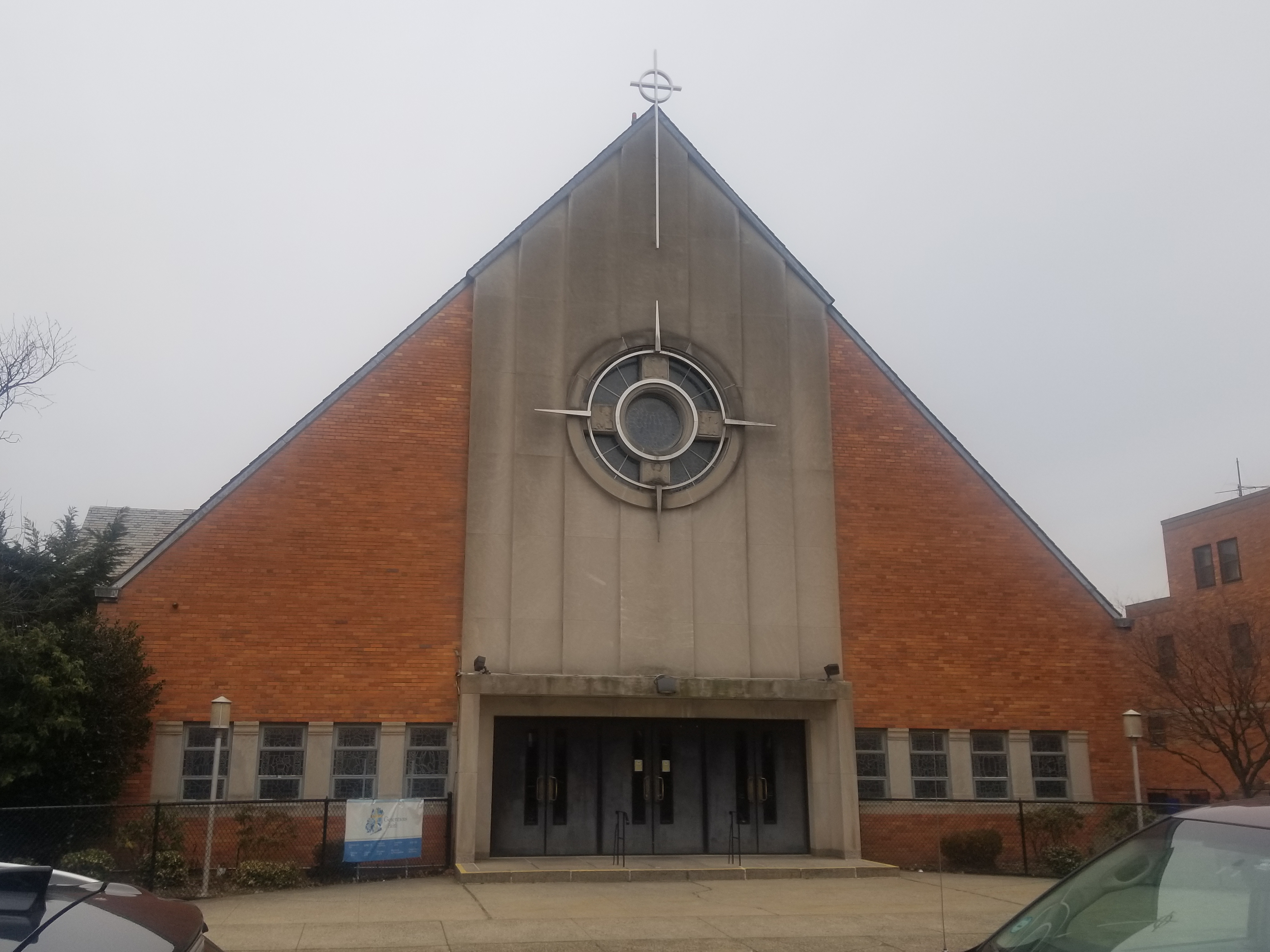
- The 80th Street main entrance of Our Lady of Fatima Church
- Our Lady of Fatima Church
- 40°45′44.31″N 73°53′20.2″W
- Location: 25-02 80th St, East Elmhurst, NY 11370
- Country: United States of America
- Denomination: Roman Catholic
- Website: https://ourladyoffatima-queens.org/

History
- Founded: 1952
- Dedication: Our Lady of Fatima
- Dedicated: 1961

Architecture
- Functional status: Active

Administration
- Diocese: Diocese of Brooklyn

Clergy
- Pastor: Rev. Darrell Da Costa

Our Lady of Fatima Roman Catholic Church is a Roman Catholic church located in the East Elmhurst neighborhood of Queens, New York City. The church property occupies a city block bounded by 80th Street, 79th Street, 30th Avenue, and 25th Avenue, and is adjacent to the LaGuardia Landing Lights Fields. Half of the property is used by Our Lady of Fatima School, a Catholic school for nursery to 8th Grade. The main entrance of the Church is located along 80th Street. The MTA Q47 bus service to Marine Air Terminal at LaGuardia Airport and The Shops at Atlas Park in Glendale passes by Our Lady of Fatima Church. Our Lady of Fatima Church also has a convent and a rectory.

== History ==
Our Lady of Fatima Catholic Church was officially founded in 1952 by Rev. Maurice Lenihan. It was under Lenihan's leadership that the church, school, convent and rectory were built. However, the parish existed since 1948. Mass services were initially held in an automobile showroom, and transferred to other locations including a tent and a Quonset hut. In 1959, construction on the Church building that still stands today began and was completed in 1961.

In 2011, Our Lady of Fatima Church celebrated its 50th anniversary which marked 50 years since the completion of the Church building.

In 2017, the parish celebrated the 100th Anniversary of the apparition of Our Lady of Fatima in Fatima, Portugal.

=== Architecture and landmarks ===
Located on the wall inside the front of the Church is a mosaic of Our Lady of Fatima's apparition with the three children of Fatima, Lucia, Jacinta, and Francisco, which provides the backdrop of the altar.

Outside the side entrance of the Church are statues depicting and honoring the apparition of Our Lady of Fatima.

Father Eugene F. Donnelly Corner is a co-named street located on the corner of 80th Street and 25th Avenue next to Our Lady of Fatima Parish. It was named after Father Donnelly who served as parish priest to the Our Lady of Fatima Parish community in East Elmhurst for 42 years. The street co-naming event took place on September 21, 2013.

== Services ==
=== Mass ===
Our Lady of Fatima provides daily and Sunday Liturgy Masses both in English and Spanish.

=== Our Lady of Fatima School ===
Our Lady of Fatima School is a Catholic school adjacent to the Church building. It serves students from grades Nursery to 8th Grade in East Elmhurst along with surrounding neighborhoods such as Jackson Heights, Woodside, Astoria Heights, and Corona. The current principal of Our Lady of Fatima School is Margaret Rogers.

=== Marguerite's Food Pantry ===
Marguerite's Food Pantry is a religious nonprofit organization based at Our Lady of Fatima Church in East Elmhurst that provides donated food and goods to those in need in East Elmhurst and surrounding neighborhoods. St. Marguerite d'Youville is the patroness saint of the pantry and was originally run by the Grey Nuns of the Sacred Heart.

=== Bulletin ===
The Bulletin is the weekly newsletter of Our Lady of Fatima Parish. The Bulletin provides information on Mass schedule times, special intentions, people to pray for, a weekly message from the pastor, parish registration, collection donation statistics, and other important upcoming events.

=== Other ===
Religious Articles Store - located in the back entrance of the Church
