= Holmes Airport =

Airport in Queens, New York City

- IATA: none; ICAO: none

Summary
- Serves: New York City, U.S.
- Location: Jackson Heights, Queens
- Opened: March 16, 1929
- Closed: 1940
- Coordinates: 40°45′46″N 073°53′37″W

Map
- Interactive map of Holmes Airport

Holmes Airport (occasionally known as Grand Central Air Terminal and Grand Central Airport) was an airport in the Jackson Heights neighborhood of Queens in New York City that operated from 1929 to 1940.

== History ==
Real estate developer E. H. Holmes built the airport on approximately 220 acres (89 ha) of undeveloped land. He organized and sold stock in Holmes Airport, Inc., but claimed that some wanted to see him fail. In February, 1929, Clarence D. Chamberlin, the aviator Viola Gentry, and Dorothy Stone, actress and daughter of Fred Stone, broke ground for the new airport. According to a contemporary street map, it extended as far as 79th Street to the east, 68th Street and St. Michael's Cemetery to the west, Astoria Boulevard to the north, and 31st Avenue to the south. The airport had two hangars, an office, and two gravel runways, of 2,800 feet (853 m) and 3,000 feet (914 m) in length, respectively.

The new airport opened on Saturday, March 16, 1929, attracting 100,000 visitors on its second day of operation. Later that year, the first scheduled flights from New York City began when Eastern Air Express started a two-day service to Miami from Holmes.

In April 1930, thousands of people paid $1 each (equivalent to $19 in 2025) for a ride in an airplane. It was promoted as an experiment to ascertain whether it was fear or the expense that kept the public from flying.

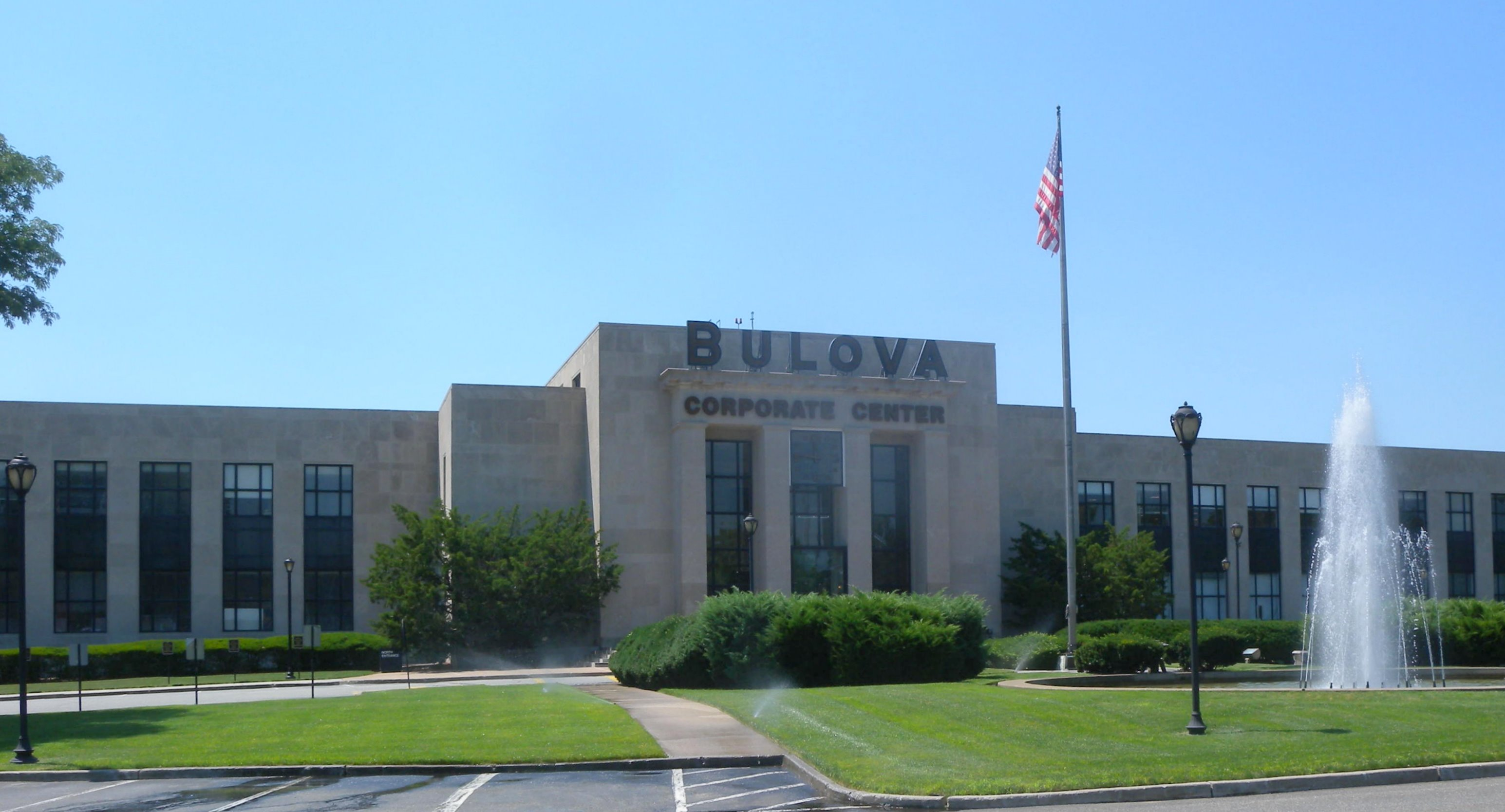
The Bulova Corporate Center occupies the northern part of the former airport.

On Sunday, November 11, 1934, sixty-four airplanes took part in a 30-mile (48 km) novelty race involving a treasure hunt and pie-eating contest, the winner returning in 28 minutes.

Blimps also used the airport. Goodyear erected a 220-foot-long (67 m) hangar in 1931 and conducted sightseeing flights. In 1936, a Goodyear Blimp based at Holmes Airport provided the first aerial traffic reports.

In 1937, the airport's owners sought a court injunction to stop New York City from spending $8,444,300 (equivalent to $189,000,000 in 2025) to develop the smaller North Beach Airport, only a mile or so to the northeast, into the much larger LaGuardia Airport. Supreme Court Justice Ernest E. L. Hammer denied the request. LaGuardia Airport opened in 1939 and Holmes Airport closed the following year. E. H. Holmes filed for bankruptcy in 1940 and the airport property was condemned.

The northern portion of Holmes Airport's land was later developed into veteran housing and the Bulova watch factory site. In the mid-1980s, the watch factory was converted into office space as the Bulova Corporate Center.

== See also ==
- Aviation in the New York metropolitan area
