= Q23 (New York City bus) =

Bus route in Queens, New York

q23
- 108th Street−Ditmars Boulevard; Forest Hills−Corona−East Elmhurst
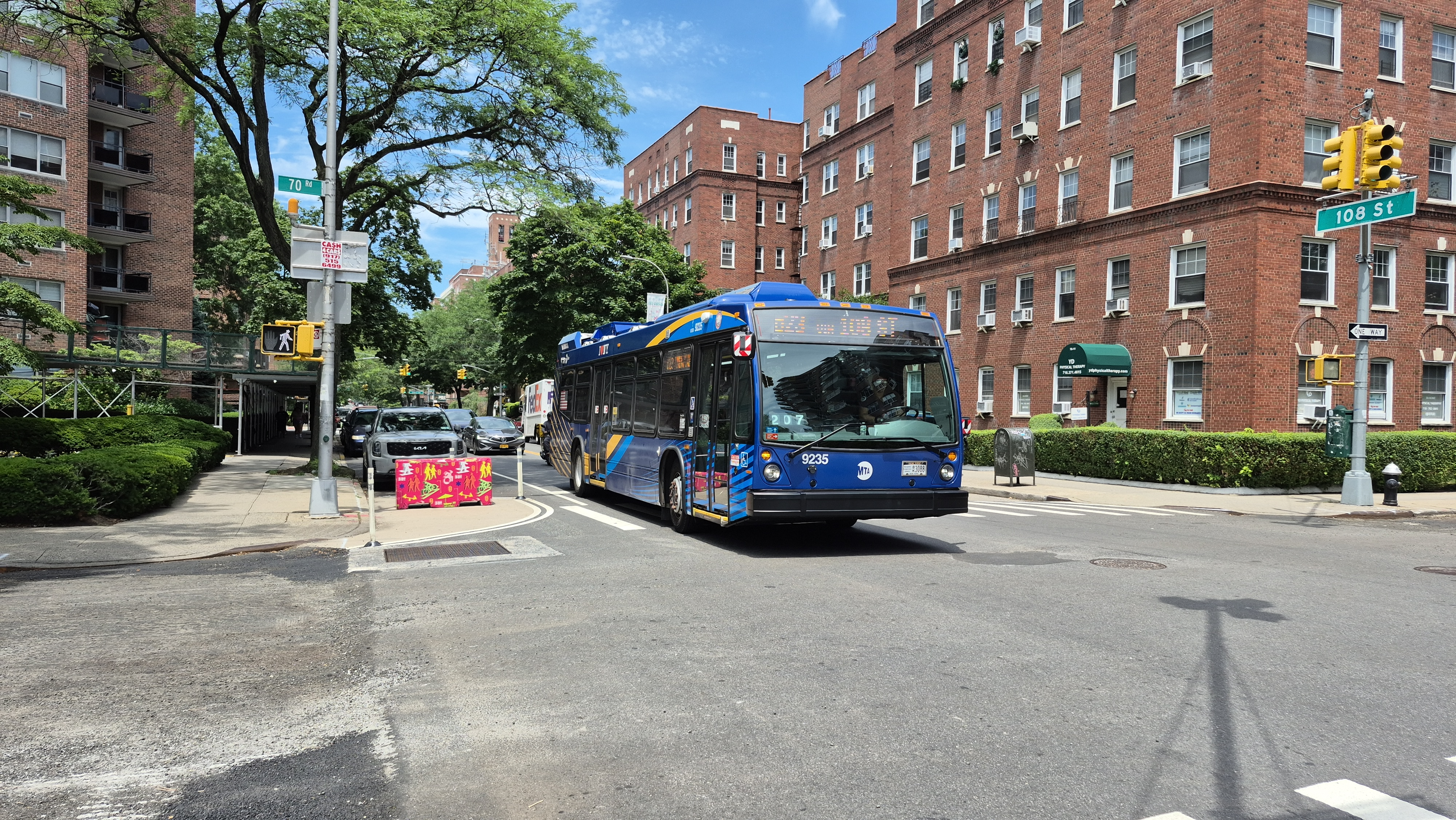
- 2024 Nova LFS #9235 on the Forest Hills-bound Q23 at 108th Street/70th Road

Overview
- System: MTA Regional Bus Operations
- Operator: MTA Bus Company
- Garage: LaGuardia Depot
- Vehicle: Nova Bus LFS; New Flyer Xcelsior XD40
- Began service: 1925

Route
- Locale: Queens, New York, U.S.
- Communities served: East Elmhurst, Corona, Forest Hills
- Start: East Elmhurst – 102nd Street and Ditmars Boulevard
- Via: Ditmars Boulevard, 108th Street, 69th Avenue
- End: Forest Hills – Union Turnpike and Trotting Course Lane (Crescent Apartments)
- Length: 6.2 miles (10.0 km)

Service
- Operates: 24 hours
- Annual patronage: 3,547,749 (2025)
- Transfers: Yes
- Timetable: Q23

The Q23 bus route constitutes a public transit line in central Queens, New York City. The Q23 was formerly privately operated by the Triboro Coach Corporation, under a subsidized franchise with the New York City Department of Transportation (NYCDOT). The route is now operated by MTA Regional Bus Operations under the MTA Bus Company brand. The bus provides service between East Elmhurst in northwestern Queens to Forest Hills in central Queens, running mainly along 108th Street and providing access to the New York City Subway at the Forest Hills–71st Avenue station.

== Route description and service ==
The northbound Q23 makes a winding loop in order to get onto 71st Avenue. It originates on Union Turnpike at a Stop & Shop supermarket in Forest Hills, just east of the abandoned Rockaway Beach Branch of the Long Island Rail Road (LIRR). It then turns right at Woodhaven Boulevard, passing over the LIRR's Montauk Branch, before making another right at Metropolitan Avenue. The Q23 then turns left onto 71st Avenue. The northbound route is about 0.25 miles (0.40 km) away from the southbound route through this stretch. At Kessel Street, the Q23 turns left, then two blocks later, turns right onto 69th Avenue. To cross the LIRR's Main Line, the Q23 takes a circuitous route, turning left onto Burns Street, right onto Yellowstone Boulevard (traveling underneath the LIRR), right onto Queens Boulevard, and left onto 108th Street. The Q23 then turns right at 31st Drive and left at Ditmars Boulevard, then terminates a few blocks later at 102nd Street near LaGuardia Airport.

The southbound Q23 originates at 102nd Street and Ditmars Boulevard near LaGuardia Airport. It continues down Ditmars Boulevard and turns right at 31st Drive. It then travels south on 108th Street, following the path of the northbound route until 69th Avenue in Forest Hills. The Q23 turns left onto Loubet Street, then makes a right onto 71st Avenue, since Kessel Street is one-way northwest-bound. It goes straight onto 71st Avenue, before turning right onto Union Turnpike, where it terminates.

=== School trippers ===
When school is in session, two trips to East Elmhurst originate at 67th Avenue near Forest Hills High School. These trips depart at 1:44 and 4:10pm.

== History ==
=== North Shore Bus Company ===
Q23 service began in 1925 as a North Shore Bus Company route. The route initially ran between Ditmars Boulevard and 29th Avenue in East Elmhurst and Otis Avenue and Corona Avenue in Corona. Therefore, the route was known as the Corona–Ditmars Boulevard line. An extension of the line along 108th Street to Queens Boulevard in Forest Hills was envisioned, but because 108th Street south of Otis Avenue was just being filled and graded, and as there were no adjacent streets for buses to run on, but was not initiated until later on. On April 5, 1932, Chairman John Delaney of the Board of Transportation approved the extension of the Q23 to Queens Boulevard as part of a renewed contract, which had been proposed by Joseph V. McKee, the president of the Board of Alderman. The route was extended on, and provided a connection with the Independent Subway System's IND Queens Boulevard Line at the Forest Hills–71st Avenue subway station. Once extended, the route became known as the Forest Hills–Ditmars Boulevard line. The route was later extended further to Metropolitan Avenue, making the route 2.25 miles longer than it had originally been.

The North Shore Bus Company's certification for the route was contested by the Brooklyn–Manhattan Transit Corporation in 1933, as the BMT believed that the route would have competed with its Junction Boulevard trolley service. At hearings, the BMT testified that since bus line started running, the traffic on the trolley line had fallen off. On December 2, 1932, the Board of Estimate approved the franchise applications for eight routes: seven for North Shore, including for the Q23, and one for Triboro Coach. On February 18, 1933, the franchise grant for the Q23 was granted to the North Shore Bus Company. In 1934, the North Shore Bus Company petitioned to extend the route along 37th Avenue. The franchise grant was reawarded on January 25, 1935, and by the time of this grant, the route was extended from 2.7 to 6.4 miles (4.3 to 10.3 km). This modification provided, among other things, for extending Route Q23, Forest Hills-Ditmars Boulevard, southerly from 108th Street and Otis Avenue to Metropolitan Avenue, a distance of approximately 2.25 miles in order that connection might be made with the Independent Subway System at Queens Boulevard.

=== Triboro Coach Corporation ===
On September 24, 1936, the franchise for the Q23 was awarded to the Triboro Coach Corporation. On October 29, 1936, local consent for ten years was secured from New York City. Triboro Coach operation of the route began on January 3, 1938.

In 1937, the Q23's southern terminal was Continental Avenue (71st Avenue) and Metropolitan Avenue. Metropolitan Avenue-bound buses would turn east on Loubet Street, and then south on 72nd Avenue, before terminating at Metropolitan Avenue.

All night service and more frequent service during the day, after two years of pressure, was installed on the Q23 in September 1950. In 1976, a proposed extension of the route to serve more of Forest Hills was discussed at a Queens Community Board 6 meeting. In 1988, the Q23 was extended to Union Turnpike. As part of the Queens Subway Options Study it was suggested that if the Queens Bypass would have run via the Lower Montauk Branch, the Q23 be extended to Woodhaven Boulevard to connect with the line.

=== MTA Bus Company ===
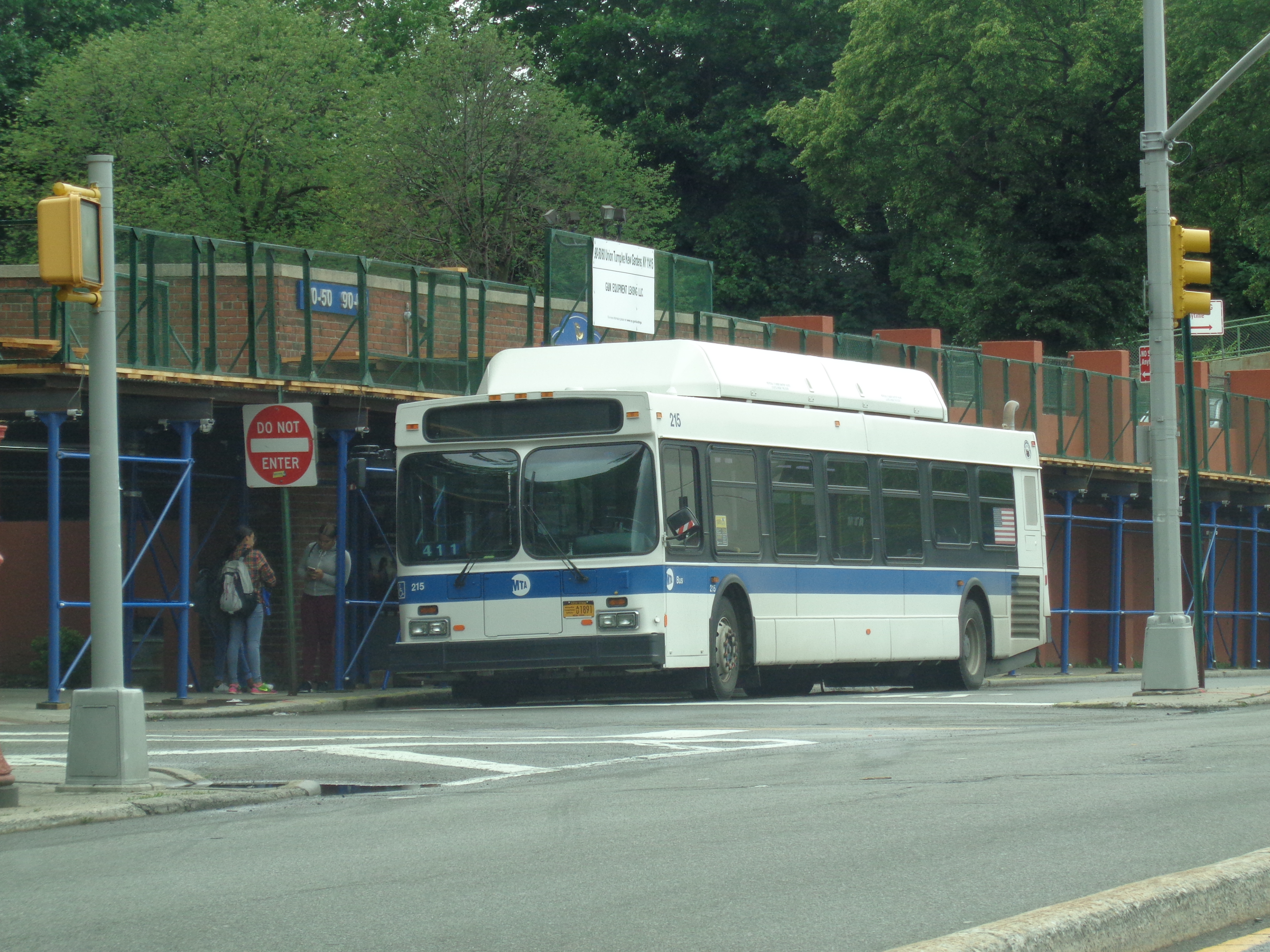
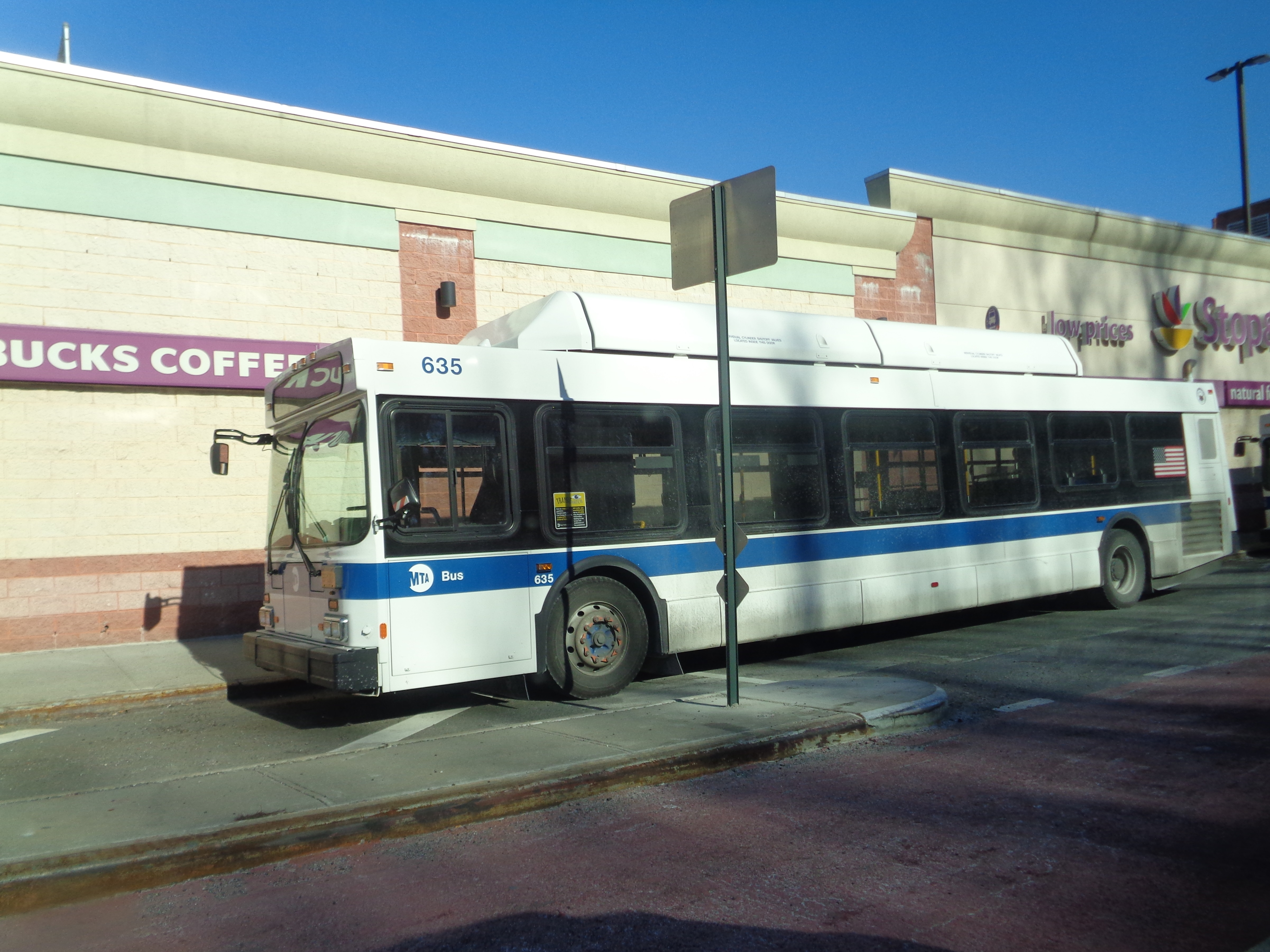
Two New Flyer C40LFs: one 2011 (215) at the former Forest Hills terminal at Forest View Crescent (top) and one 2012 (635) at the new layover area across Union Turnpike (bottom).

On February 2, 2006, Triboro Coach ceased operations and the Q23, as well as all other routes operating under Triboro Coach, were picked up by the Metropolitan Transportation Authority (MTA). Fare structures were converted to those of the MTA. Between 2006 and 2007 the layover of the Q23 was changed. Previously it would run east on Loubet Street, and then south on 72nd Avenue before turning west on Metropolitan Avenue and finally Woodhaven Boulevard before terminating at the Crescent Apartments on Union Turnpike. The routing was changed so that after Loubet Street the Q23 would turn onto 71st Avenue and then onto Metropolitan Avenue avoiding 72nd Avenue entirely.

In the late 2000s, the MTA was considering extending the Q23 to LaGuardia Airport. Signs along the route showed this proposed extension, as well as bus destination signs.

From 2014 to 2025, the Q23 was based out of the College Point Depot due to plans for the Q53 to become a Select Bus Service route. On September 23, 2017, the route of the Q23's terminal loop in Forest Hills was reversed. The new route runs southwest on Union Turnpike, north on Woodhaven Boulevard, and east on Metropolitan Avenue. The bus route's layover area is now on the north side of Union Turnpike. The change took place in conjunction with Select Bus Service improvements to Woodhaven Boulevard, which resulted in the left turn from southbound Woodhaven Boulevard to eastbound Union Turnpike being banned. Queens Community Board 6 members had objected to some parts of the left-turn ban, citing that the loop served some stores and the Forest Park Crescents cooperative apartment development.

==== Bus redesign ====
In December 2019, the MTA released a draft redesign of the Queens bus network. As part of the redesign, the Q23 would have been replaced by a high-density "intra-borough" route, the QT11, running along 108th Street, Queens Boulevard, Union Turnpike, and 188th Street to Fresh Meadows. The QT11 would still originate in East Elmhurst but would continue along 108th Street between Ditmars and Queens Boulevards. The existing routings in Corona and Forest Hills would have been replaced by two "neighborhood" bus routes, the QT82 and QT87 respectively. The redesign was delayed due to the COVID-19 pandemic in New York City in 2020, and the original draft plan was dropped due to negative feedback. At the time, the Q23 was one of the slowest bus routes in New York City due to its serpentine path. From 2018 to 2022, it consistently traveled slower than 8 miles per hour (13 km/h), the average speed of New York City bus routes.

A revised plan was released in March 2022. As part of the new plan, the Q23 would become a "limited-stop" route and run overnight, following the routing of the QT11; it would supplement the Q46 and a new Q48 service, which would run nonstop on Union Turnpike west of 188th Street. The Corona and Forest Hills sections would be respectively replaced by two new "local" routes, the Q14 and Q73.

A final bus-redesign plan was released in December 2023. The Q23 was to be truncated to the 103rd Street–Corona Plaza station at its north end, but its south end would remain unchanged. A new Q14 service would take over the segment north of Corona Plaza.

On December 17, 2024, addendums to the final plan were released. Among these, Q23 service to East Elmhurst was retained, but it will take over the current Q48 route via 108th Street and Ditmars Boulevard, and will use Yellowstone Boulevard instead of Austin Street in Forest Hills. Current Q23 service via 102nd/103rd Streets and 29th Avenue will be replaced by the new Q14. Bus stops were also rearranged. On January 29, 2025, the current plan was approved by the MTA Board, and the Queens Bus Redesign went into effect in two different phases during Summer 2025. The Q23 is part of Phase I, which started on June 29, 2025.

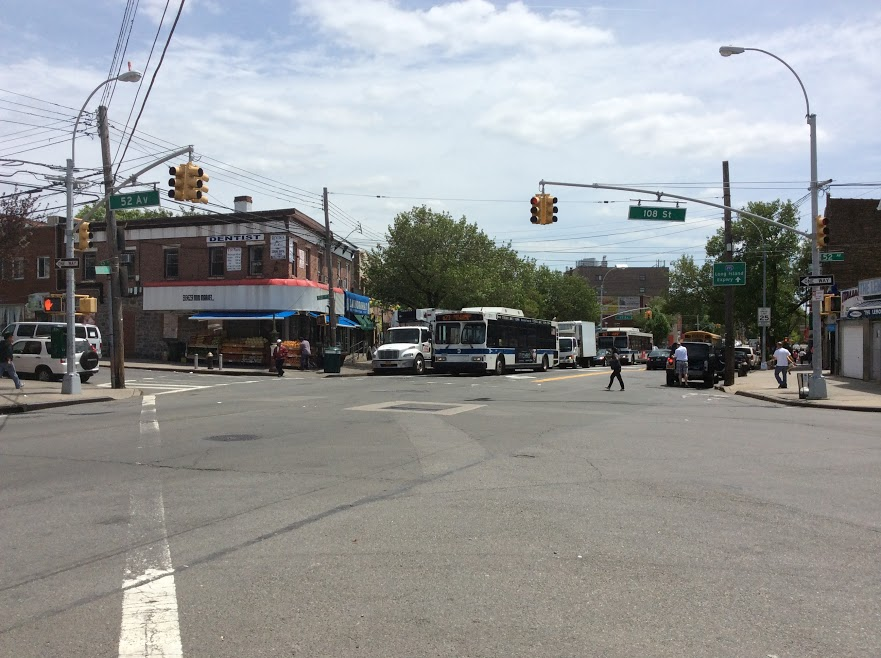
Two Orion VII OGs on the East Elmhurst-bound Q23 approaching 108th Street/52nd/Corona Avenues

== Connecting bus routes ==
- Q90 (at Ditmars Boulevard)
- Q19 (at Astoria Boulevard)
- Q63, Q66 (at Northern Boulevard)
- Q58 (at Corona Avenue)
- Q88, Q98, QM10, QM11, QM40 (at Horace Harding Expressway)
- Q38 (at 62nd Drive/63rd Road)
- Q64, Q74 (at 69th Road/Jewel Avenue)
- Q60 (at Queens Boulevard)
- Q11, Q52 SBS, Q53 SBS, Q54, QM12, QM15, QM42, BM5 (at Metropolitan Avenue)

== See also ==
- Triboro Coach Corporation
