= QCS =

QCS may refer to:

- Queen's Colour Squadron, a unit of the British Royal Air Force
- Queensland Core Skills Test, a former year-12 standardised test in Queensland, Australia
- Queensland Corrective Services, a Queensland Government department, Australia
- quick connection system, a system of quick connect fittings
- quality control system, a system for quality control

== See also ==
- Queen Charlotte Sound (disambiguation)
- WQCS, station QCS in region W
- QC (disambiguation) for the singular of QCs
