= Q69 and Q100 buses =

Bus routes in Queens, New York

q69 q100 ltd
- 21st Street Buses
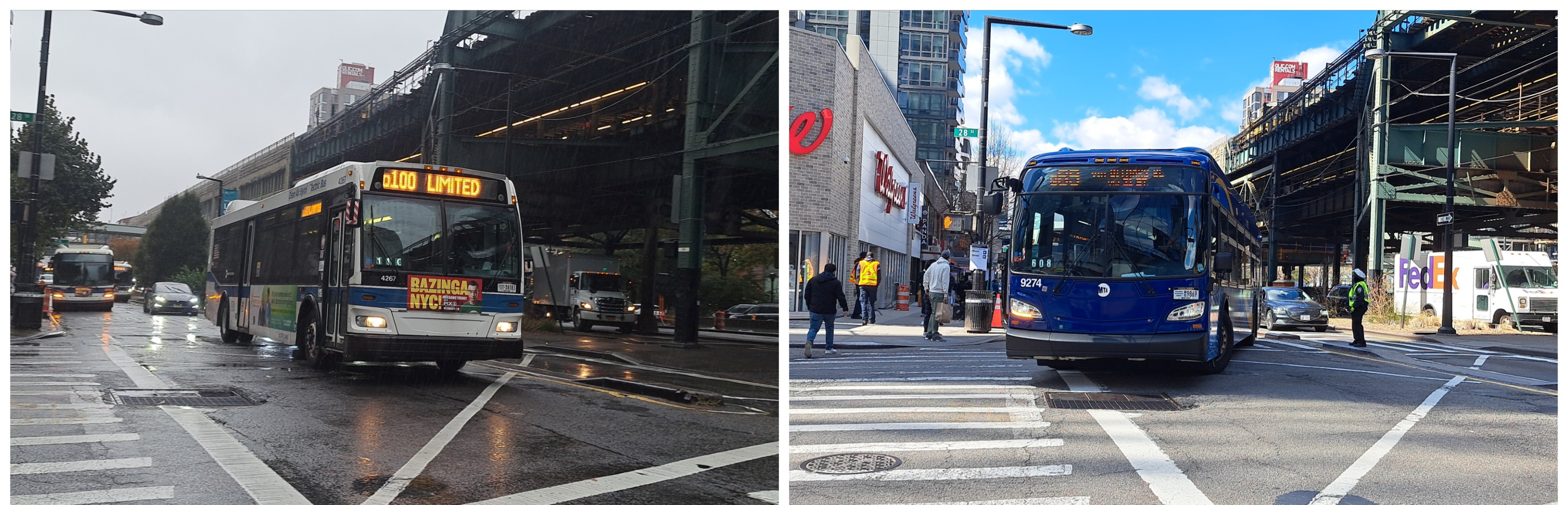
- A 2009 Orion VII NG HEV Spectrum (4267) on the Q100, and a 2024 XD40 (9274) on the Q69 to Long Island City, both at the Queensboro Plaza subway station

Overview
- System: MTA Regional Bus Operations
- Operator: MTA Bus Company
- Garage: LaGuardia Depot
- Vehicle: New Flyer Xcelsior XD40; Nova Bus LFS
- Began service: 1933 (Q69); 1980s (Q100)

Route
- Locale: Queens, New York, U.S.
- Communities served: Queens: Long Island City, Astoria, Steinway, Jackson Heights, East Elmhurst; The Bronx (Q100): Rikers Island
- Start: Long Island City – Queens Plaza: Q69: 28th Street and Queens Plaza South / Queensboro Plaza station; Q100: Jackson Avenue and Queens Plaza South / Queens Plaza station
- Via: 21st Street
- End: Q69: Jackson Heights – 82nd Street and Astoria Boulevard; Q100: Rikers Island, Bronx
- Length: 5.4 miles (8.7 km) (Q69); 5.7 miles (9.2 km) (Q100)
- Other routes: B62

Service
- Operates: 24 hours (Q100); All times except late nights (Q69)
- Annual patronage: Q69: 2,458,888 (2025); Q100: 926,508 (2025)
- Transfers: Yes
- Timetable: Q69; Q100

The Q69 and Q100 Limited bus routes constitute a public transit line in western Queens, New York City. Beginning at Queens Plaza in Long Island City, the routes run primarily along 21st Street through the neighborhoods of Long Island City and Astoria. The Q69 makes all local stops, while the Q100 makes four limited stops along the shared corridor between Queens Plaza and Ditmars Boulevard. At Ditmars Boulevard, the Q69 turns east towards Jackson Heights and East Elmhurst near LaGuardia Airport. The Q100, meanwhile, continues north of Queens across Bowery Bay to the city jail complex on Rikers Island in the Bronx, providing the only public transit service to the island.

The Q69 (originally the Q19A) was formerly privately operated by the Triboro Coach Corporation, and the Q100 (formerly the Q101R) by the Queens Surface Corporation, under subsidized franchises with the New York City Department of Transportation (NYCDOT). The Q19A itself was a merger of two bus routes, an older Q19A route and the Q51 (originally the Q33A), which were combined into a single route by 1960. The older Q19A was established in the 1920s and ran from the Astoria–Ditmars Boulevard station to Queens Plaza along 21st Street, while the Q51 was established in the late 1930s and ran from the Astoria–Ditmars Boulevard station east to Jackson Heights along Ditmars Boulevard. The Q101R, meanwhile, was created in the 1980s to replace the Q101 service to Rikers Island, and originally ran non-stop between 21st Street–Queensbridge and Rikers Island. From 2005 to 2006, the routes were taken over by MTA Regional Bus Operations under the MTA Bus Company brand, and relabeled to their current designations in 2008. Since then, limited stops were added to the now-Q100 route to improve service along 21st Street. On August 31, 2025, Q69 service to Court Square was discontinued.

== Route description and service ==
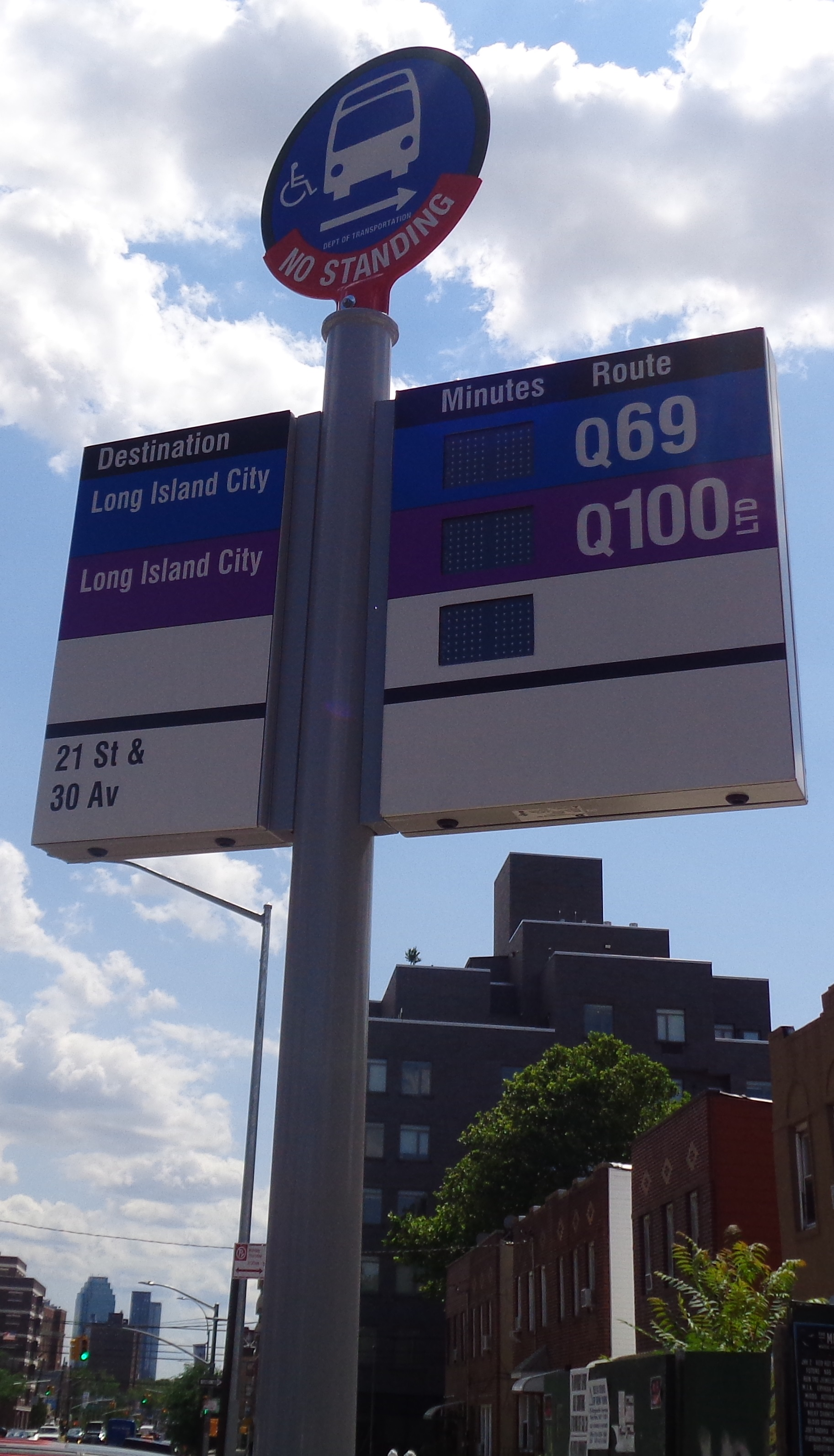
A Q69/Q100 Long Island City bus stop with countdown clocks at 21st Street/30th Avenue in Astoria

The Q69 and Q100 both begin on Queens Plaza in Long Island City, sharing a south–north corridor along 21st Street through Long Island City and Astoria. The Q69 provides local service along 21st Street between Queens Plaza and Ditmars Boulevard, while the Q100 provides limited-stop service along the street. Both routes operate out of the LaGuardia Depot in East Elmhurst.

=== Q69 ===
The Q69 begins at 28th Street and Queens Plaza South, near the Queensboro Plaza subway station. Northbound service travels west on 42nd Drive, north on 23rd Street, west on Queens Plaza North, then north on 21st Street. At Ditmars Boulevard, the Q69 turns east through the neighborhood of Steinway. It terminates at 82nd Street and Astoria Boulevard in the Jackson Heights and East Elmhurst neighborhoods, near the Marine Air Terminal of LaGuardia Airport. Travel into the airport requires a transfer to the Q33 or M60 SBS. Southbound service starts at Astoria Boulevard and 82nd Street, traveling northwest to 78th Street and then north to Ditmars Boulevard. From there, the Q69 follows a simpler route, traveling west on Ditmars Boulevard, south on 21st Street, and east on Queens Plaza South before terminating. The Q69 runs as frequently as every 6 minutes during weekday middays, with off-peak headways increasing to as much as 30 minutes. It does not operate during overnight hours.

=== Q100 ===
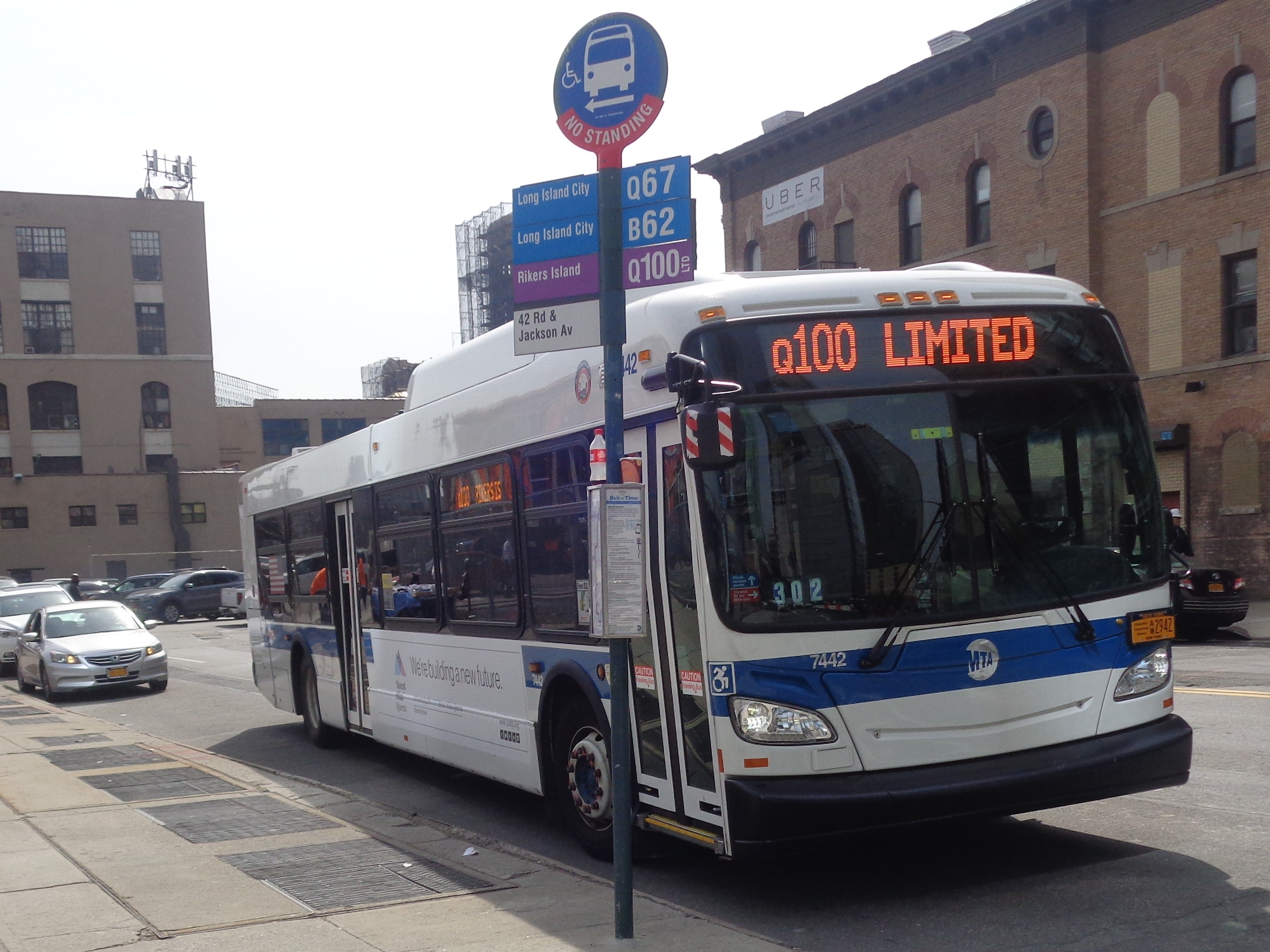
A 2015 XD40 (7442) on the Q100 to Rikers Island at 42nd Street/Jackson Avenue.

The Q100 begins at Jackson Avenue between Queens Plaza South and 42nd Road, at the Queens Plaza station. After running west through the Queens Plaza area, it turns north onto 21st Street, stopping at the 21st Street–Queensbridge station at the Queensbridge Houses, then making four more stops along the street. At the end of 21st Street in the Ditmars section of Astoria, the Q100 turns east onto 20th Avenue, making stops at 31st, Steinway, and 46th–47th Streets. It then turns north onto Hazen Street, making another stop at 19th Avenue. Travel north of 19th Avenue (formerly Riker Avenue) is within the jurisdiction of the New York City Correction Department. The Q100 makes its final stop in Queens at the Rikers Island parking lot. It then crosses the Rikers Island Bridge onto the island itself, passing through both security checkpoints, and terminating at the Rikers Island visitors center.

Though the Q100 is the limited-stop service along the corridor, it runs much less frequently than the Q69. It operates on 10-20 minute headways during daytime hours, 40 minute headways during early mornings and evenings, and 1 hour headways during overnight hours. Weekend early-morning and midday service is more frequent than the corresponding weekday service.

The Q100 is the only public transit option to Rikers Island. Otherwise, travel must be done by ferry, car, or privately operated shuttle between either foot of the bridge. Prior to the MTA takeover, the then-Q101R operated non-stop between 21st Street–Queensbridge and the Queens Rikers Island parking lot. Although service on the route was expanded in February 2009 to better serve communities along the route, much of the ridership of the Q100 still consists of inmates' family members – who are predominantly women and children – as well as prison employees. The bus also transports some released inmates, particularly women.

== History ==
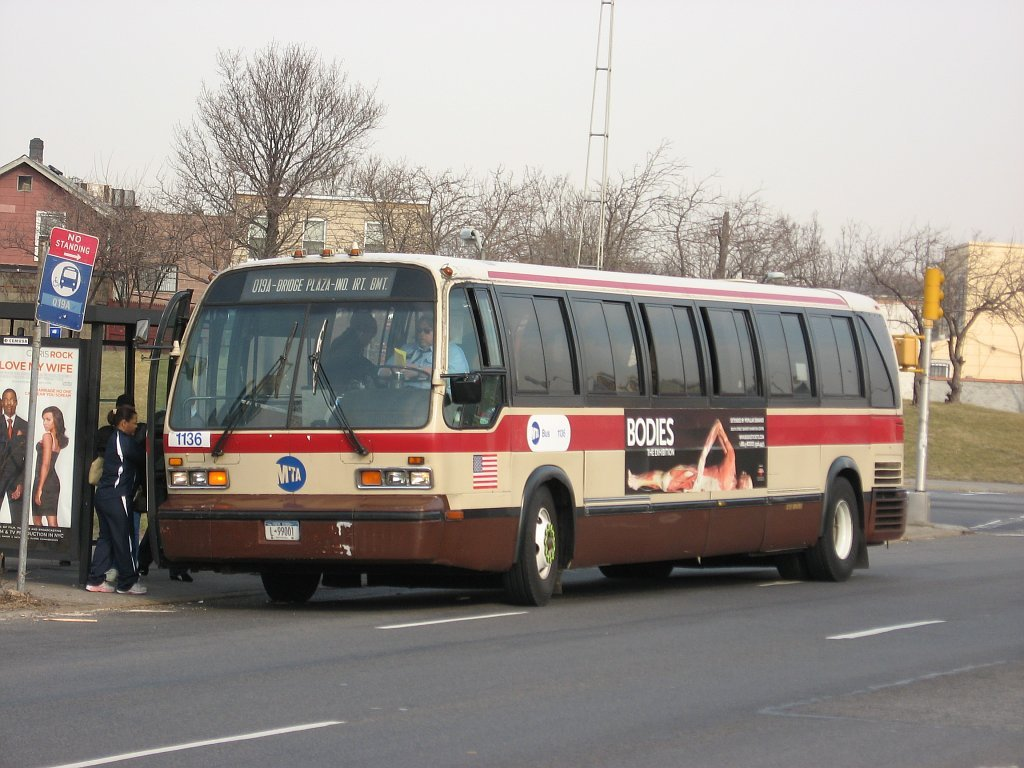
A former Jamaica Buses 1986 GMC RTS-04 (1136) in East Elmhurst on the former Q19A to Queens Plaza

=== Former Q19A ===
Before the MTA takeover, the Q69 was known as the Q19A. In the 1920s, the Woodside-Astoria Transportation Company, founded by Salvatore Fornatora, began operating the Q18, Q19, Q19A, and Q24 routes. The first iteration of the Q19A ran from the 92nd Street ferry slip in Hallets Cove, along 21st Street (Van Alst Avenue) and Ditmars Boulevard where it served the Astoria–Ditmars Boulevard station, and ended near Hazen Street.

On April 10, 1931, the Woodside-Astoria Transportation company was reorganized as the Triboro Coach Corporation. Starting on August 10, 1934, the Q19A ran from the Ditmars Boulevard station, was diverted from the ferry slip, and was extended along 21st Street to Queens Plaza, where it began competing with the parallel 31st Street and Vernon Boulevard streetcar lines of the Steinway Railway (now the Q102 and Q103 buses respectively). On September 24, 1936, the New York City Board of Transportation (predecessor to the New York City Transit Authority) separated bus service in Queens into four zones. Zone A in Western Queens (Woodside, Astoria, and Long Island City), which included the Q19A, was awarded to Triboro Coach. and on October 10, 1936, the company signed the contract granting the franchise.

In 1938, Triboro was asked by the Steinway Community Council to extend service along Ditmars Boulevard to East Elmhurst and in 1939, the company proposed the Q33A route along Ditmars as an extension to their existing Q33 franchise to serve the request. The Q33A, also called the 82nd Street Crosstown-Ditmars route, operated from the station to 82nd Street in Jackson Heights. Through bus riders not destined for the subway had to transfer between buses. During off-peak hours, the Q33A was extended to 102nd Street and Astoria Boulevard, the terminus of what was then the Q19B route (now the Q49) and at that time the terminal of the Q19.

During the late 1940s and early 1950s, there were often complaints of overcrowding and bad headways on the Q19A, such as from the Taminent Democratic Club of Long Island City. The overcrowding resulted in passengers waiting for several buses until an empty one arrived.

The bus stop at the Ditmars Boulevard station served by the Q19A and Q33A was initially located in the middle of the block on 31st Street near the subway entrance and was considered more convenient for subway riders, as it was adjacent to the station stairs. In May 1949, Triboro Coach appealed to the police commissioner for permission to move the bus stop north to the corner of Ditmars Boulevard and 31st Street and two months later a permit was approved. In October 1949, the bus stop was shifted back to the station stairs following protests from commuters. This shift back to the stairs was made under a different, albeit temporary, permit but the first permit for the stop at the corner was not revoked, and so at the end of April 1950, Triboro decided to shift the bus stop back to the corner, this time due to several accidents with the pillars of the Astoria elevated line. As late as 1962, there were calls to reinstate the former setup.

The Q33A was later renumbered to the Q51. In December 1958, Triboro Coach petitioned the Board of Estimate to eliminate the Q51 and replace it with an extended Q19A service, thus merging the two routes into a single route around 1960.

=== Former Q101R ===
Prior to the creation of the Q101R, the Q101 operated by Steinway Transit (successor to the Steinway Railway) served Rikers Island, running local down Steinway Street to Queens Plaza, and across the Queensboro Bridge to 59th Street and Second Avenue in Midtown Manhattan. Service to Rikers began around 1967; the bridge from Queens to the island was opened on November 22, 1966. Some local residents complained of having to share the route with Rikers-bound passengers. As a result, the service began being labeled the Q101R in the early 1990s, with the Q101 truncated to Hazen Street and 19th Avenue, no longer serving Rikers Island. Originally, the Q101R ran non-stop between Long Island City and the Rikers Island parking lot running via Steinway Street. Steinway merged with sister company Queens Transit Corporation to become Queens-Steinway Transit Corporation in 1986. The company became Queens Surface Corporation in 1988.

=== MTA Bus takeover ===
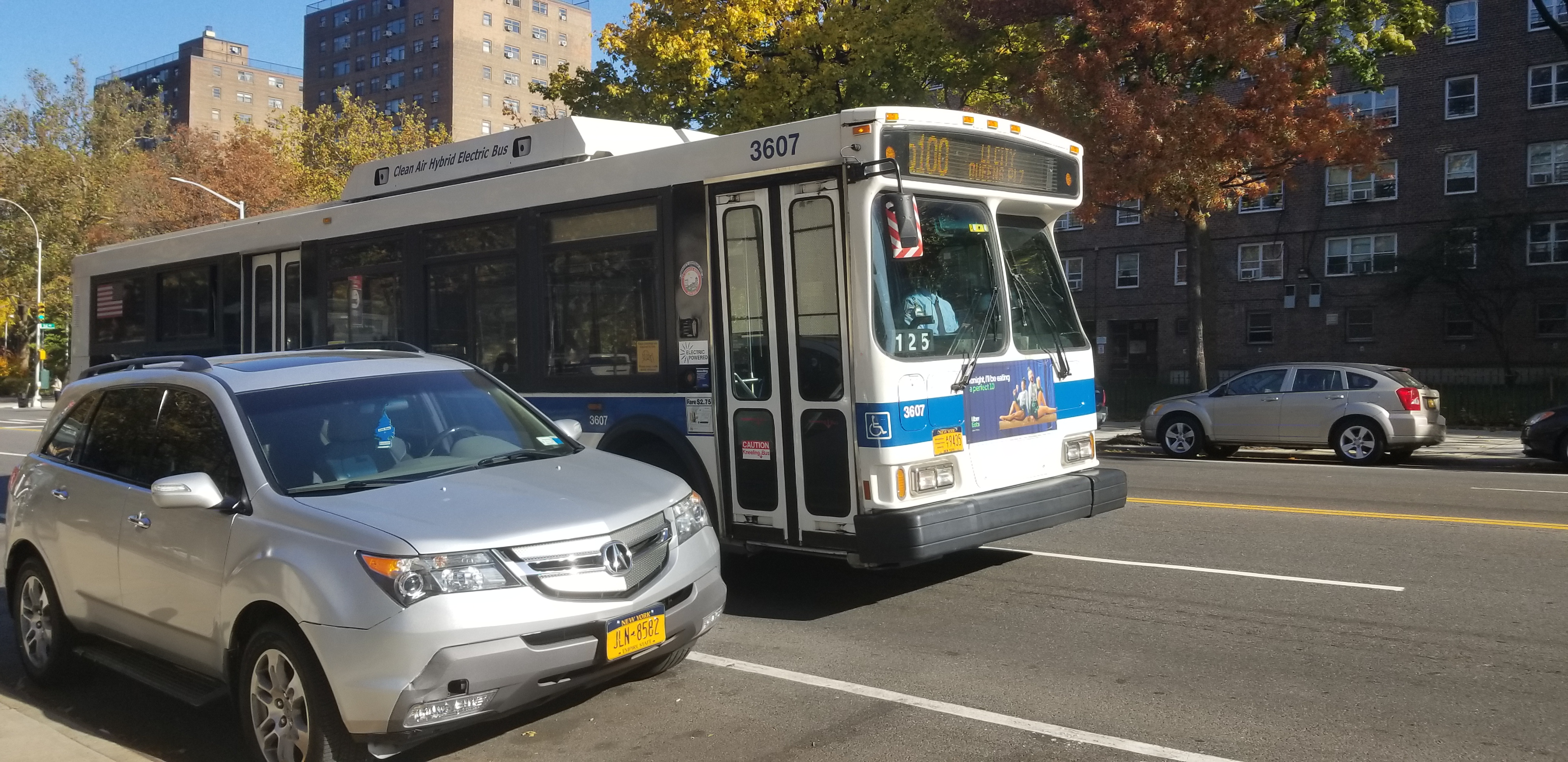
A 2006 Orion VII OG HEV (3607) on the Long Island City-bound Q100 Limited

On February 27, 2005, the MTA Bus Company took over the operations of the Queens Surface routes including the Q101R, part of the city's takeover of all the remaining privately operated bus routes. On February 2, 2006, the operations of Triboro Coach including the Q19A were taken over by MTA Bus. As part of the takeover, the Q101R and other former Steinway Transit routes in western Queens were moved to the former Triboro Coach depot (LaGuardia Depot). On April 6, 2008, the Q101R was renumbered as the Q100, and on April 20, 2008, the Q19A was renumbered the Q69. On June 22, 2008, the Q100 stop on 20th Avenue at the Astoria power plant was added. Q100 limited-stop service along 21st Street began on February 1, 2009.

==== Bus redesign ====
In December 2019, the MTA released a draft redesign of the Queens bus network. As part of the redesign, the Q69 bus would have become an "intra-borough" route called the QT69, running south to Hunters Point rather than to Long Island City. The QT69 would have used 44th Drive, Vernon Boulevard, and Center Boulevard on the southern portion of its route. Along 21st Street between 21st Avenue and 44th Drive, it would have been paralleled by the QT1, a "high density" route which would have run from 27th Avenue/2nd Street to Brooklyn. The Rikers Island route would have become the QT79, a local route along 31st Street. The redesign was delayed due to the COVID-19 pandemic in New York City in 2020, and the original draft plan was dropped due to negative feedback.

A revised plan was released in March 2022. As part of the new plan, the Q69 would have instead become a "zone" route with a nonstop section on 21st Street between Broadway and 40th Avenue. The Q69 would have still been extended to Hunters Point but would instead use 44th Drive, Vernon Boulevard, and Borden Avenue. The B62 bus would have been extended to 27th Avenue/2nd Street, providing local service on 21st Street. The Q100 would have been discontinued and a new parallel route, the Q105 on 31st Street, would run to Rikers Island instead.

A final bus-redesign plan was released in December 2023. The Q69 would have still become a zone route but would have been shortened to Queens Plaza, rather than extended to Hunters Point. The Q100 would have still been discontinued and replaced by the parallel Q105 on 31st Street, which would run to Rikers Island.

On December 17, 2024, addendums to the final plan were released. Among these, the Q69 was reverted to a “Local” route with stop changes, and the current Q100 route was retained. On January 29, 2025, the current plan was approved by the MTA Board, and the Queens Bus Redesign went into effect in two different phases during Summer 2025. Both routes are part of Phase II, which began on August 31, 2025.

== Incidents ==
On June 26, 2016, a fire truck collided with a Q100 bus traveling northward on 21st Street at Ditmars Blvd. Two firefighters and all 12 passengers on the Q100 bus were injured and taken to the hospital.

== Ridership ==
In 2018, the latest year for which passenger numbers are available, the Q69 had 2,932,729 passengers while the Q100 Limited had 1,345,218 passengers.
