= QC Record Format =

The QC Record Format was one of the two standard formats used for the interchange of financial transactions in the New Zealand banking system. It was used until 2012, when the SBI (Settlement Before Interchange) system was introduced. The other standard format, BACHO, remained in use together with SBI.

QC-format transactions were primarily used in batch processing systems running on MVS mainframe computers. A QC record consists of a fixed 23-byte header (containing record type codes, destination account details, and the transaction amount) followed by zero or more optional fields, each of which is of variable size.

== See also ==
- Record-oriented filesystem
