= Astoria Boulevard =

Boulevard in Queens, New York

- Astoria Boulevard North; Astoria Boulevard South
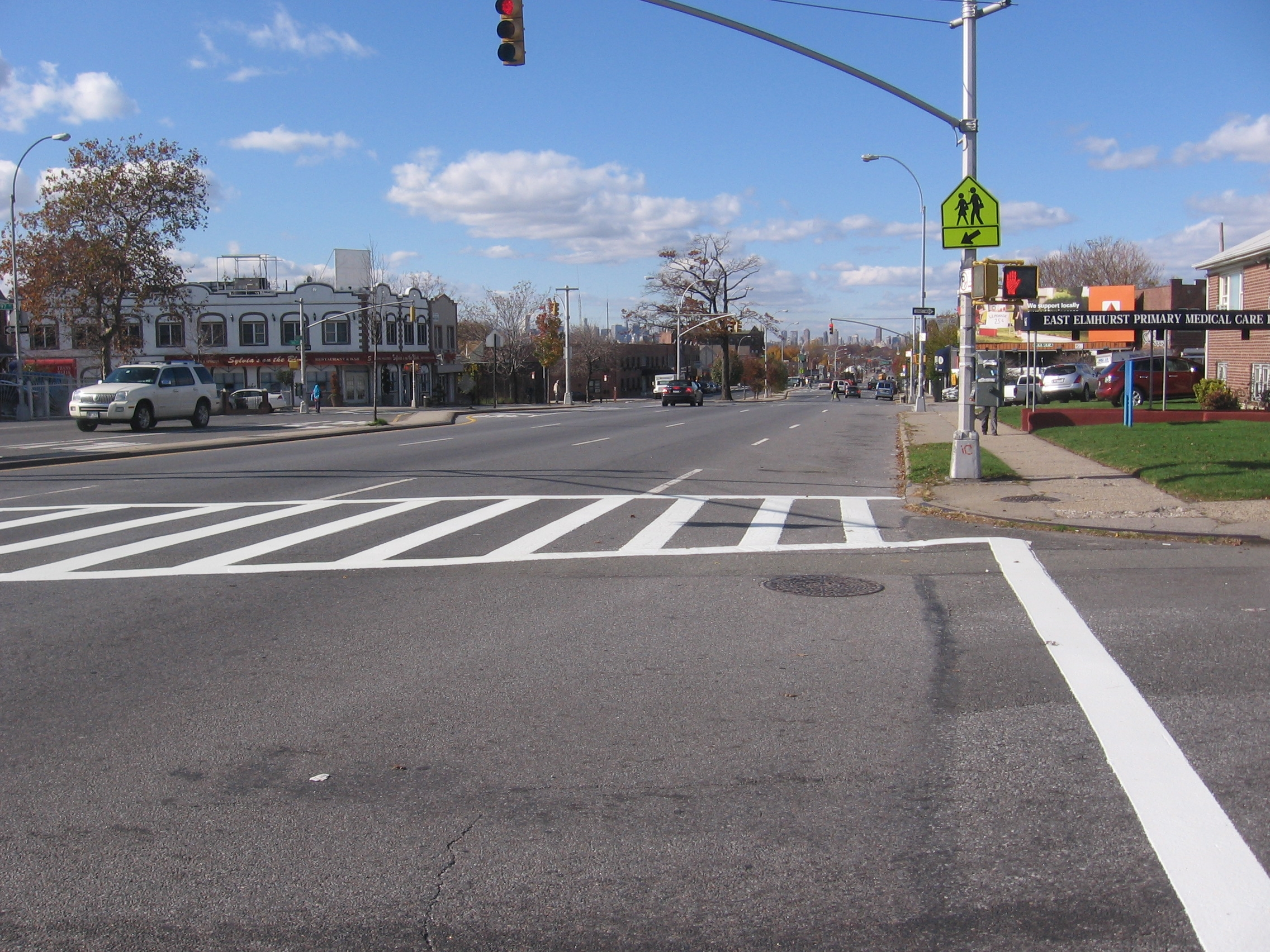
- Looking west along Astoria Boulevard in East Elmhurst
- Namesake: John Jacob Astor
- Owner: City of New York
- Maintained by: NYCDOT
- Length: 4.4 mi (7.1 km)
- Location: Queens, New York City
- Nearest metro station: Astoria Boulevard
- West end: 1st Street in Astoria
- Major junctions: I-278 / Grand Central Parkway in Astoria
- East end: NY 25A / Grand Central Parkway in East Elmhurst

Astoria Boulevard is an important east–west commercial street in Astoria and East Elmhurst, Queens, New York City. It runs from 1st Street at the East River to the World's Fair Marina on Flushing Bay, where it merges with Northern Boulevard. Just before the junction of the two boulevards, there is a large two lane ramp leading to the Whitestone Expressway. Most of the traffic on Astoria Boulevard heads toward this ramp, and then onto the Expressway.

Astoria Boulevard is the southern border of Astoria Heights, and the northern border of North Corona.

== Description ==
In East Elmhurst, Astoria Boulevard is a wide six lane, median divided street. However, traffic is usually light on the boulevard, presumably because the boulevard runs parallel to the busier Northern Boulevard and Grand Central Parkway. During rush hours, though, this road becomes a major artery, serving as an alternate route to the Grand Central Parkway to access the Whitestone Expressway, and as a result, it frequently becomes congested. The efficient synchronization of the traffic lights minimize heavy delays, making this a popular alternate route to take instead of the Grand Central. The portion of Astoria Boulevard between roughly 31st and 78th Streets in Astoria serves as a frontage road, or service road for the Grand Central Parkway.

Between First and 31st Streets, it is a busy two lane road, with bidirectional traffic. Here most of the traffic is bound for either the Whitestone Expressway or the Grand Central Parkway.

== Transportation ==
Astoria Boulevard is served by the following bus and subway routes:

- The New York City Subway's BMT Astoria Line has a station on 31st Street, served by the N and W trains.
- The Q19 serves the entire boulevard east of 8th Street (Astoria), or Main Avenue (Flushing). Astoria service is absent from 31st Street to 21st Street.
- The Q33 to LaGuardia Airport uses the boulevard from 83rd Street to 85th Street.
- The Q47 to East Elmhurst uses the boulevard from 77th Street to Grand Central Parkway, and the Q47 to Glendale runs along it from 82nd Street to 80th Street.
- The Q49 to East Elmhurst uses the boulevard from 89th Street to 102nd Street, where it terminates, and the Q49 to Jackson Heights runs along it from Kearney Street to 92nd Street.
- The Q69 to Long Island City begins at 82nd Street and uses the boulevard to 78th Street.
- The Q90 uses the boulevard in both directions east of 111th Street.
- The M60 SBS runs between Hoyt Avenue and Grand Central Parkway.

== History ==
The road that was to become Astoria Boulevard was authorized to be laid out in 1835, and was to run from the head of Flushing Bay on the Flushing and Newtown Turnpike to Hallett's Cove, in what is now Astoria. The Astoria and Flushing Turnpike Company was then chartered in 1840 to toll the road, with a small extension. It was still known by this name at least to 1909. However, it was more commonly known as Flushing Avenue up to the 1920s, when it was renamed Astoria Boulevard.
