= Fort Tryon Jewish Center =

Synagogue in Manhattan, New York

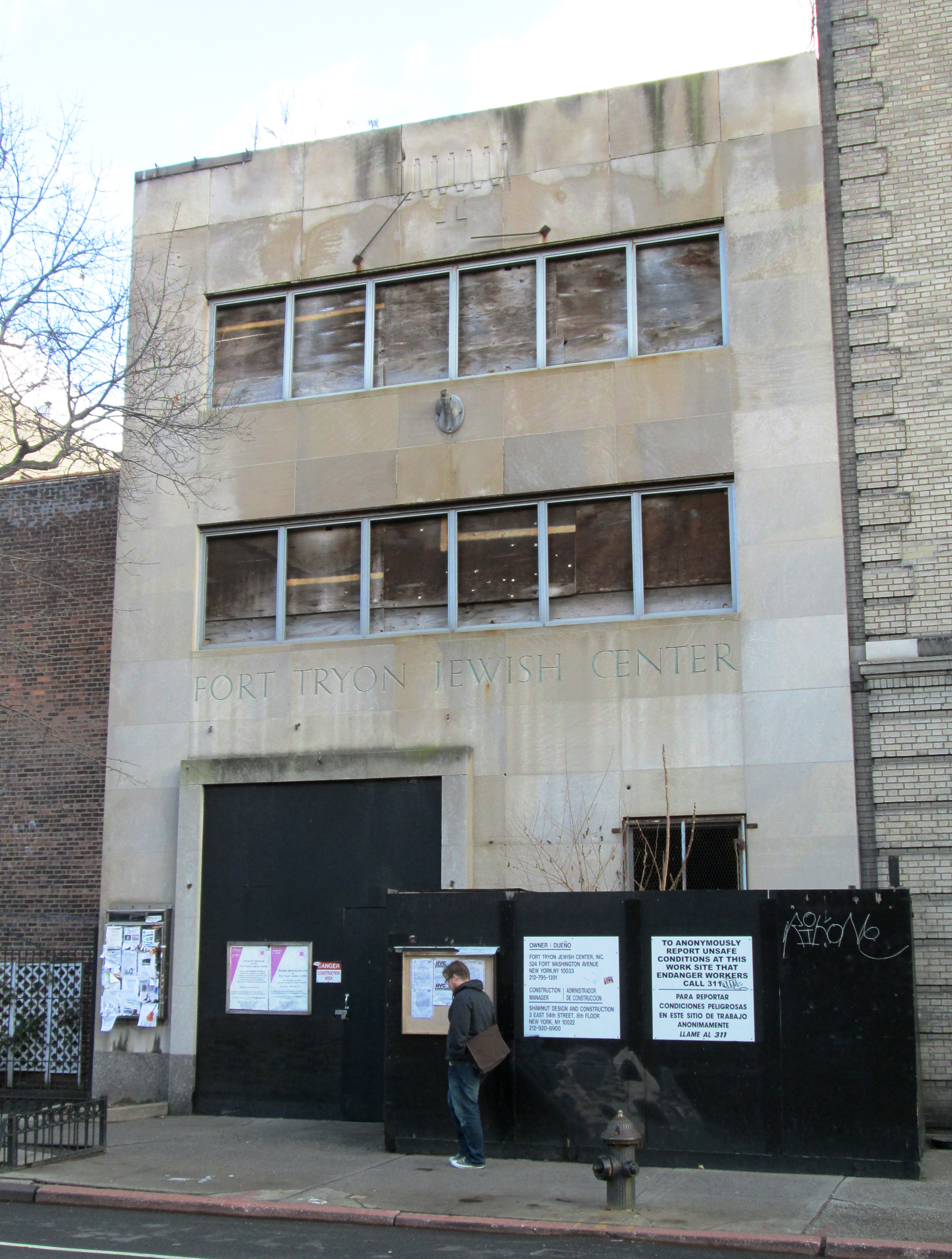
- Fort Tryon Jewish Center, in 2014

- Location in Upper Manhattan, New York City

Religion
- Affiliation: Conservative Judaism
- Ecclesiastical or organizational status: Synagogue
- Leadership: Rabbi Guy Austrian
- Status: Active

Location
- Location: 524 Fort Washington Avenue, Hudson Heights, Upper Manhattan, New York City, New York
- Country: United States
- Interactive map of Fort Tryon Jewish Center
- Coordinates: 40°51′10″N 73°56′15″W

Architecture
- Architect: N. J. Sapienza
- Type: Synagogue architecture
- Style: Modernist
- Established: 1938 (as a congregation)
- Completed: 1960

Website
- ftjc.org

The Fort Tryon Jewish Center is a Conservative Jewish congregation and synagogue, located at 524 Fort Washington Avenue between West 183rd and 184th Streets, across from Bennett Park in the Hudson Heights neighborhood of Upper Manhattan in New York City.

The rabbi, since January 2013, is Rabbi Guy Austrian.

== History ==
The congregation was founded in 1938 by long-time residents of the city and refugees from Nazi Germany. It first occupied leased space, building a modest facility in 1950, and then a spacious sanctuary that opened in 1960, designed by N. J. Sapienza in the Modernist style. The Torah Ark in the building has been described as "a gem of midcentury design." Stained glass windows designed by Juliene Berk, depicting the elements of the earth, lined the sanctuary. (The windows were removed and placed in storage in 2021.)

From 2002 on, the congregation grew as young families moved into the neighborhood.

=== Failed real estate deal ===
In an April 2014 article, the New York Times described a failed real estate transaction involving the Fort Tryon Jewish Center. The congregation signed an agreement with Rutherford Thompson of Thompson Development, which planned to build a 23-story condominium building to be called "One Bennett Park". Under the agreement, the developer would pay to completely renovate the synagogue in exchange for air rights and the right to situate a Fort Washington Avenue entrance to the residential tower on the congregation's property. According to The Real Deal magazine, a lawsuit filed in 2010 alleged that Thompson defaulted on the loan in February 2008. The synagogue was left in an unusable state, resulting in ongoing litigation, during which time the congregation met at Mother Cabrini High School, and its successor since September 2014, Success Academy Washington Heights. Since July 2015, the congregation has met in the Social Hall of the Hebrew Tabernacle at 551 Fort Washington Ave. In 2022 the congregation de-consecrated the Fort Washington Avenue synagogue after selling the property to the developer's bank.

== Gallery ==
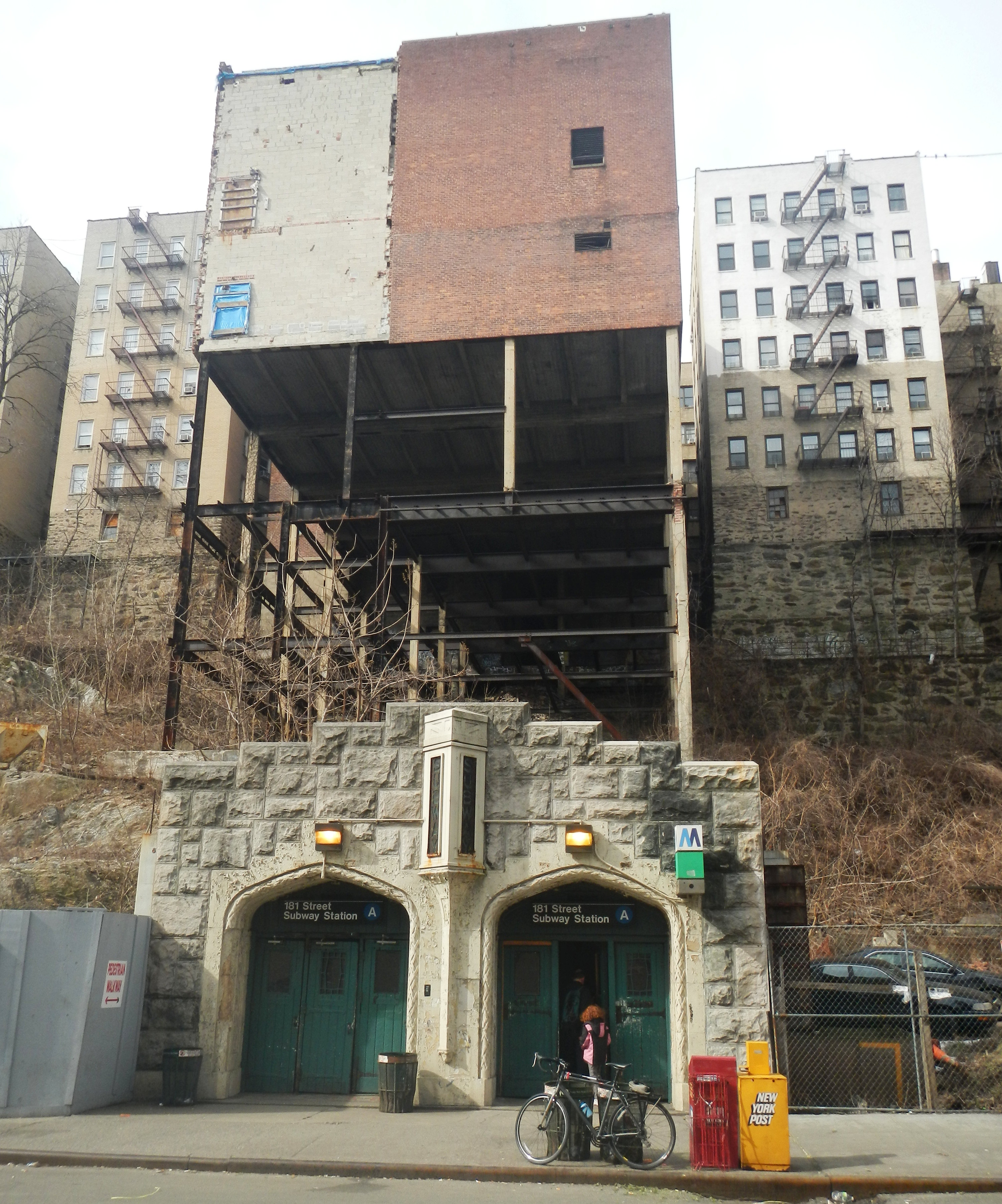
The rear of the building on pylons above the 181st Street subway entrance on Overlook Terrace at West 184th Street.
