= Plaza Lafayette =

Plaza in Manhattan, New York

Coordinates: 40°51′06″N 73°56′30″W

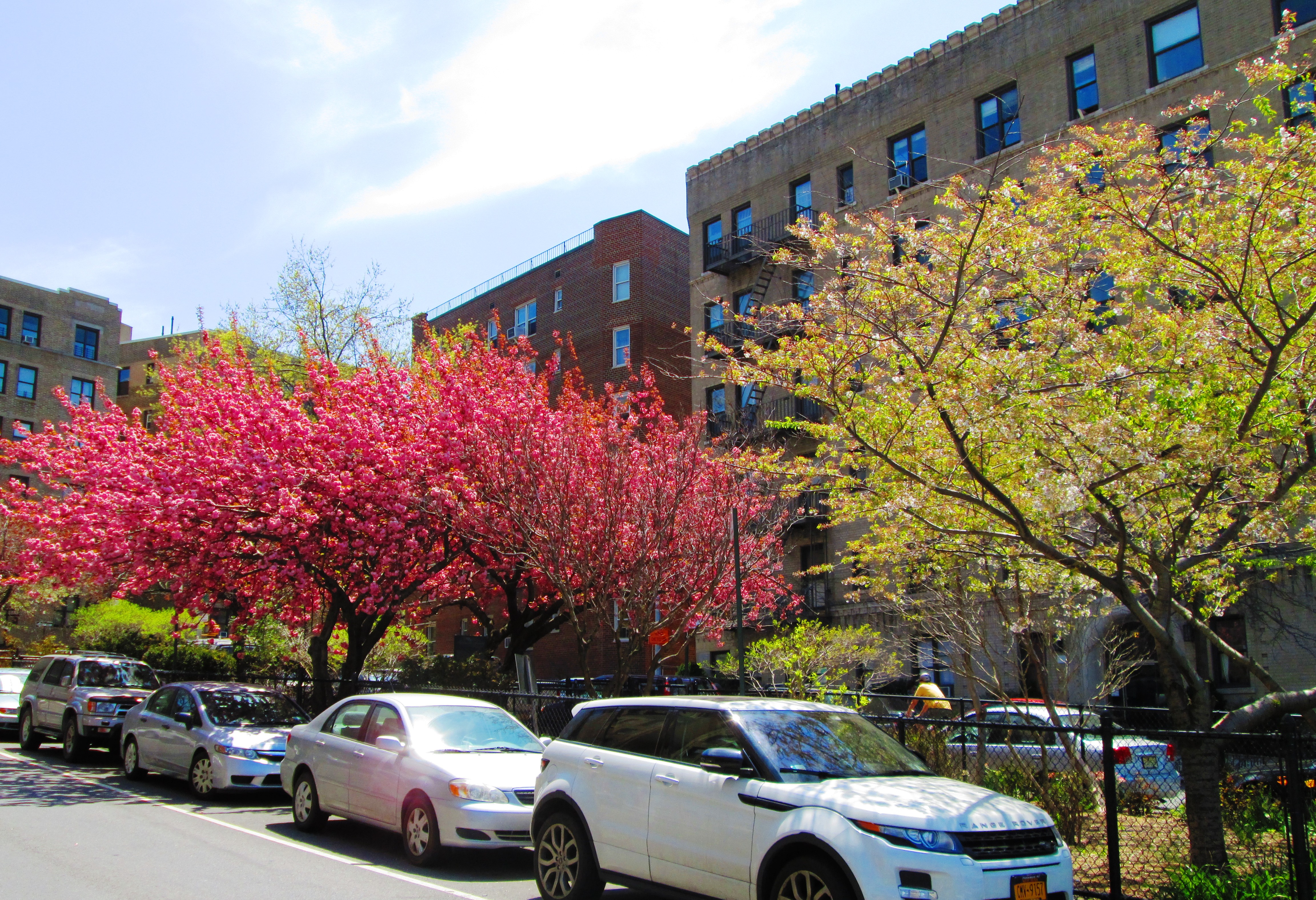
- seen from the northwest on West 181st Street

- Location within New York City
- Type: public
- Location: Hudson Heights, Manhattan, New York City
- Area: 0.09 acres (0.036 ha)
- Created: 1918
- Operator: New York City Department of Parks and Recreation

Plaza Lafayette is a 0.09-acre (0.036 ha) pocket park and surrounding streets in the Hudson Heights neighborhood of Washington Heights, Manhattan, New York City. Named after the Marquis de Lafayette, the French hero of the American Revolution, the park is roughly trapezoidal in shape, and is bounded by Riverside Drive – originally called Boulevard Lafayette in this area – on the west, the westbound lane of West 181st Street – also called "Plaza Lafayette" here – on the north, the eastbound lane of West 181st Street/Plaza Lafayette on the south, and Haven Avenue on the east. The land was acquired by the city on February 23, 1918.

The park itself has no amenities, but across what is now Riverside Drive is a small viewing area. This and the parklet itself are located near the highest natural point in Manhattan – about 5 block away in Bennett Park – and the viewing platform has unobstructed views of the George Washington Bridge, the Hudson Palisades, and the Hudson River.

The platform has stairs leading down to what is now the Henry Hudson Parkway, which was once Riverside Drive. The staircase is now gated off, but can still be seen from the Hudson River Greenway, on the other side of the parkway, which is reachable by a pedestrian bridge about a block north of the Plaza.

== Gallery ==
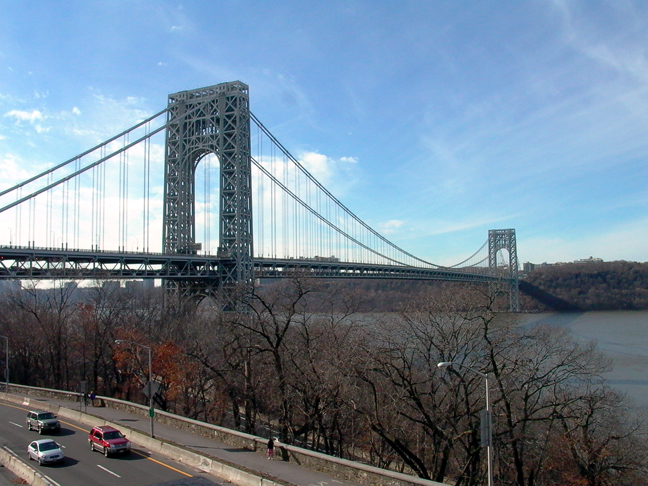
George Washington Bridge as seen from the Plaza's viewing platform

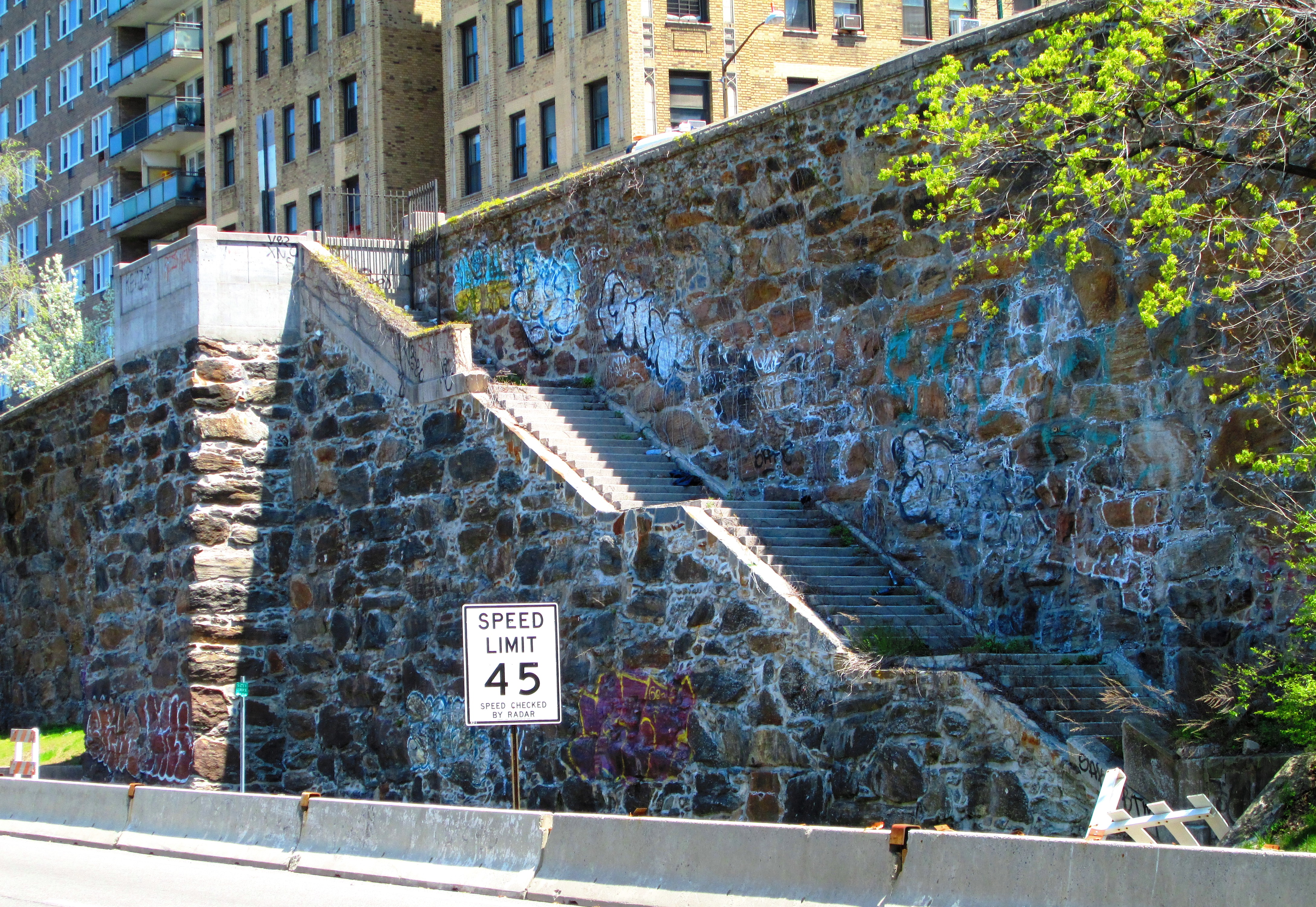
Now-disused staircase leading down from the viewing area to what was once Riverside Drive, but is now the northbound lanes of the Henry Hudson Parkway

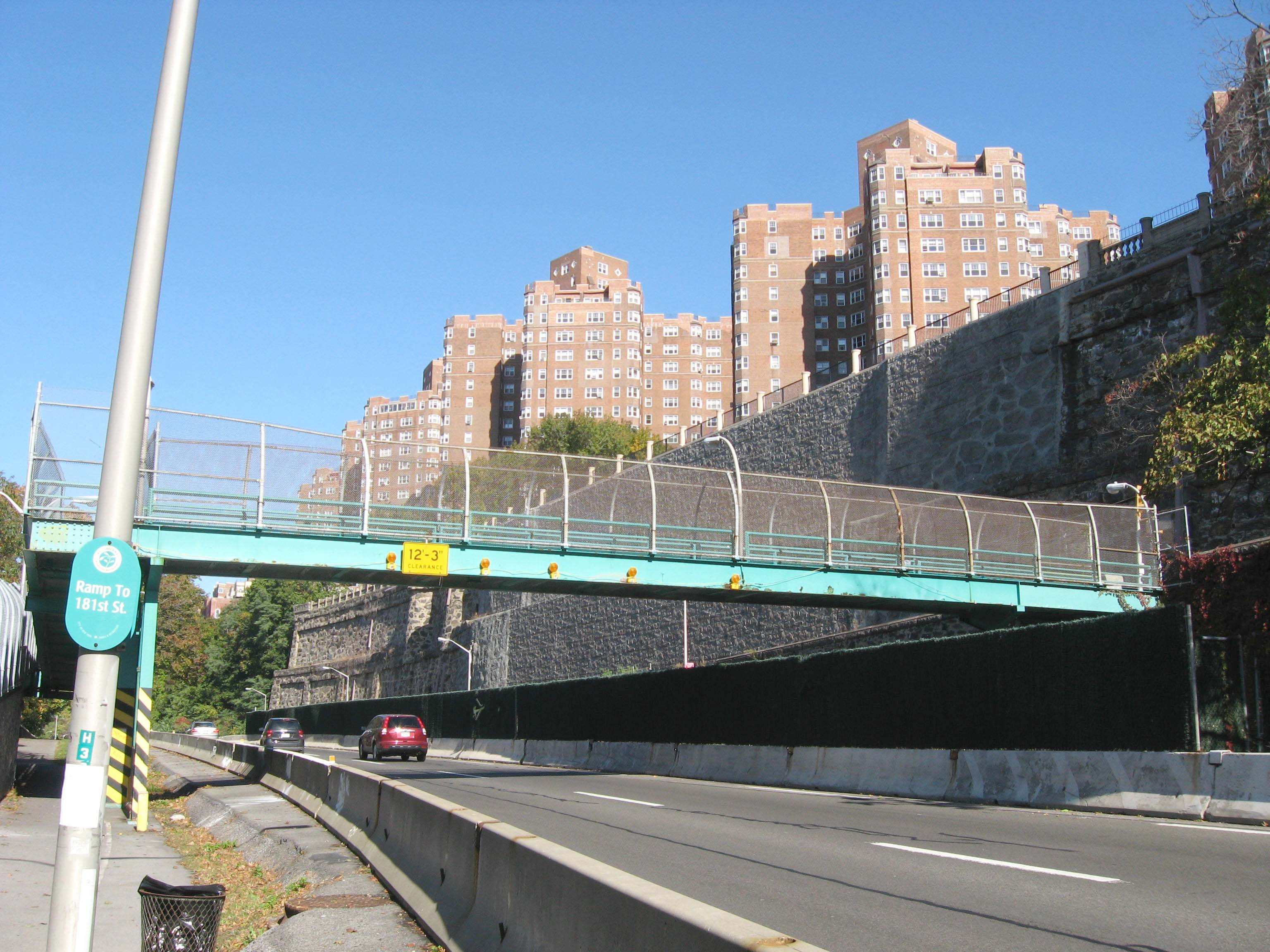
Pedestrian bridge over the parkway to the Hudson River Greenway, north of the Plaza, as seen from the Greenway; in the background is the Castle Village complex.
