= Hebrew Tabernacle of Washington Heights =

Reform synagogue in Manhattan, New York

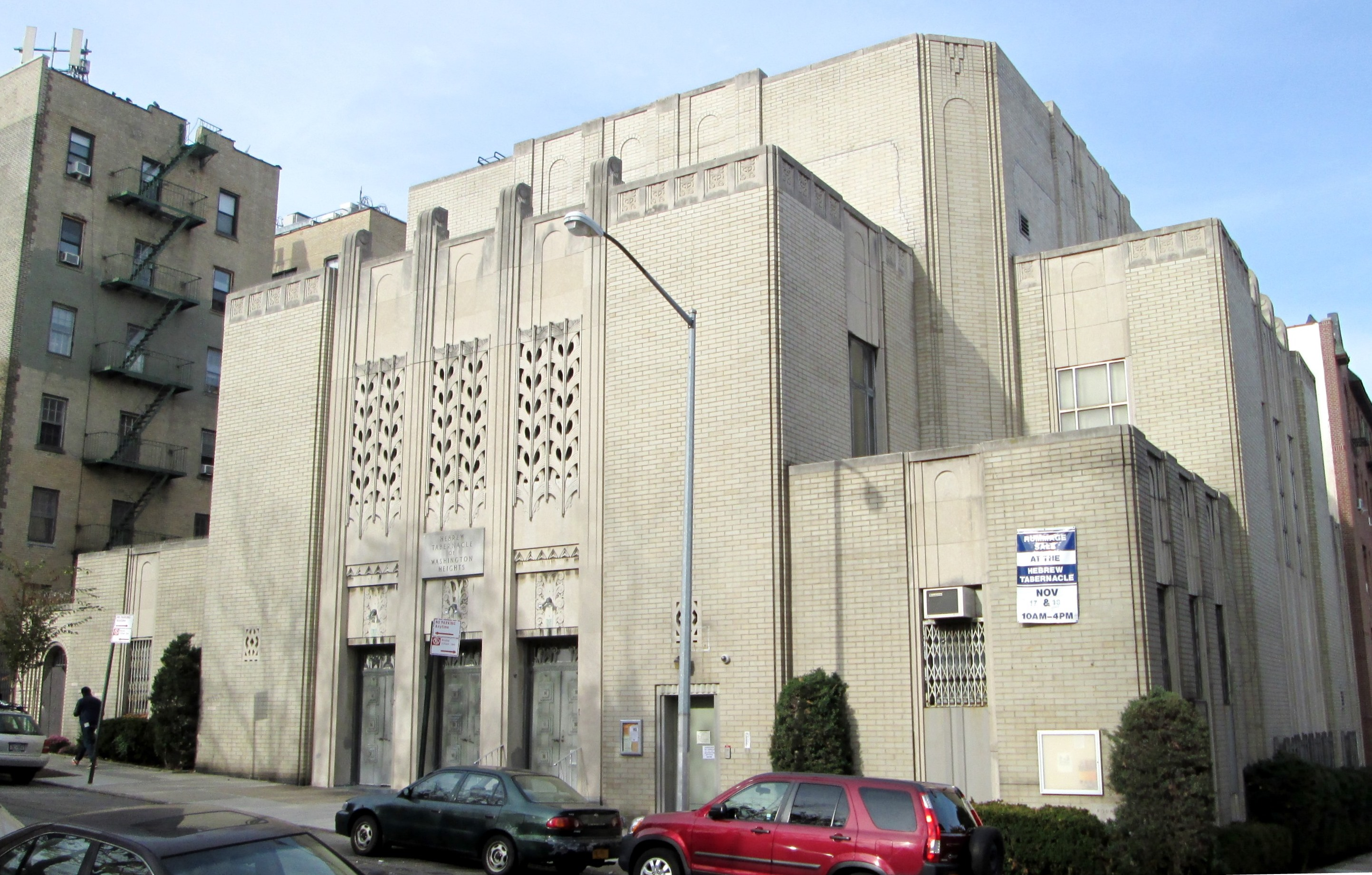

- Location in New York City

Religion
- Affiliation: Reform Judaism
- Ecclesiastical or organizational status: Church (1932–1973); Synagogue (since 1973)
- Leadership: Rabbi Paula Feldstein
- Status: Active

Location
- Location: 551 Fort Washington Avenue, Manhattan, New York City, New York
- Country: United States
- Interactive map of Hebrew Tabernacle of Washington Heights
- Coordinates: 40°51′13″N 73°56′15″W

Architecture
- Architects: William John Cherry; Herbert E. Matz
- Type: Church (original design)
- Style: Art Deco
- Established: 1905 (as a congregation)
- Completed: 1932 (as a church); 1973 (as a synagogue)
- Dome: One

Website
- hebrewtabernacle.org
- Fourth Church of Christ, Scientist, The
- U.S. National Register of Historic Places
- New York State Register of Historic Places
- NRHP reference No.: 11000620
- NYSRHP No.: 06101.018006

Significant dates
- Added to NRHP: August 31, 2011
- Designated NYSRHP: July 11, 2011

The Hebrew Tabernacle of Washington Heights is a historic Reform Jewish synagogue located at 551 Fort Washington Avenue, on the corner of 185th Street, in the Washington Heights neighborhood of Manhattan in New York City, New York, U.S. The domed Art Deco style building was built as a church for the Fourth Church of Christ, Scientist, in 1932 and converted to a synagogue in 1973.

== History as a church ==
The Fourth Church of Christ, Scientist was founded in 1896 as West Side Church of Christ, Scientist. Initially located in the Solon Spencer Beman-designed Neoclassical building at West 178th Street and Fort Washington Avenue, it sold the church building to provide land for the George Washington Bridge. The building at 551 Fort Washington Avenue, across from Bennett Park on West 185th Street, was designed by architects Cherry & Matz of Manhattan and built during the years 1931 to 1932. It is Art Deco, with a bold and chalky limestone facade, with stainless steel and brass.

The Fourth Church is no longer in existence.

== Synagogue ==
The Hebrew Tabernacle Congregation purchased the building in 1973, as the church faced a dwindling congregation and increasing costs, and the building became a synagogue. The Hebrew Tabernacle Congregation, founded in 1905 in Harlem by German-Jewish founders, had outgrown its 1920s building on West 161st Street between Broadway and Fort Washington Avenue, and its Jewish congregants there were becoming increasingly isolated.

As of 1982, many of the synagogue's members had come to New York in the 1930s as Jewish refugees from central Europe (in fact, so many German Jews were in the neighborhood, that it was jokingly referred to as "Frankfurt on the Hudson"), and the synagogue had 500 families as members. The congregation is a member of the Union for Reform Judaism.

On August 31, 2011, the building was added to the National Register of Historic Places.

== Notable members ==
- Mark Levine, New York City Council member for the 7th district, nominee for Manhattan Borough President
- Ruth Westheimer, commonly known as "Dr. Ruth", German-American sex therapist, talk show host, author, professor, and Holocaust survivor

== See also ==
- National Register of Historic Places listings in Manhattan above 110th Street
- List of former Christian Science churches, societies and buildings
