= 181st Street station =

181st Street station may refer to:

- 181st Street (IND Eighth Avenue Line), a station on the IND Eighth Avenue Line
- 181st Street (IRT Broadway–Seventh Avenue Line), a station on the IRT Broadway–Seventh Avenue Line
