= 181st Street (disambiguation) =

181st Street is a major thoroughfare in New York City.

181st Street may also refer to:

- 181st Street (IND Eighth Avenue Line)
- 181st Street (IRT Broadway – Seventh Avenue Line)
