= 190th Street station =

New York City Subway station in Manhattan

190 Street
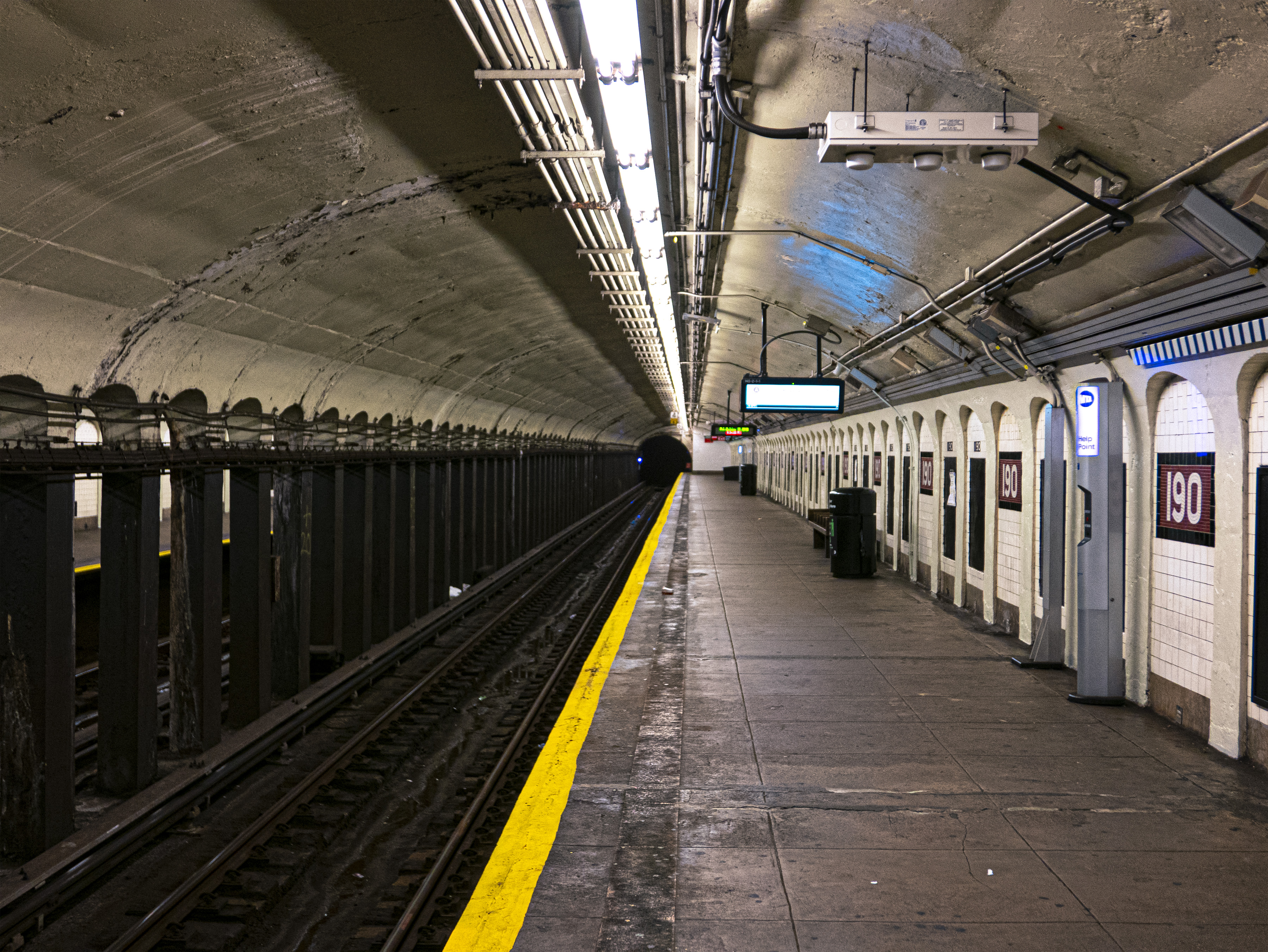
- Southbound platform

Station statistics
- Address: West 190th Street & Fort Washington Avenue; New York, New York
- Borough: Manhattan
- Locale: Washington Heights, Hudson Heights
- Coordinates: 40.8590°N 73.9340°W
- Division: B (IND)
- Line: IND Eighth Avenue Line
- Services: A (all times)
- Transit: NYCT Bus: M4, M98
- Structure: Underground
- Depth: 140 feet (43 m)
- Platforms: 2 side platforms
- Tracks: 2

Other information
- Opened: September 10, 1932 (94 years ago)
- Accessible: Partially; access to mezzanine only, access to platforms planned
- Former/other names: 190th Street–Overlook Terrace
- Other entrances/ exits: east side of Fort Washington Avenue, west side of Bennett Avenue

Traffic
- 2025: 965,088 ▼2.9%
- Rank: 317 out of 423
Services
Preceding station	New York City Subway	Following station
Dyckman Street toward Inwood–207th Street	A (New York City Subway service)	181st Street toward Far Rockaway–Mott Avenue or Ozone Park–Lefferts Boulevard
Location
Location within New York City Subway
Location within New York City
Location within New York
Track layout
Street map
Station service legend
Symbol	Description
Stops all times	Stops all times
- 190th Street Subway Station (IND) (190th Street-Overlook Terrace Subway Station)
- U.S. National Register of Historic Places
- New York State Register of Historic Places
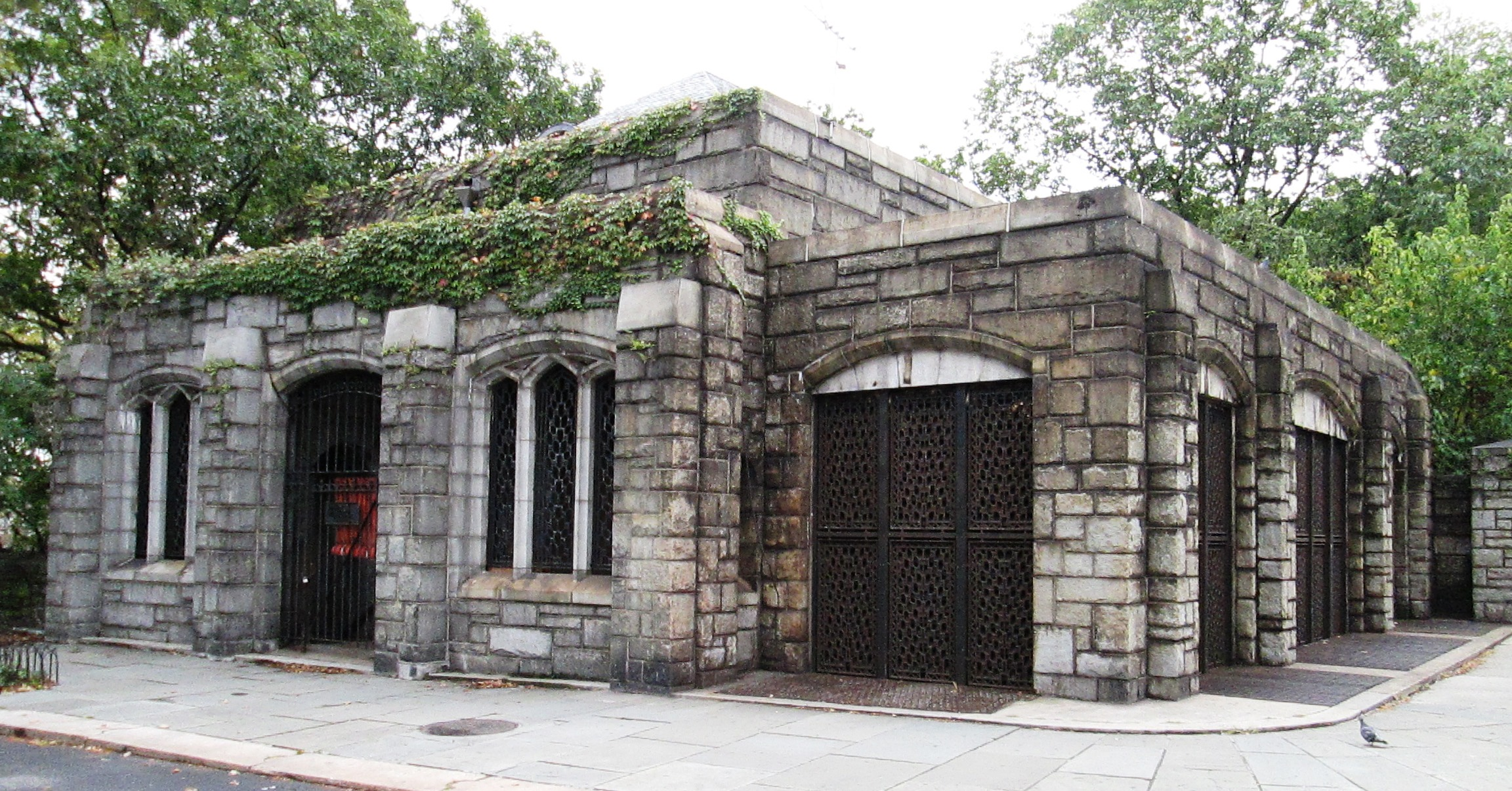
- Ft. Washington Ave. entrance building (2014)
- MPS: New York City Subway System MPS
- NRHP reference No.: 05000225
- NYSRHP No.: 06101.007657

Significant dates
- Added to NRHP: March 30, 2005
- Designated NYSRHP: December 18, 2004

The 190th Street station (originally 190th Street–Overlook Terrace) is a station on the IND Eighth Avenue Line of the New York City Subway, served by the A train at all times. It is located on Fort Washington Avenue in the Hudson Heights section of Manhattan's Washington Heights neighborhood, near the avenue's intersection with Cabrini Boulevard at Margaret Corbin Circle, about three blocks north of 190th Street.

The 190th Street station opened in 1932 and has two tracks and two side platforms. It is close to Fort Tryon Park with the Cloisters medieval art museum, and the Mother Cabrini Shrine. An additional exit through the side of the hill leads to Bennett Avenue and provides access to the Broadway Valley area of Washington Heights. The station is listed on the National Register of Historic Places.

== History ==
=== Construction and opening ===
New York City mayor John Francis Hylan's original plans for the Independent Subway System (IND), proposed in 1922, included building over 100 miles (160 km) of new lines and taking over nearly 100 miles (160 km) of existing lines. The lines were designed to compete with the existing underground, surface, and elevated lines operated by the Interborough Rapid Transit Company (IRT) and BMT. On December 9, 1924, the New York City Board of Transportation (BOT) gave preliminary approval for the construction of the IND Eighth Avenue Line. This line consisted of a corridor connecting Inwood, Manhattan, to Downtown Brooklyn, running largely under Eighth Avenue but also paralleling Greenwich Avenue and Sixth Avenue in Lower Manhattan. The BOT announced a list of stations on the new line in February 1928, with a station at 190th Street.

The BOT began constructing the 190th Street station in 1928. Squire J. Vickers, the chief architect of the Dual System, helped design the 190th Street station. He was responsible for most stations on the Independent Subway System (IND), and being a painter, he did tile work for the station. Robert Ridgway was hired as the chief engineer. The finishes at the five stations between 175th and 207th Street, including the 190th Street station, were 18 percent completed by May 1930. By that August, the BOT reported that the Eighth Avenue Line was nearly completed and that the stations from 116th to 207th Street were 99.9 percent completed. The entire line was completed by September 1931, except for the installation of turnstiles.

A preview event for the new subway was hosted on September 8, 1932, two days before the official opening. The 190th Street station opened on September 10, 1932, as part of the city-operated IND's initial segment, the Eighth Avenue Line between Chambers Street and 207th Street. Construction of the whole line cost $191.2 million. Service at this station was provided with express service from its onset. While the IRT Broadway–Seventh Avenue Line already provided service to Washington Heights, the new subway via Fort Washington Avenue made subway service more readily accessible. Its opening resulted in the development of residential apartment buildings south of the station.

=== Operation ===
On December 28, 1950, the Board of Transportation issued a report concerning the construction of bomb shelters in the subway system. Five deep stations in Washington Heights, including the 190th Street station, were considered to be ideal for being used as bomb-proof shelters. The program was expected to cost $104 million (equivalent to $1.392 billion in 2025). These shelters were expected to provide limited protection against conventional bombs, while providing protection against shock waves and air blast, as well as from the heat and radiation from an atomic bomb. To become suitable as shelters, the stations would require water-supply facilities, first-aid rooms, and additional bathrooms. However, the program, which required federal funding, was never completed.

In 1951, researchers from New York University concluded that in the event of a nuclear attack, the 190th Street station would provide adequate shelter from fallout. This was ascertained after the researchers conducted tests on cosmic rays inside deep subway stations in the area.

The 190th Street station is mostly unchanged from its original design. On March 30, 2005, the 190th Street station was listed on the National Register of Historic Places (NRHP). The station was considered historically and architecturally significant as an early IND station that retained many of its original features. In 2023, the MTA began planning to renovate the Chambers Street and 190th Street stations for a combined $100 million; the work would involve "historically sensitive" repairs, as both stations are on the NRHP. The project was to be funded by congestion pricing in New York City, but the renovation was postponed in June 2024 after the implementation of congestion pricing was delayed.

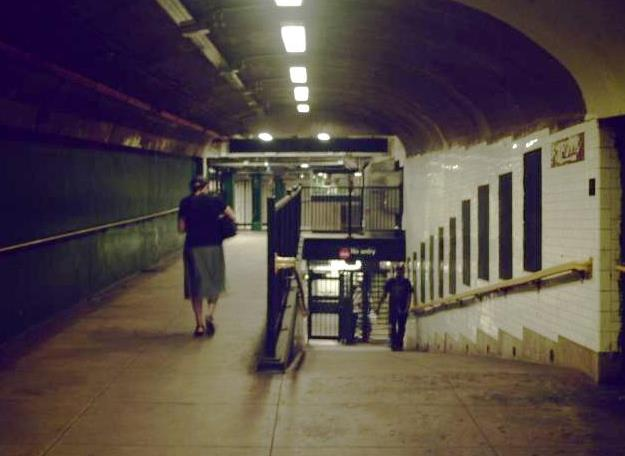
Tunnel to fare control from Bennett Avenue

=== Elevator modifications ===
From 1932 until 1957, pedestrians had to pay a fare to use the elevators. Though the elevators were intended for subway riders, local residents paid the subway fare to avoid climbing about eight stories up Fort Washington Hill. Bills were proposed in the New York State Legislature to put the elevators out of fare control, but these failed in committee. On September 5, 1957, the New York City Transit Authority (NYCTA) began allowing free public access to the elevators at the 181st and 190th Street stations. The NYCTA agreed once Joseph Zaretzki, the local State Senator, requested the change.

Several of the elevators in the station are staffed by elevator attendants, who are also employed at four other deep-level stations in Washington Heights. The elevator attendants are intended to reassure passengers, as the elevators are the only entrance to the platforms, and passengers often wait for the elevators with an attendant. The attendants at the five stations are primarily maintenance and cleaning workers who suffered injuries that made it hard for them to continue doing their original jobs. In July 2003, to reduce costs, the Metropolitan Transportation Authority (MTA) announced that as part of its 2004 budget it would eliminate 22 elevator operator positions at the 190th Street station and four others in Washington Heights, leaving one full-time operator per station. The agency had intended to remove all the attendants at these stops, but kept one in each station after many riders protested. In addition, the MTA began operating all elevators at all times; prior to the change, each elevator only operated if it was staffed by an elevator operator. The change took effect on January 20, 2004, and was expected to save $1.15 million a year.

In November 2007, the MTA proposed savings cuts to help reduce the agency's deficit. As part of the plan, all elevator operators at 190th Street, along with those in four other stations in Washington Heights, would have been cut. MTA employees had joined riders in worrying about an increase in crime as a result of the cuts after an elevator operator at 181st Street on the Broadway–Seventh Avenue Line helped save a stabbed passenger. The move was intended to save $1.7 million a year. However, on December 7, 2007, the MTA announced that it would not remove the remaining elevator operators at these stations, due to pushback from elected officials and residents from the area. In October 2018, the MTA once again proposed removing the elevator operators at the five stations, but this was reversed after dissent from the Transport Workers' Union. The MTA again suggested reassigning elevator operators to station-cleaner positions in June 2023, prompting local politicians to sue to prevent the operators' reassignments.

This station's elevators were closed for elevator replacement on August 29, 2020, but the station remained open via the exit to Bennett Avenue. The elevators were scheduled to reopen in September 2021. Some of the elevators reopened on November 30, 2021; the reopening was pushed back due to unexpected structural issues. In July 2025, the MTA announced that it would install elevators at 12 stations, including mezzanine-to-platform elevators at the 190th Street station, as part of its 2025–2029 capital program. The elevators would make the station fully compliant with the Americans with Disabilities Act of 1990.

== Station layout ==
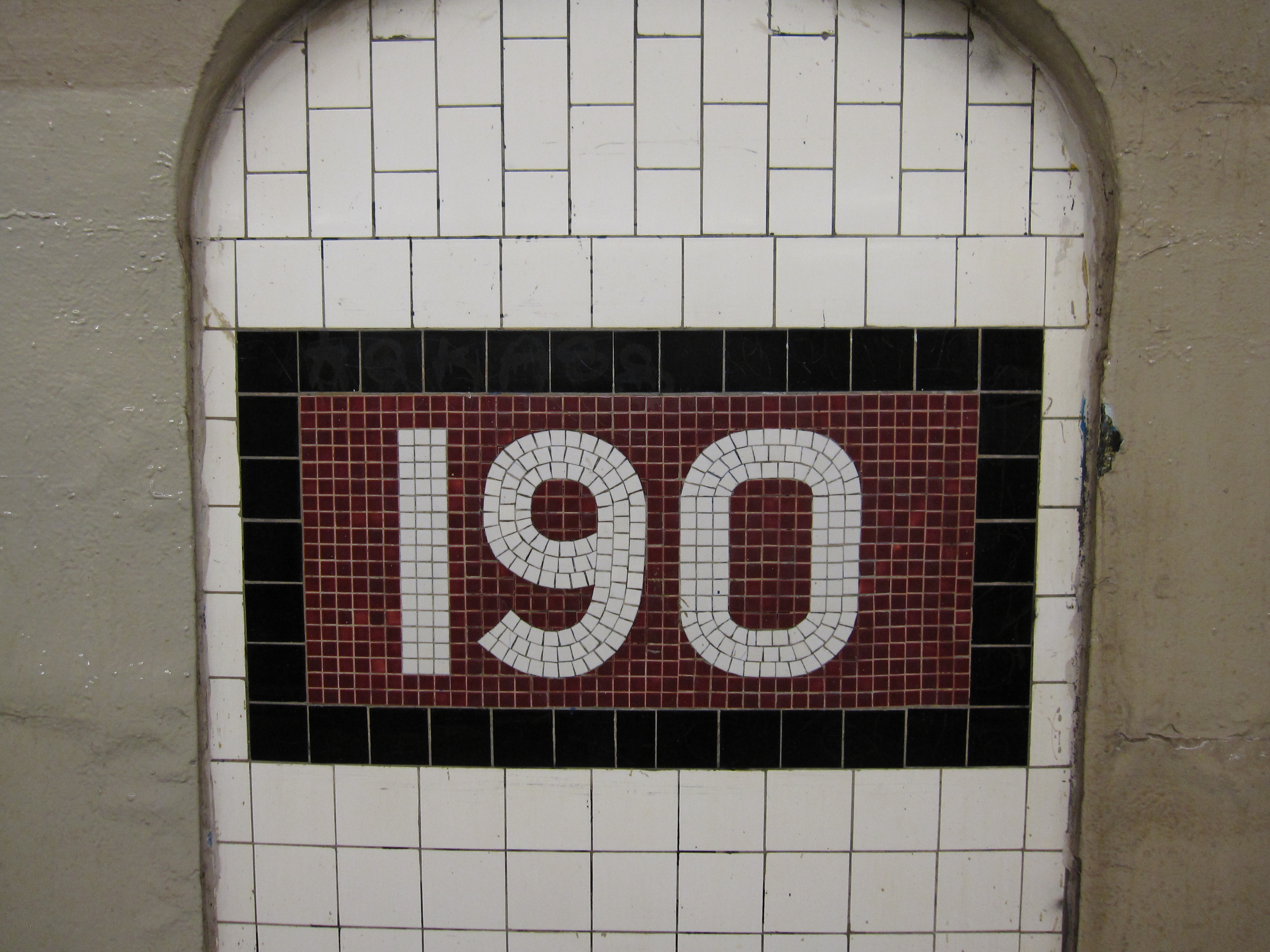
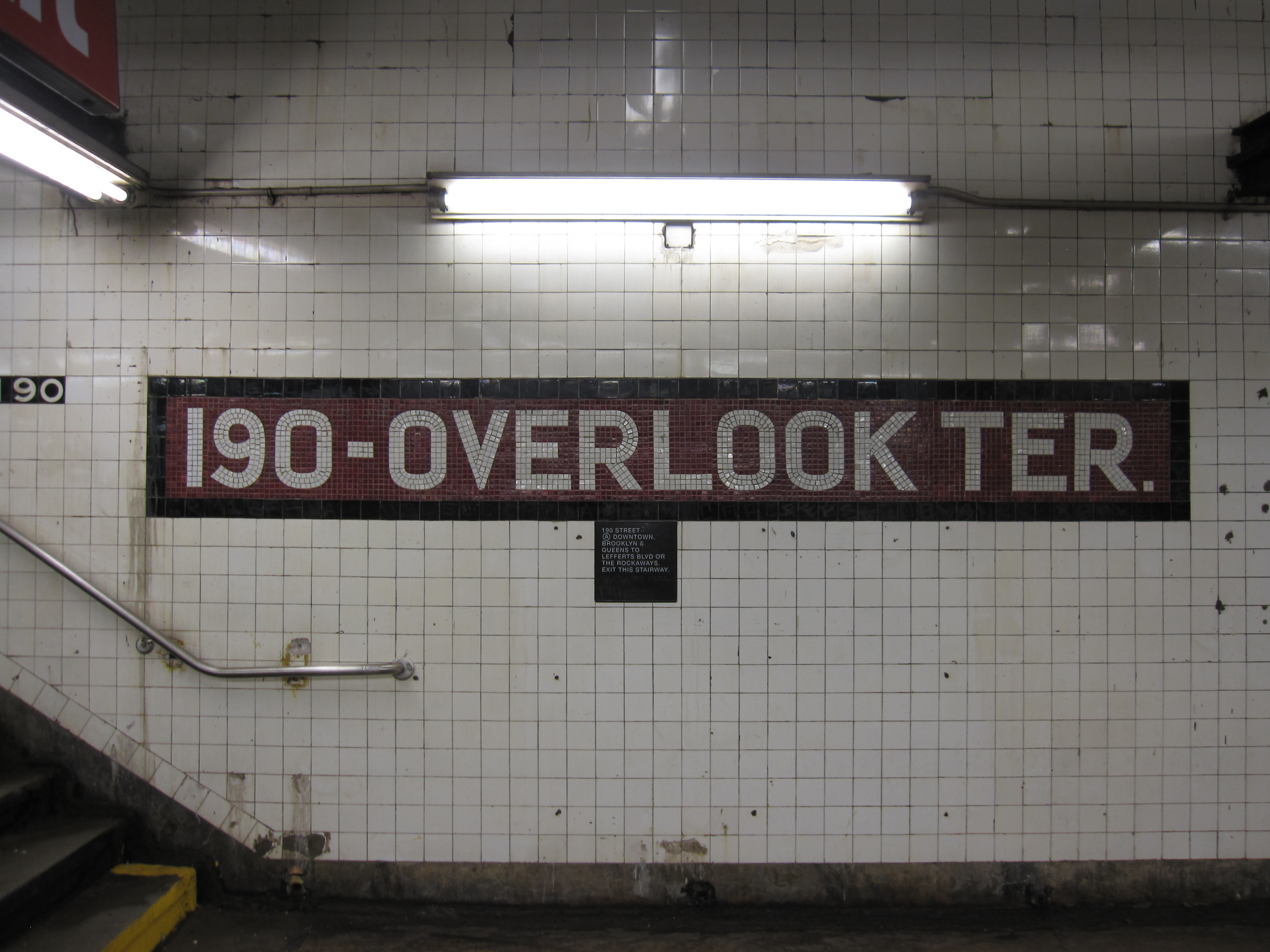
Mosaics within the alcove (top) and at the bottom of the stairs (bottom)

The station has two tracks and two side platforms. It is the third-to-last station on the IND Eighth Avenue Line proceeding northbound. The station is served by the A train at all times; the next station northbound is Dyckman Street while the next station southbound is 181st Street. The station's platforms are 660 feet (200 m) long, a typical length of station platforms built by the Independent Subway System, and the station itself is 50 feet (15 m) wide. The platform level contains a double-barrel-vaulted ceiling supported by an arcade in the center. The ceiling is relatively low, in contrast to other nearby deep-level stations such as 181st Street or 168th Street stations on the IRT Broadway–Seventh Avenue Line, where the vaults are larger.

The outer walls of the platform level consist of tiled alcoves, slightly recessed within concrete arches. The station's tiles are colored maroon. This was part of a color-coded tile system used throughout the IND. The tile colors were designed to facilitate navigation for travelers going away from Lower Manhattan. As such, the maroon tiles used at the 190th Street station are also used at 168th Street, the first express station to the south, as well as at other stations on the Eighth Avenue Line north of 168th Street. Maroon-and-black plaques with white sans-serif lettering reading "190-OVERLOOK TER." are located on the walls nearest the stairways to the mezzanine. Smaller maroon, black, and white mosaics with the number "190" are located within some of the alcoves. Within the alcoves that do not contain the "190" mosaic, there are black tiles with white numerals reading "190". The remaining tiling in the alcoves is white. A ramp leads from the northbound platform to an exit passageway leading to Bennett Avenue.

A small concrete-floored mezzanine is located above the platforms toward the northern end of the station. The portion of the mezzanine above the platforms has metal railings on its northern and southern sides, from which the platforms can be seen. The rest of the mezzanine has white tiled walls. Two stairs descend from the mezzanine to each platform. There is also a station-agent booth on the northern wall.

Located 140 feet (43 m) below ground level, it is one of the deepest stations in the entire system by distance to ground level; it is even deeper than the 34th Street–Hudson Yards station, the deepest station in the system by elevation below sea level. (Note: By comparison, 34th Street–Hudson Yards is only 110 feet (34 m) below the surface, which is about 15 to 20 feet (4.6 to 6.1 m) above sea level.) Although this is an extremely deep station, the Bennett Avenue entrance is at a lower elevation than the mezzanine, so the exit passageway slopes down. Additionally, Dyckman Street, the next station north, is only one level below the surface, in contrast to the 190th Street station.

=== Entrances and exits ===
Contrary to the station's name, there are no exits to either 190th Street or Overlook Terrace. However, the station has entrances both to Hudson Heights, on top of the ridge, and to Bennett Avenue in the valley of Washington Heights, on the bottom.

A tunnel leading eastward from the station provides access to Bennett Avenue, midblock between Broadway and 192nd Street, with an entrance built right into the rock face. The 207th Street-bound platform contains an exit-only (one turnstile and one gate) ramp that bypasses fare control and leads to the passageway to the Bennett Avenue entrance. Passengers used to be able to enter the station from the ramp, which is evidenced by tiled mosaics.

The entrance at the top of the ridge is a head house located at the end of Fort Washington Avenue, at Margaret Corbin Circle. The station was built while the Cloisters in Fort Tryon Park were under construction, making it possible for the head house to have a stone facade to harmonize it with the entrance to the Cloisters several hundred feet north of the station's entrance. The head house is a single-story rectangular stone building with a black hip roof. The longer sides are on the western and eastern elevations, and each contain three bays. The northern elevation contains three small arches, of which the center arch contained a doorway into the head house. The southern elevation is abutted by stone stairs leading down to the station's elevators and a play area within Fort Tryon Park. A lamppost and a steel sign with the word "SUBWAY" is located on the sidewalk of Fort Washington Avenue at the top of these stairs.

=== Elevators ===
The station maintains three elevators from the mezzanine in one tower at its eastern end, and has done so since its opening. The elevators lead upward to the basement of the Fort Washington Avenue head house. The head house basement contains brick walls and a concrete floor and ceiling, and formerly contained a token booth. The elevators were formerly only open during the daytime, and required the payment of a fare to use since the fare control for both street entrances to the station was originally located just inside the street doors. Since 1957, the elevators have been available for use by pedestrians going between Bennett Avenue and Fort Washington Avenue without paying a fare; a similar situation exists at 181st Street, the next station downtown, as well as at 191st Street on the IRT Broadway–Seventh Avenue Line. The elevators to the mezzanine still utilize elevator operators, one of the few stations in the system to do so.

The station is not compliant with the Americans with Disabilities Act of 1990, because it cannot be used by passengers with wheelchairs since access from the fare control area to the platforms is only possible via stairways. Additionally, the elevators as well as the free out-of-system traverse between Fort Washington and Bennett Avenues are not ADA-compliant for wheelchair users either (unlike at 181st Street), since the entrance to the former is only accessible by several flights of stairs, and another smaller staircase exists between the end of the passageway and the Bennett Avenue exit. There is a staircase available in case of an emergency.

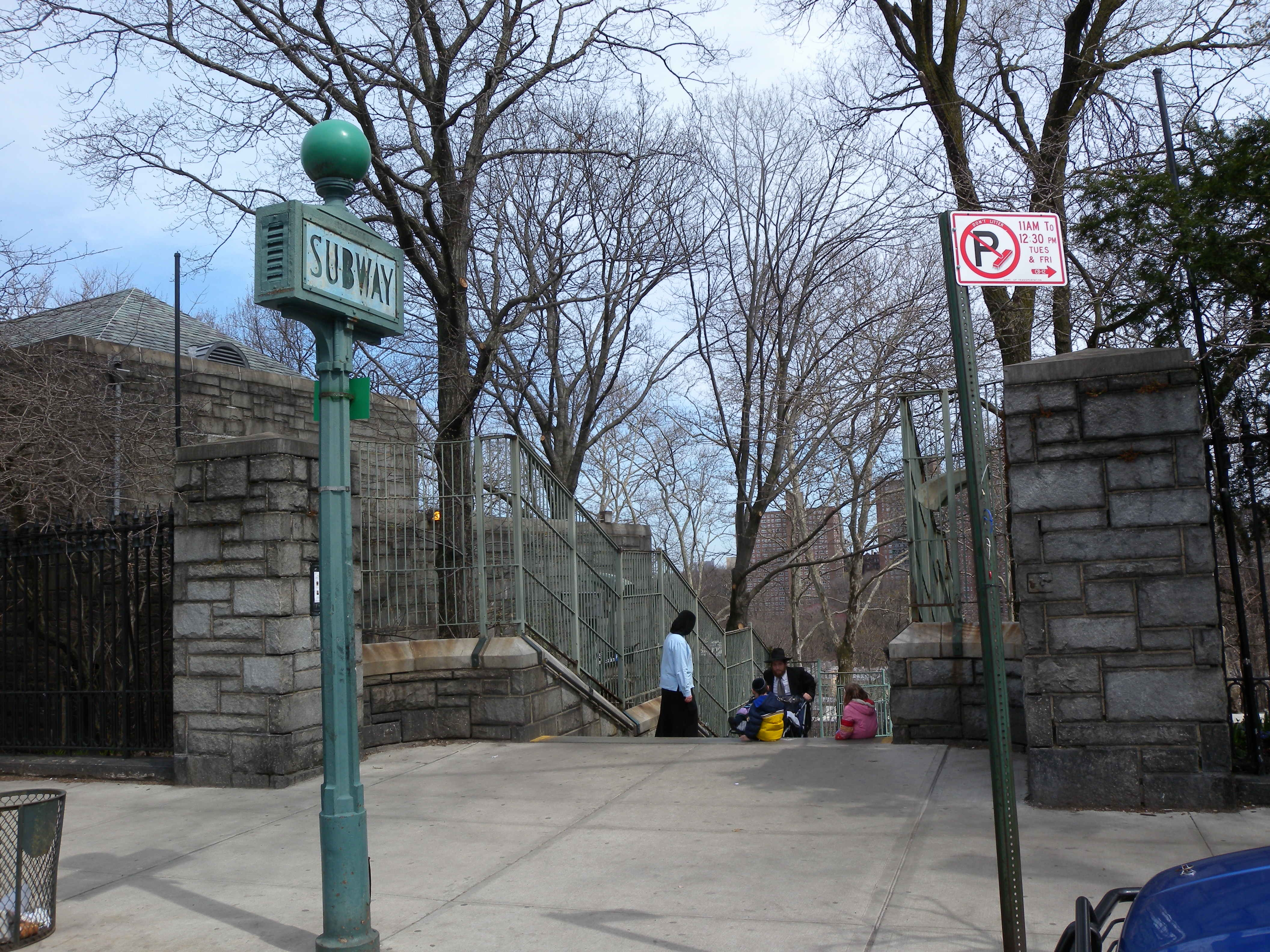
Fort Washington Avenue entrance

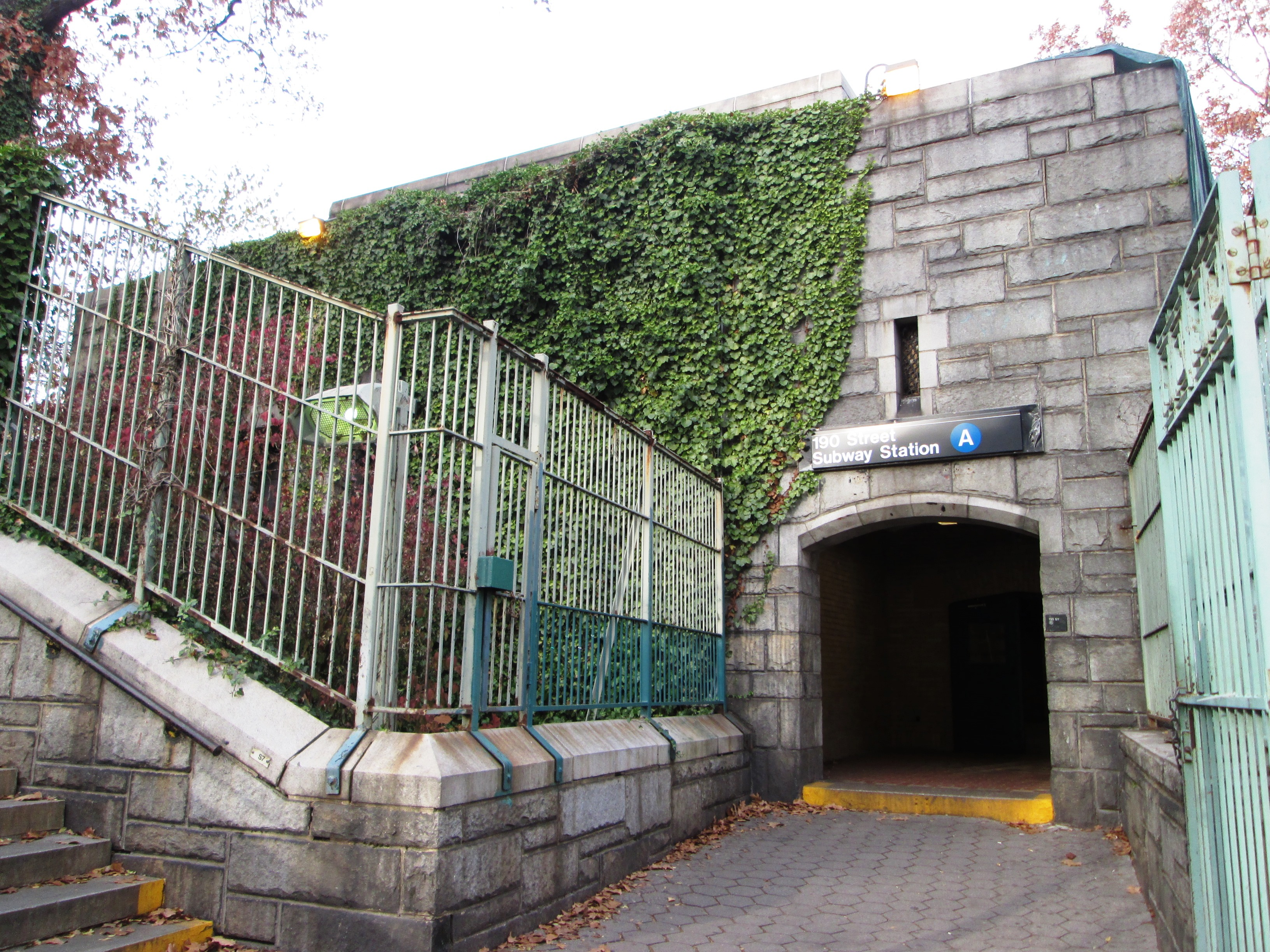
Stairs to Fort Washington Avenue entrance

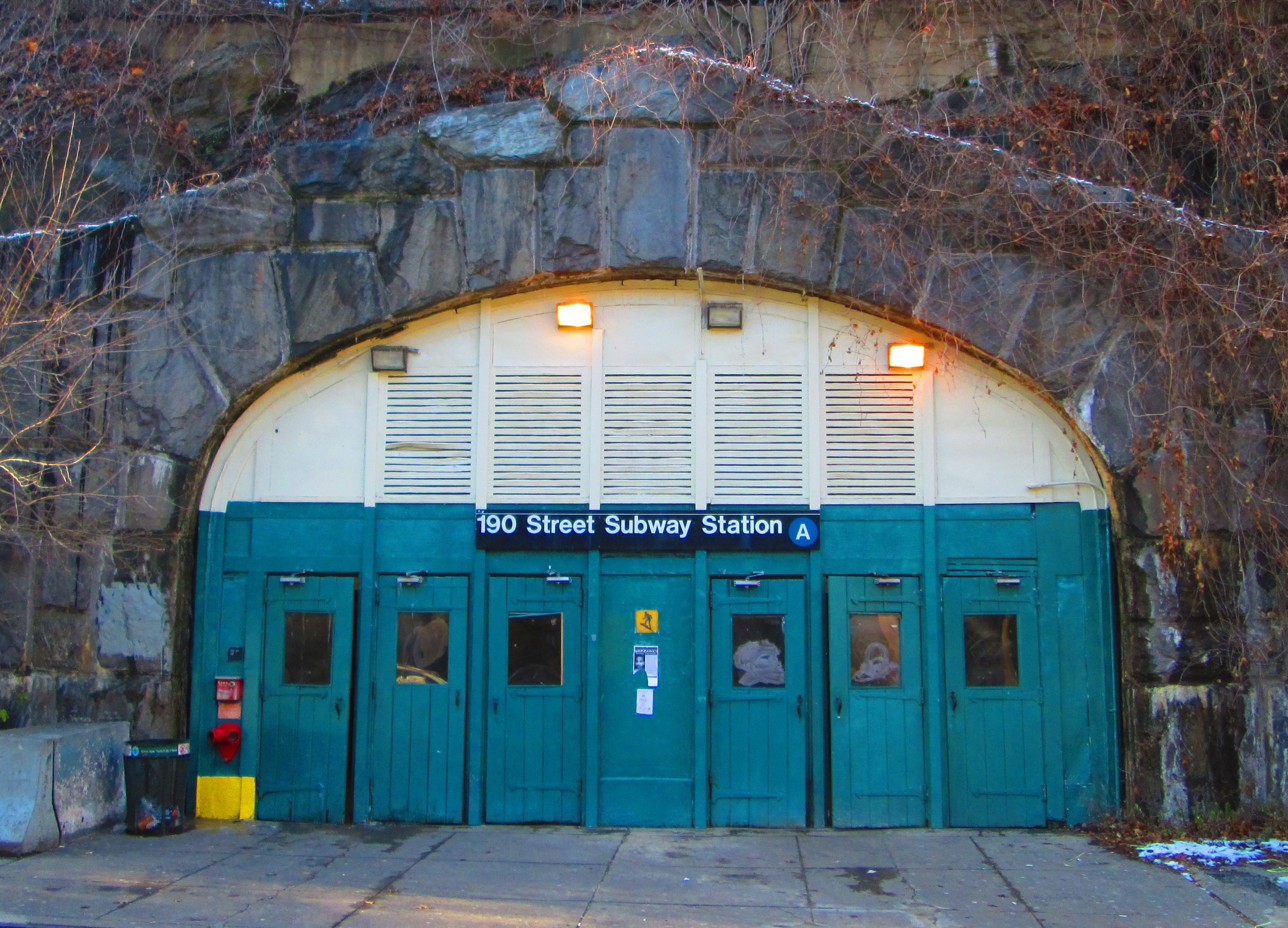
Bennett Avenue entrance

== See also ==
- National Register of Historic Places listings in Manhattan above 110th Street
