= Squire J. Vickers =

American architect (1872–1947)

Squire Joseph Vickers (1872–1947) was an "underground Renaissance man", according to The New York Times. He was a chief architect of the New York City Subway system.

Vickers began work in the Interborough Rapid Transit Company in 1906, as a young architect, and worked for 36 years, until 1942. A 2007 show organized by the New York Transit Museum described how he was responsible for more than 300 New York City Subway stations, the most of any architect. He was the system's lead designer for almost 30 years.

Vickers was also an accomplished painter.

== Works ==
His works include several New York City Subway stations on the U.S. National Register of Historic Places.

In Manhattan:

- 181st Street station (IND Eighth Avenue Line), Fort Washington Avenue between 185th and 181st Streets; A train
- 190th Street station (IND Eighth Avenue Line), under Fort Washington Avenue between Fort Tryon Park (Cabrini Boulevard) and W. 190th Street; A train
- 86th Street station (IRT Lexington Avenue Line), under Lexington Avenue, between 85th and 87th Streets; 4, 5, 6, and <6> trains
- 28th Street station (IRT Broadway–Seventh Avenue Line), Seventh Avenue between 26th and 29th Streets; 1 and 2 trains
- West Fourth Street–Washington Square station (IND Sixth Avenue and Eighth Avenue Lines), under Sixth Avenue between W. 3rd Street and Waverly Place; A, B, C, D, E, F, <F>, and M trains
- Chambers Street station (IRT Broadway–Seventh Avenue Line), under West Broadway between Warren, Chambers and Reade Streets; 1, 2, and 3 trains
- Times Square-42nd Street station, (intersection of 42nd Street, Seventh Avenue and Broadway); Vickers installed at least two Confederate Flags in the tile here
- The Central IND Substation, while not a station, is also on the National Register of Historic Places.

In Brooklyn:

- Ninth Avenue station (BMT West End Line), 38th Street and Ninth Avenue near the junction of New Utrecht Avenue; D, R, and W trains
- Avenue U station (BMT Sea Beach Line), between Avenue U and Avenue T and Seventh and Eighth Streets; N and W trains
- Bay Parkway station (BMT West End Line), above Bay Parkway at 86th Street; D, R, and W trains
- New Utrecht Avenue station (BMT Sea Beach Line), beneath the junction of New Utrecht Avenue with 15th Avenue and 62nd Street; N and W trains
- Ocean Parkway station (BMT Brighton Line), above the junction of Brighton Beach Avenue and Ocean Parkway; Q train
- Wilson Avenue station (BMT Canarsie Line), Chauncey Street at Wilson Avenue; L train

In the Bronx:

- Pelham Parkway station (IRT White Plains Road Line), junction of White Plains Road and Pelham Parkway; 2 and 5 trains
- Westchester Square–East Tremont Avenue station (IRT Pelham Line), above Westchester Avenue, from Overing Street to Ferris Place; 6 and <6> trains
- Woodlawn station (IRT Jerome Avenue Line), junction of Bainbridge Avenue and Jerome Avenue; 4 train

In Queens:

- Court Square station (IRT Flushing Line), above 23rd Street between 44th Drive and 45th Road, Long Island City; 7 and <7> trains
- Flushing–Main Street station (IRT Flushing Line), near junction of Roosevelt Avenue and Main Street, Flushing; 7 and <7> trains

== See also ==
- New York City Subway tiles
