= Edith Prentiss =

American disability rights activist (1952–2021)

- Born: February 1, 1952; Central Islip, New York, US
- Died: March 16, 2021 (aged 69); New York City, US
- Education: Stony Brook University & Miami University
- Known for: advocate for accessibility in New York

Edith Prentiss (February 1, 1952 – March 16, 2021) was an American disability rights activist.

Prentiss fought for accessibility in New York City's bus and subway systems, as well as police stations, restaurants, and public parks.

== Early life and education ==
Prentiss was born in Central Islip, New York. She was one of six children of Robert Prentiss, an electrician, and Patricia Greenwood Prentiss, a social worker.

She graduated with a degree in sociology from Stony Brook University. She attended the College of Arts and Science at Miami University in Ohio.

== Career ==
One of her early jobs was as an outreach caseworker for ARC XVI, a senior services center in Fort Washington.

She appears in the documentary film The Biggest Obstacle, which follows disability rights activist Jessica Murray.

== Activism ==
Prentiss was a member of the community board for Washington Heights, Manhattan. She was also a founding member of the Advisory Committee for Transit Accessibility (ACTA), a volunteer group of community members set up to work with the New York City Transit Authority on a range of accessibility issues.

In 2004, Prentiss drew attention to the paucity of wheelchair-accessible taxis in New York. (At the time, there were currently three in use, and she described her chances of catching one as "like a unicorn".) The number subsequently increased to 231, and after a class action in which Prentiss was a plaintiff, the New York City Taxi and Limousine Commission undertook to make the city's fleet 50% accessible by 2020. This deadline was missed with the COVID-19 pandemic said to be the reason.

== Disability ==
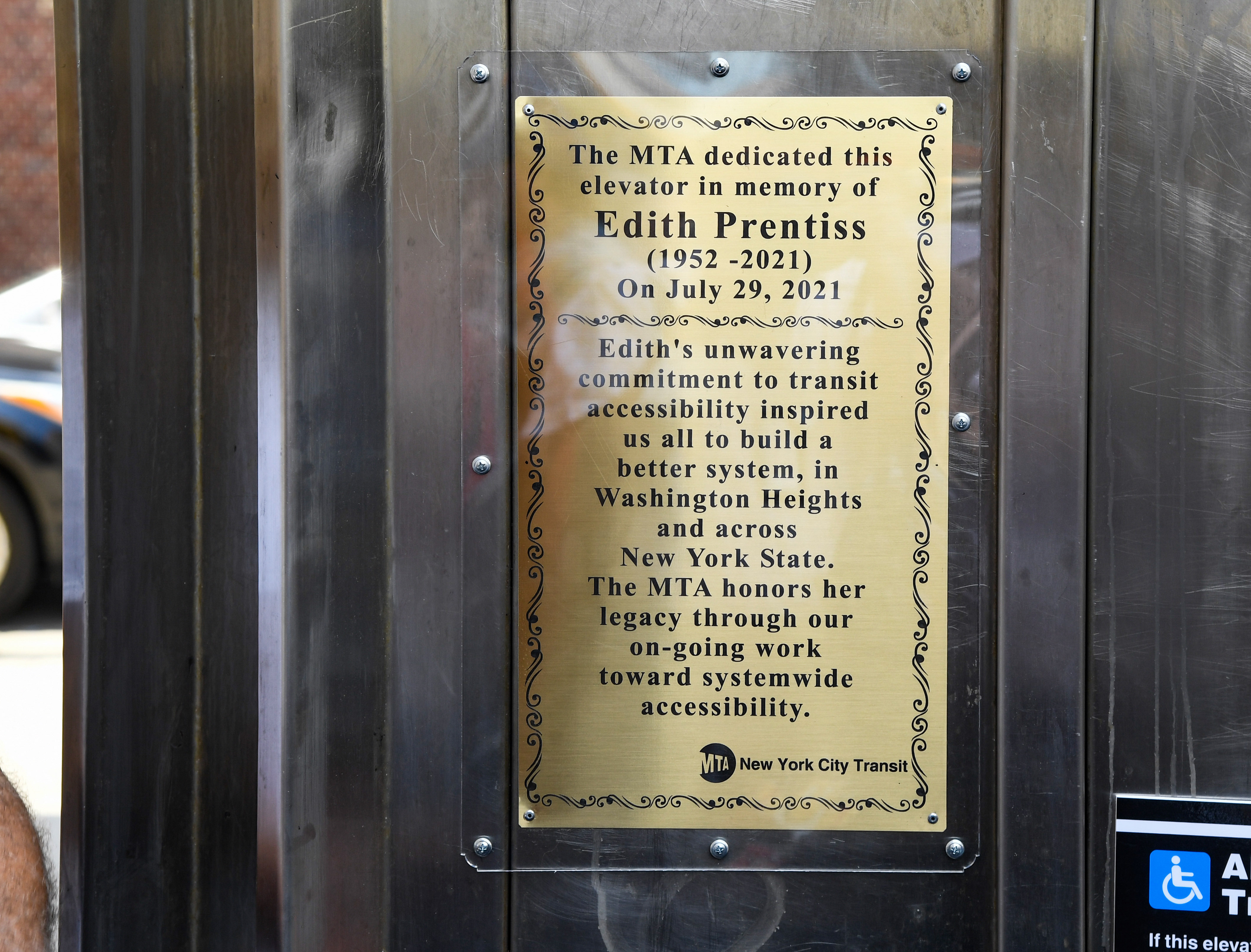
The MTA honors Edith Prentiss at 175 St Station in 2021

Prentiss had asthma, and in later life became diabetic. She started using a wheelchair in her late 40s as her asthma became severe.

== Awards and honors ==
In May 2021, she was inducted into the New York State Disability Rights Hall of Fame.

On July 22, 2021, the MTA honored Prentiss with a plaque on the 175th Street station elevator - her home station.

The filmmaker Arlene Schulman studied Prentiss for the last three years of her life. Schulman planned to create a documentary with the title Edith Prentiss: Hell on Wheels which Prentiss objected to as she thought it was too mild.
