= Central IND Substation =

Building in Manhattan, New York

- U.S. National Register of Historic Places
- New York State Register of Historic Places
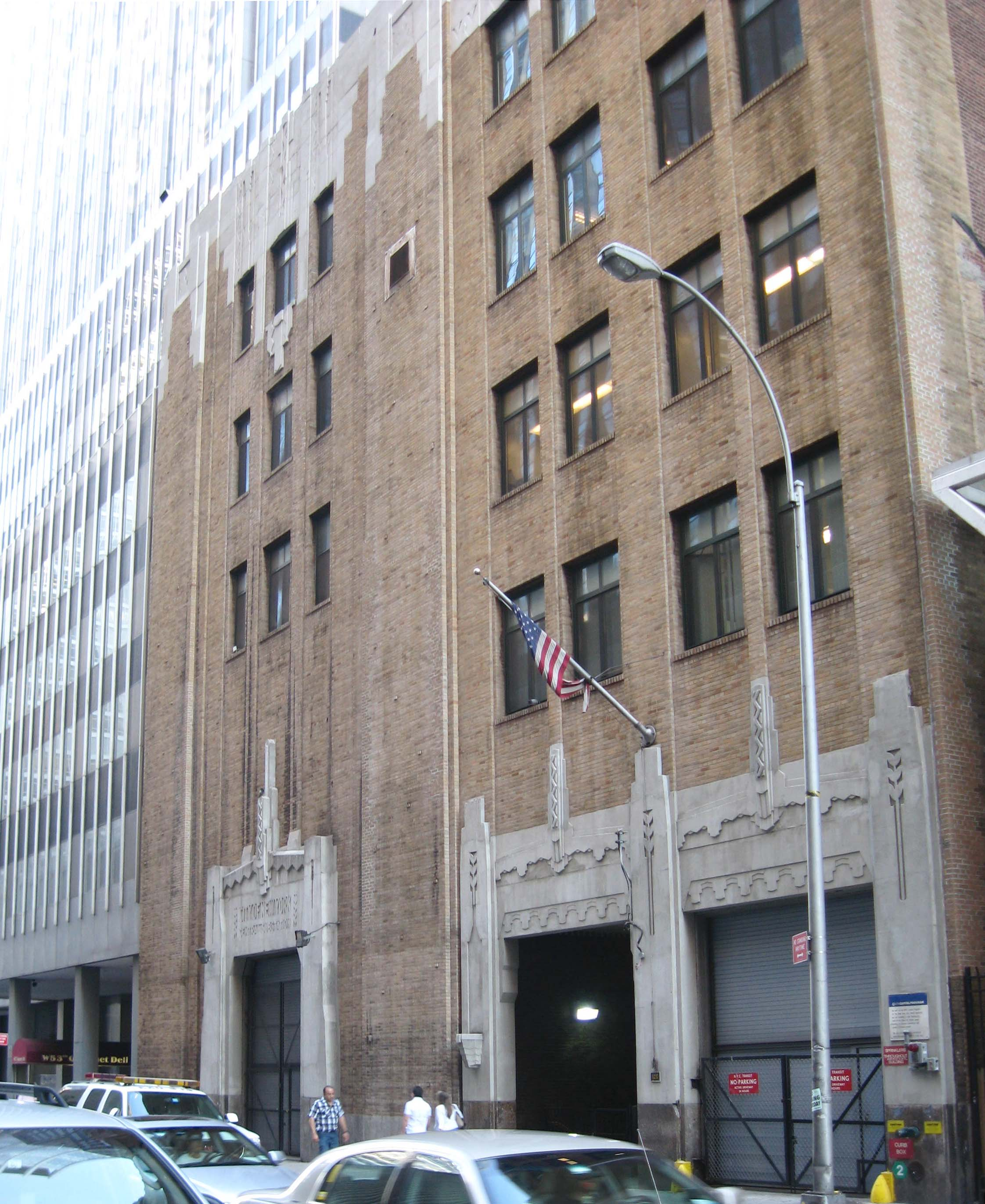

- Location within Manhattan Location within New York City Location within New York Location within the United States
- Location: 136 W. 53rd St., Manhattan, New York, US
- Coordinates: 40°45′44″N 73°58′52″W
- Area: less than one acre
- Built: 1932
- Architect: Squire J. Vickers
- Architectural style: Art Deco
- MPS: New York City Subway System MPS
- NRHP reference No.: 06000019
- NYSRHP No.: 06101.007429

Significant dates
- Added to NRHP: February 9, 2006
- Designated NYSRHP: September 19, 2005

The Central IND Substation is a substation at 126 West 53rd Street in the Midtown Manhattan neighborhood of New York City, United States. Designed by Squire J. Vickers in the Art Deco style, it was built in 1932 for the Independent Subway System (IND), now part of the New York City Subway. The building is five stories high and made of buff-colored brick above a granite base. It is on the National Register of Historic Places.

== Description ==
The Central IND Substation is located at 126 West 53rd Street in Midtown Manhattan, New York City, United States. It occupies a site measuring about 100 by 50 feet (30 by 15 m) across, on the south side of the street, in the middle of the block between Seventh Avenue and Sixth Avenue. It was originally built to provide power to the Independent Subway System (IND), one of the three major operators of the New York City Subway before the system was unified in 1940. The building was designed in the Art Deco style by Squire J. Vickers. It measures five stories high.

The building is made of buff-colored brick above a 3-foot-high (0.91 m) granite base. The brickwork is composed of overlaid vertical piers. The ground story has a large limestone entrance portal containing geometric aluminum doors; the portal itself is decorated with geometric Art Deco motifs and is topped by an inscribed nameplate and a tall projecting limestone finial. To the west (right) of the main entrance are two additional portals: a subway entrance to the left, and a garage door to the right. There are sash windows on the upper stories, which are set between the piers. The facade is topped by ornamental limestone decorations. The building's side elevations are largely windowless except for the light courts, and the rear elevation has plain sash windows on the third through fifth stories.

At ground level, there is a large, windowless space with a concrete floor, brick walls, and a concrete ceiling. This space accommodated heavy electrical equipment, including the original rotary converters, in addition to steel girders that hold up an overhead electric crane. There were originally four converters, which converted 13.2 kV, 60-cycle alternating current electricity into the 600 V direct current power used by the subway system. There is a penthouse near the top of the building, which has intake and exhaust ducts for the building's ventilation system. There is also a fourth-floor space with vinyl floors, gypsum board walls, and acoustic tile ceilings, which housed the subway system's operations office. A spiral staircase descends to the basement, which has feeder breaker panels.

== History ==
The substation is located near the Seventh Avenue station, designed as an interchange point between the IND's Queens Boulevard and Sixth Avenue lines. Work on the Queens Boulevard Line started in April 1927. As part of the IND system's construction, the city government acquired ten parcels of land in 1929 for electrical substations, including land on 53rd Street in Manhattan. The Central IND Substation itself was completed in 1932 and, as built, incorporated a never-opened exit from the Seventh Avenue station. Queens Boulevard service at the station began in 1933, and Sixth Avenue service began in 1940.

By 1976, the New York City Transit Authority (NYCTA) had proposed replacing the Central IND Substation with three newer plants, claiming that the substation was inadequate. New York state assemblyman Andrew Stein opposed the plan, claiming it would cost $16.4 million. In an 1985 study, the New York City Department of City Planning recommended opening the substation's unopened subway entrance to reduce crowding at Fifth Avenue/53rd Street station. The building housed four converters until 1993, when they were replaced with new rectifiers. The NYCTA System Operations offices moved out in 1994, but the NYCTA Track Structures office remained int he building. The building was added to the National Register of Historic Places in 2005.

== See also ==
- Art Deco architecture of New York City
- National Register of Historic Places listings in Manhattan from 14th to 59th Streets

== Sources ==
- National Register of Historic Places Inventory/Nomination: Central IND Substation (PDF) (Report). National Park Service. 2006.
