= Robert Ridgway (engineer) =

American civil engineer (1862–1938)

- Born: October 19, 1862; Brooklyn, New York, U.S.
- Died: December 19, 1938 (aged 76); Fort Wayne, Indiana, U.S.
- Resting place: Kensico Cemetery
- Spouses: Lillie A. Littell (m. 1888; died 1927); Isabel L. Law (m. 1928)
- Engineering career
- Employers: Northern Pacific Railway (1882–1884); New York Aqueduct Commission (1884–1900); Rapid Transit Commission (1900–1905); New York Board of Water Supply (1905–1912); New York State Public Service Commission (1912–1921); New York State Transit Commission (1921–1924); New York City Board of Transportation (1924–1932)
- Awards: Order of the Rising Sun

Robert Ridgway (October 19, 1862 – December 19, 1938) was an American civil engineer who spent nearly 50 years working for the public sector on the construction of major subway and water supply projects serving New York City. Except for four years of primary school, he did not receive any formal education, and mainly learned through self-study and on-the-job training as part of surveying crews for railway lines and an aqueduct. Ridgway rose to the level of chief engineer of New York's Transit Commission in 1921 and was considered to be the leading builder of subways in the United States by 1933, when he retired from active work. He was elected as president of the American Society of Civil Engineers in 1925.

== Early life ==
Robert Ridgway was born in Brooklyn, New York on October 19, 1862 to Joseph Skidmore Ridgway, a lawyer, and Margaret Ridgway (née Stephens). Robert was the second youngest of seven children in the family and had five brothers and one sister.

In 1870, he began attending public school in Brooklyn, but Ridgway's formal education ended four years later when his family moved to a farm in Greenbrook, New Jersey and he had to resort to learning at home using his older brother's textbooks. He was an avid reader and also was interested in music, singing in the church choir. In 1880, his family moved near Cranford, New Jersey, where Ridgway befriended Reverend Walter Coe Roberts, the rector of Trinity Episcopal Church. Roberts was a graduate of Sheffield Scientific School, where he had received training in architecture, and he taught Ridgway about geometry and trigonometry as well as providing a reading program to advance his studies.

== Career ==
Ridgway did not want to become a lawyer like his father and some of his brothers. (Note: Robert's brother James W. Ridgway served four terms as Brooklyn District Attorney, his brother Charles W. Ridgway spent about 12 years as assistant corporation counsel of New York City, and his brother Leonard M. Ridgway was a counselor-at-law.) He was interested in the field of engineering and when he heard about the expansion of the Northern Pacific Railway to the west from Bismarck, North Dakota, he aspired to work on the project and began studying elementary surveying under the guidance of Roberts. Ridgway left home in 1882 and traveled to Saint Paul, Minnesota, where he presented a letter of introduction to Herman Haupt, general manager of the Northern Pacific Railway. (Note: In his autobiography, Ridgway noted that his father wrote a letter to his friend Sidney DeKay (the son of Commodore DeKay), who provided the letter of introduction to Haupt. Sidney DeKay served as a colonel during the American Civil War, was admitted to the bar in 1869, and married the daughter of civil engineer Alfred W. Craven in 1870.) He began working as a chainman, rodman and instrument man in a surveying party to locate a railroad line from Billings to Fort Benton in Montana Territory and to improve a survey for a railroad line between Superior and Ashland in Wisconsin.

In 1884, Ridgway returned to the New York City area and began working for the New York Aqueduct Commission as an instrument man, and later as an assistant engineer, on the New Croton Aqueduct project in Westchester County. After the aqueduct was placed into service in 1890, he spent five years working on the construction of the Titicus Reservoir in Westchester, which was followed by five years of work on construction of the Jerome Park Reservoir in the Bronx.

Ridgway worked as an assistant engineer for the Rapid Transit Commission from 1900 to 1905, where he was involved with the construction of the first Interborough Rapid Transit (IRT) subway in Manhattan, serving as the principal assistant to Alfred Craven for the Second Division—the portion of the line from 41st Street and Park Avenue to 104th Street and Broadway. He later directed construction of the South Ferry Loop under Battery Park, the Joralemon Street Tunnel (the first underwater subway tunnel connecting Manhattan and Brooklyn), and the extension of the subway into Brooklyn. (Note: Alfred Craven (1846–1926) was the son of Rear Admiral Thomas Tingey Craven.)

In 1905, he was offered the position of a division head on the Catskill Aqueduct project by J. Waldo Smith of the newly-formed New York Board of Water Supply. Ridgway supervised construction of the northern 60 miles (97 km) of the aqueduct from the Ashokan Reservoir in Ulster County to a location near Peekskill in Westchester, including the rock pressure tunnel located 1,100 feet (340 m) below the Hudson River. (Note: Ridgway was placed in charge of the Northern Aqueduct Department, which included the section of the Catskill Aqueduct that crossed under the Hudson River.)

Ridgway returned to working on the New York City subway system in 1912, after Craven offered him the position of engineer of subway construction for the First District of the New York State Public Service Commission, where he became involved with expansions to the IRT and the Brooklyn–Manhattan Transit Corporation (BMT) systems under the Dual Contracts. He later became the chief engineer of the New York State Transit Commission in 1921 and the chief engineer of the New York City Board of Transportation in 1924, when the Transit Commission's control of the planning and construction of new subway lines was transferred to the new agency, resulting in the Independent Subway System. (Note: The Transit Commission took over control of New York City's transit lines from the Public Service Commission in 1921.) Ridgway resigned from his position as chief engineer in 1932 and planned to retire, but continued serving the Board of Transportation as a consulting engineer for one more year after the unexpected death of John R. Slattery, who was planned to become his successor. Upon Ridgway's retirement from active work in 1933, the Brooklyn Eagle wrote that "he is widely recognized as the foremost subway builder in the country" and the Brooklyn Times-Union noted that "he had a part in the construction of every foot of the rapid transit systems of New York". (Note: A number of subway infrastructure projects Ridgway was involved with are listed on the National Register of Historic Places, with several listed in relation to one multiple property study, the "New York City Subway System MPS". Works he is credited with include: 15th Street–Prospect Park subway station; 181st Street subway station; 190th Street subway station; 207th Street Yard Signal Service Building and Tower B; Concourse Yard Entry Buildings and Substation; Coney Island Yard Gatehouse; Flushing – Main Street subway station; West Fourth Street–Washington Square subway station; and Wilson Avenue subway station.) (Note: Following his death, Ridgway was credited with the "discovery" of civil engineer Clifford Holland, who began working under Ridgway shortly after he graduated from Harvard University in 1906. Ridgway became one of Holland's closest personal friends and visited him at a sanatorium in Michigan in October 1927, departing the same day that Holland later died of a heart attack.)

In the latter portion of his career, Ridgway served as a consultant to projects throughout the United States. These included serving on the Chicago Traction and Subway Commission (1916), on a board to select the location and design of a bridge across San Francisco Bay (1927), on a board to study a site for a dam on the Colorado River (1928), as a consultant to the Port of New York Authority on the design of the Midtown Tunnel (1933), as an expert to review plans for a subway and rapid transit system in San Francisco (1935), and on a board of engineers to study plans for subway lines in Chicago (1938). (Note: The subway lines studied in Chicago included the Milwaukee–Dearborn subway and the State Street subway.)

In 1929, Ridgway was selected by President Herbert Hoover as a member of the United States delegation to the World Engineering Congress in Tokyo, where he provided advice on railway tunnels, including the Moji-Shimonoseki project under the Kanmon Straits. He was presented with the Third Order of the Rising Sun by the Japanese government before he returned to America aboard the Asama Maru.

During his career, Ridgway received honorary degrees from New York University (Master of Science, 1915; Civil Engineer, 1918), Harvard University (Master of Arts, 1925), Lehigh University (Doctor of Engineering, 1929), and Polytechnic Institute of Brooklyn (Doctor of Engineering, 1933).

== Professional societies ==
Ridgway was elected as a junior member of the American Society of Civil Engineers (ASCE) in 1888, a member in 1903, and an honorary member in 1934. He served the national society as a director (1911–1913), vice-president (1922–1923), and president (1925). Ridgway was also elected as the first president of the local ASCE section formed in New York City in 1920. (Note: The New York Section of ASCE was renamed as the Metropolitan Section in 1931.)

He also served as a president of the Harvard Engineering Society and the Municipal Engineers of the City of New York. Ridgway was also a member of the American Association for the Advancement of Science, the American Association of Engineers, the American Society for Municipal Improvements, the Franklin Institute, the Institution of Civil Engineers, the New England Water Works Association, and the Society of American Military Engineers.

== Personal life, death and legacy ==
Ridgway married Lillie A. Littell of Cranford, New Jersey on May 10, 1888. After the death of his first wife on March 12, 1927, he married her niece, Isabel L. Law, on September 15, 1928. The wedding was held at her family's camp at Skiff Lake in New Brunswick, Canada. The local minister from Canterbury was assisted at the ceremony by Ridgway's good friend Reverend Walter Coe Roberts, who had served as the officiant of his first wedding and the groom had known since his childhood in Cranford.

Ridgway was a member of the Arkwright Club, the Engineers' Club, and the Harvard Club of New York City.

He died on December 19, 1938, at Methodist Hospital in Fort Wayne, Indiana. Ridgway had suffered a heart attack the previous morning while he and his wife were en route to New York after attending ground-breaking ceremonies for a new subway in Chicago; Ridgway was taken off the train when it reached Fort Wayne and brought to the hospital. At the time of his death, Ridgway was 76 years old, resided at 24 Gramercy Park South, and was serving as a member of a Chicago subway commission for Harold L. Ickes. His funeral was held at the Church of the Transfiguration in Manhattan and attended by 1,200 mourners. Ridgway was buried at Kensico Cemetery in Westchester.

In 1940, his widow privately published his autobiography, which he had dictated to her following his retirement, but he had not reviewed or revised the manuscript before his death. Isabel L. Ridgway also endowed the Robert Ridgway Student Chapter Award in honor of her husband, which was approved by ASCE's Board of Direction in 1965, the year after her death.
