= Bennett Park (New York City) =

Public park in Manhattan, New York

Coordinates: 40°51′10″N 73°56′17″W

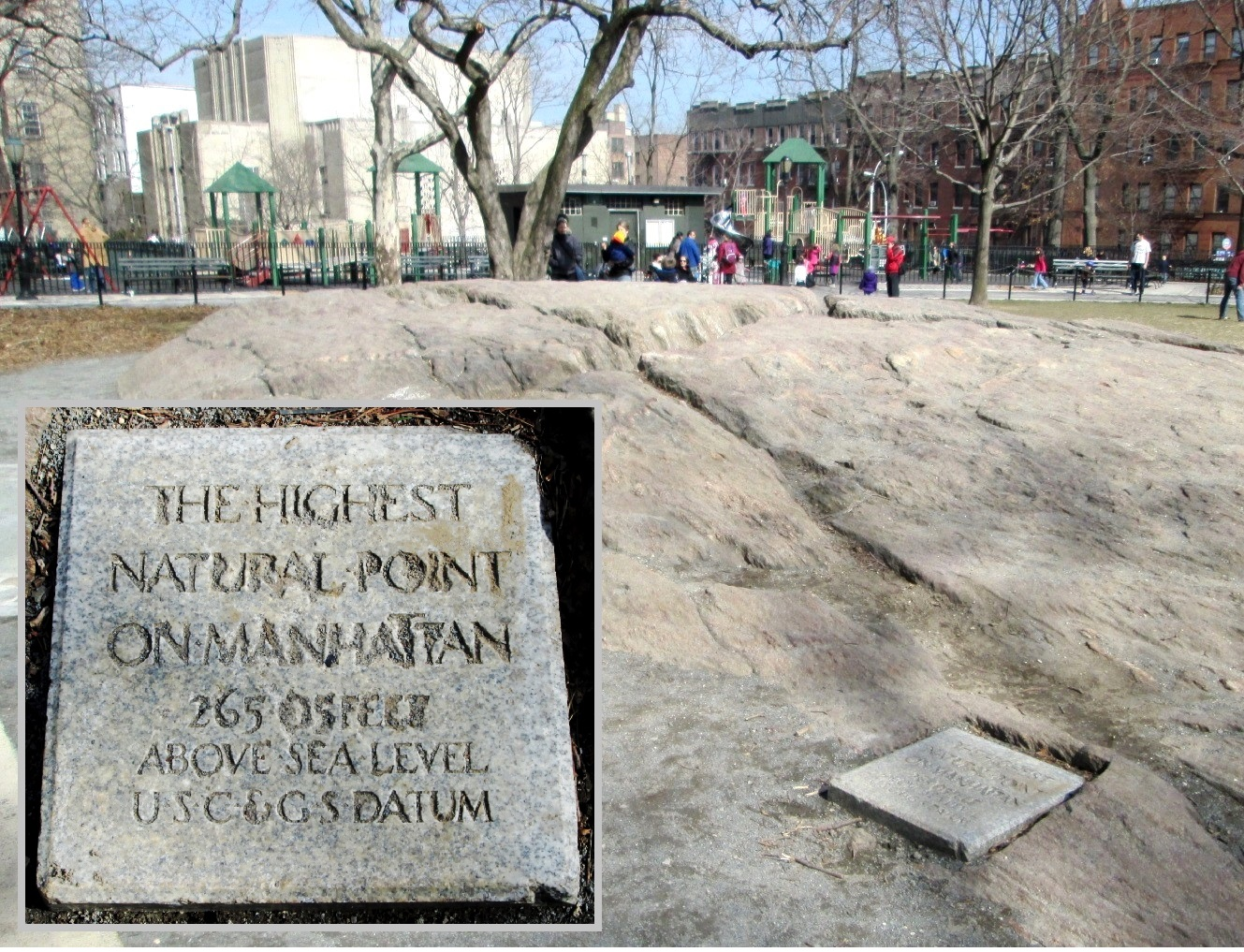
The highest natural point in Manhattan; in the inset is the stone marker seen in the lower right of the larger image.

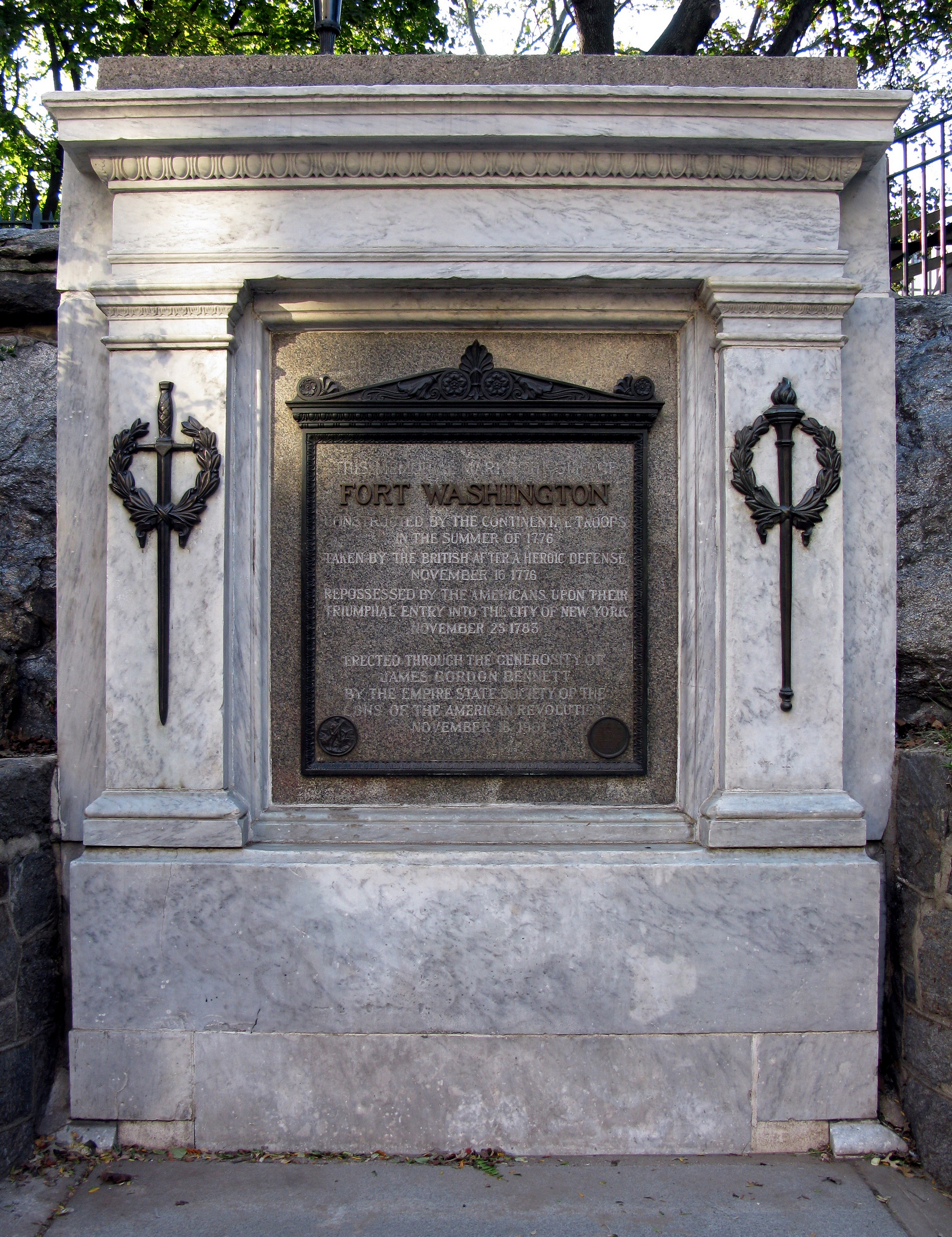
Plaque commemorating the site of Fort Washington; see the close up of the right-hand badge at the bottom of the plaque in this article's gallery of images

Bennett Park, also known as James Gordon Bennett Park, is a 1.8-acre (0.73 ha) public park in New York City, named for James Gordon Bennett, Sr., the newspaper publisher who launched the New York Herald in 1835. It is located between Pinehurst and Fort Washington Avenues and West 183rd and 185th Streets in the Hudson Heights neighborhood of Washington Heights in northern Manhattan, on land purchased by Bennett in 1871, the year before his death. It sits opposite the northern Fort Washington Avenue entrance to the 181st Street subway station on the IND Eighth Avenue Line, serviced by the A train. The park contains the highest natural elevation in Manhattan, at 265.05 feet above sea level.

Bennett, Sr. passed ownership of the land – which included the site of Fort Washington, from which the Continental Army delayed the advance of British troops in 1776 – to his son, James Gordon Bennett, Jr., who in 1901 allowed the Sons of the American Revolution to erect a marble, bronze and granite stele designed by Charles R. Lamb to commemorate the battle. This was dedicated in 1901 and is now located on the eastern perimeter wall of the park.

Bennett intended to donate the land to the city for use as a park but died in 1918 without adding that bequest to his will. The land was therefore divided for sale, but the request of the American Scenic and Historic Preservation Society that the part of the property where Fort Washington stood be preserved was honored. In 1928, the site was acquired by the city, and, with additional land, was turned over to the Parks Department. The park opened in 1929.

In 1932, in commemoration of the bicentennial of the birth of George Washington, the Washington Heights Honor Grove Association planted an American elm tree, which is indicated with a marker. Other memorials in the park include the Emilio Barbosa Memorial, given in 1996 by Joseph Barbosa to honor his younger brother, who died on the USS Nevada at Okinawa in 1945.

On the west side of the park lies an outcropping of Manhattan schist, which is the highest natural point in Manhattan – 265 feet (81 m) above sea level – with a square stone marker attesting to the fact. The schist is part of the bedrock foundation of New York City, which allows the construction of skyscrapers where it lies close to the surface.

The park's playground was constructed in the 1940s, and service buildings were added in 1964.

As part of the "Northern Manhattan Parks 2030 Master Plan", devised in 2010–11, the playground and comfort station in Bennett Park will be reconfigured to "improve sight-lines and play value." In addition, the condition of the park's perimeter will be improved.

== Gallery ==
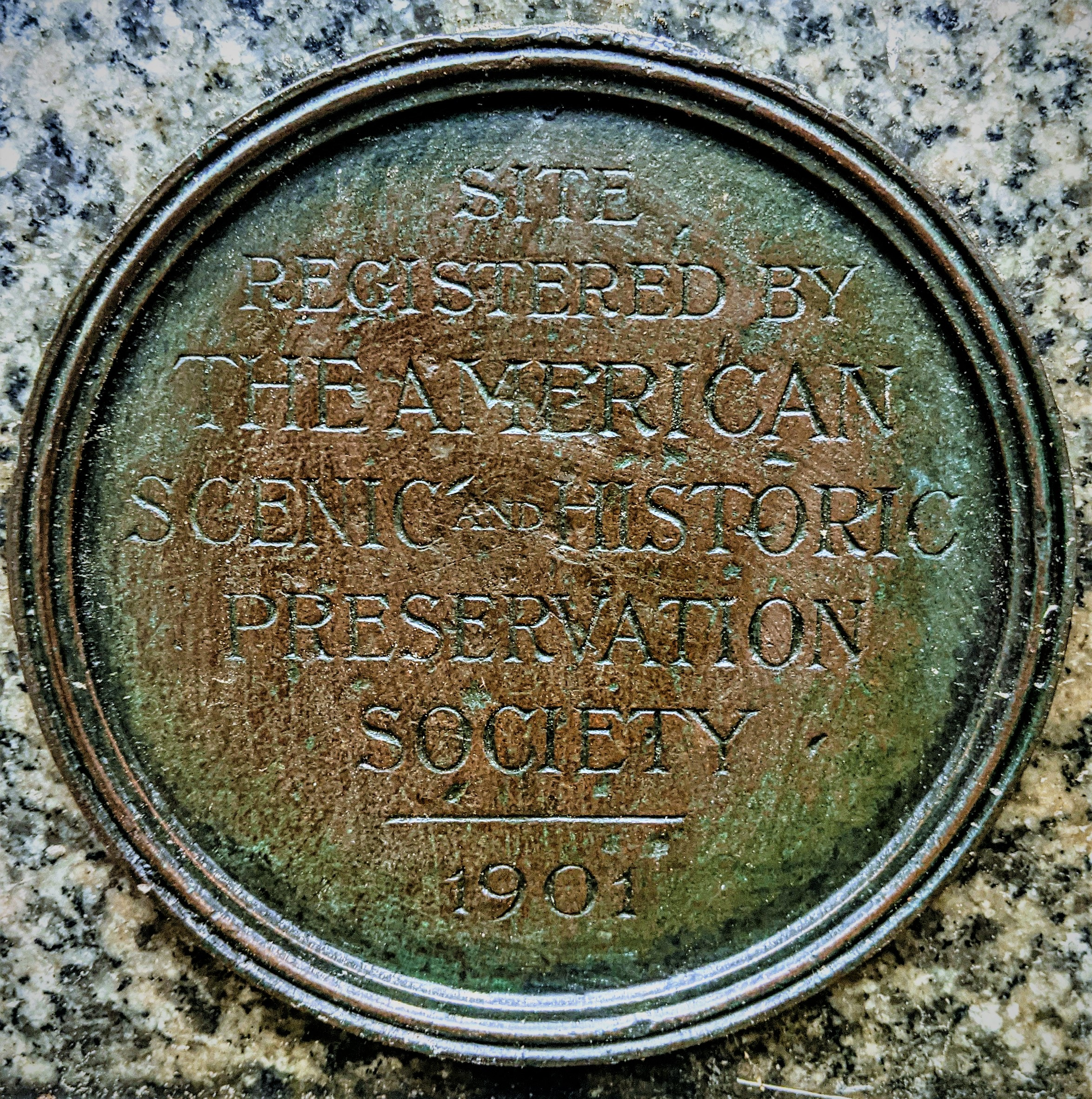
Badge on front of the Fort Washington stele

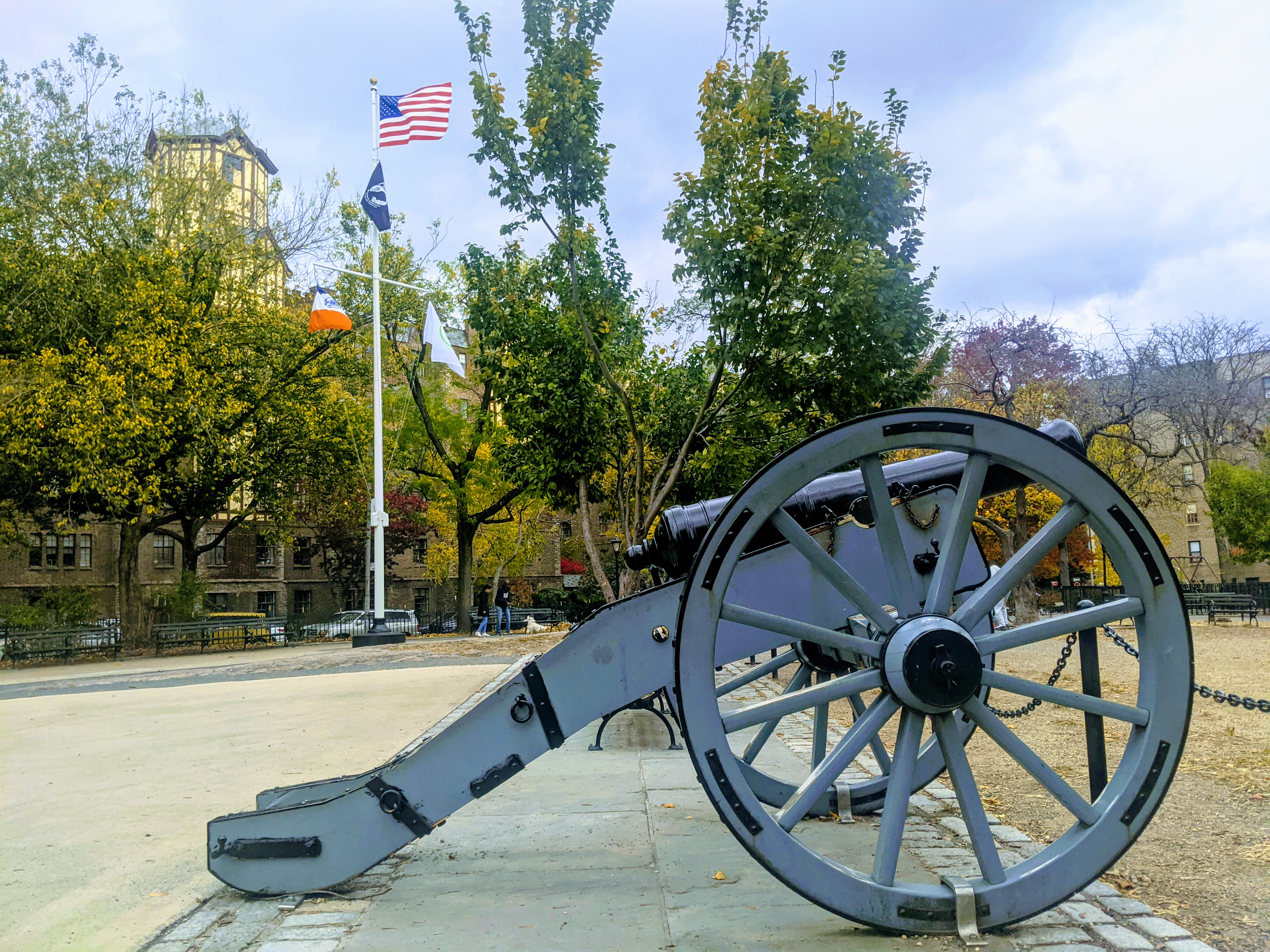
Cannon, part of the Fort Washington memorials

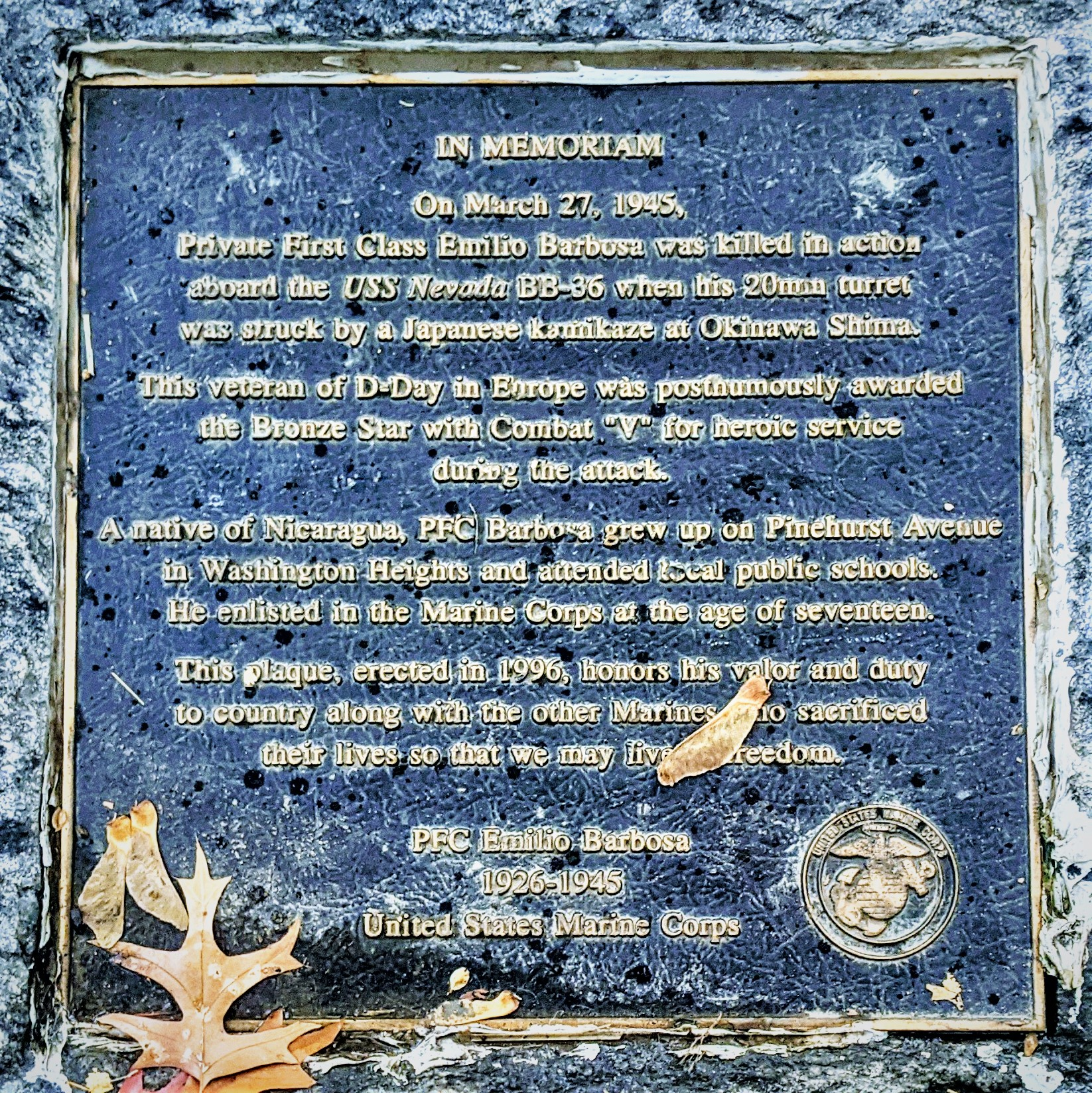
Barbosa WWII memorial
