= Fort Washington Avenue =

Avenue in Manhattan, New York

Coordinates: 40°50′53.77″N 73°56′21.66″W

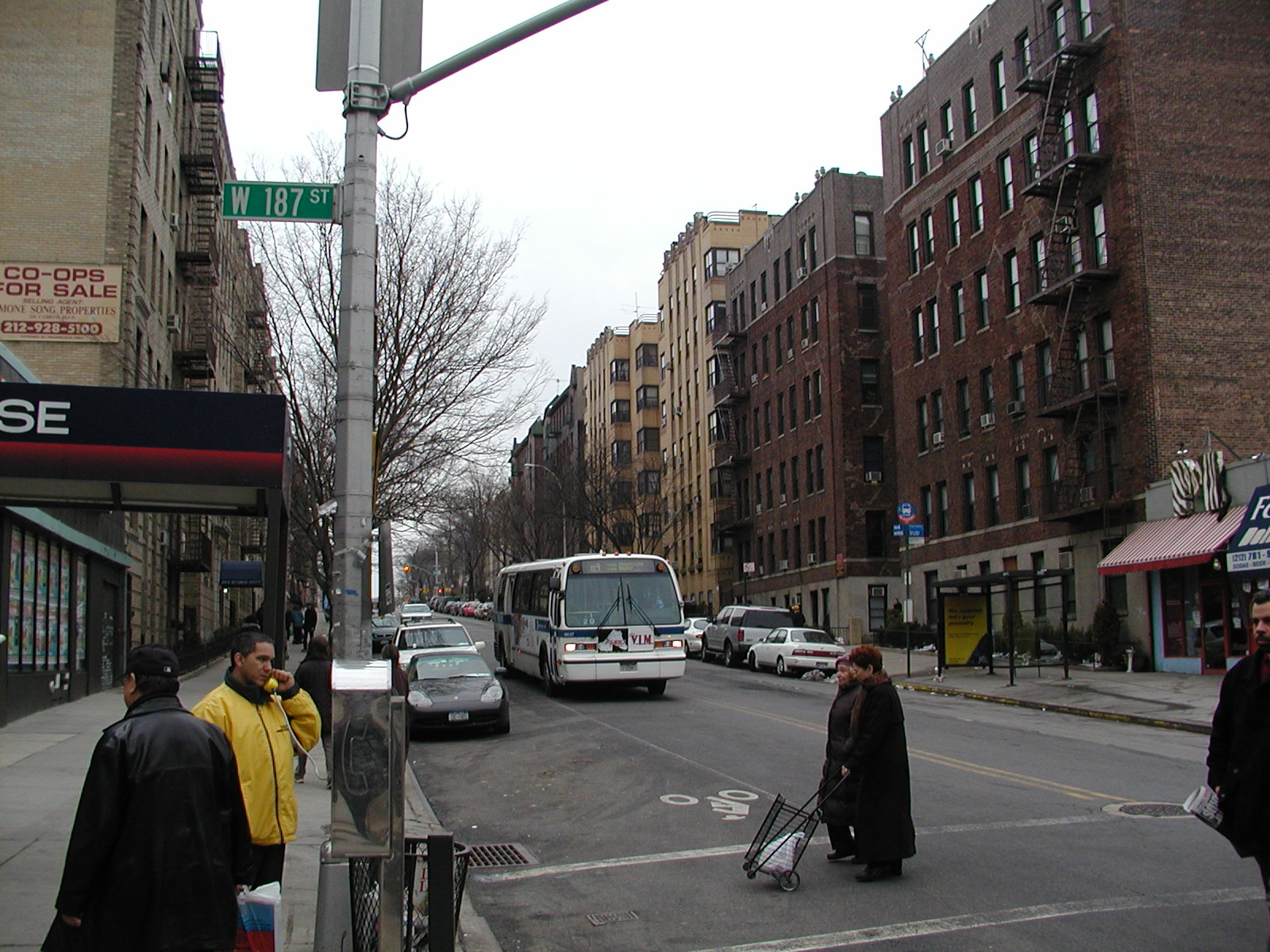
Fort Washington Avenue south of 187th Street in the Hudson Heights section of Washington Heights

Fort Washington Avenue is a major north-south street in the Washington Heights neighborhood of Manhattan. It runs from Fort Tryon Park to 159th Street, where it intersects with Broadway. It goes past Bennett Park, the highest natural point in Manhattan. Famous residents of Fort Washington Avenue include Drs. Henry Kissinger and Ruth Westheimer, TV's "Doctor Ruth".

== Transportation connections ==
The IND Eighth Avenue Line of the New York City Subway (A train) runs underneath Fort Washington Avenue, stopping at the 175th Street, 181st Street, and 190th Street stations.

The avenue is served in its entirety by the downtown M4, with uptown service beginning at West 165th Street. Limited-stop service is provided by the M98 north of West 179th Street uptown, or West 178th Street downtown. The Bx3, Bx11, Bx35 and Bx36 all use Fort Washington between both aforementioned streets downtown to loop around and change direction, with the first half making its first stop at Broadway/West 179th Street, and the second half at West 178th Street/Fort Washington Avenue.
