= 175th Street station (IND Eighth Avenue Line) =

New York City Subway station in Manhattan

175 Street
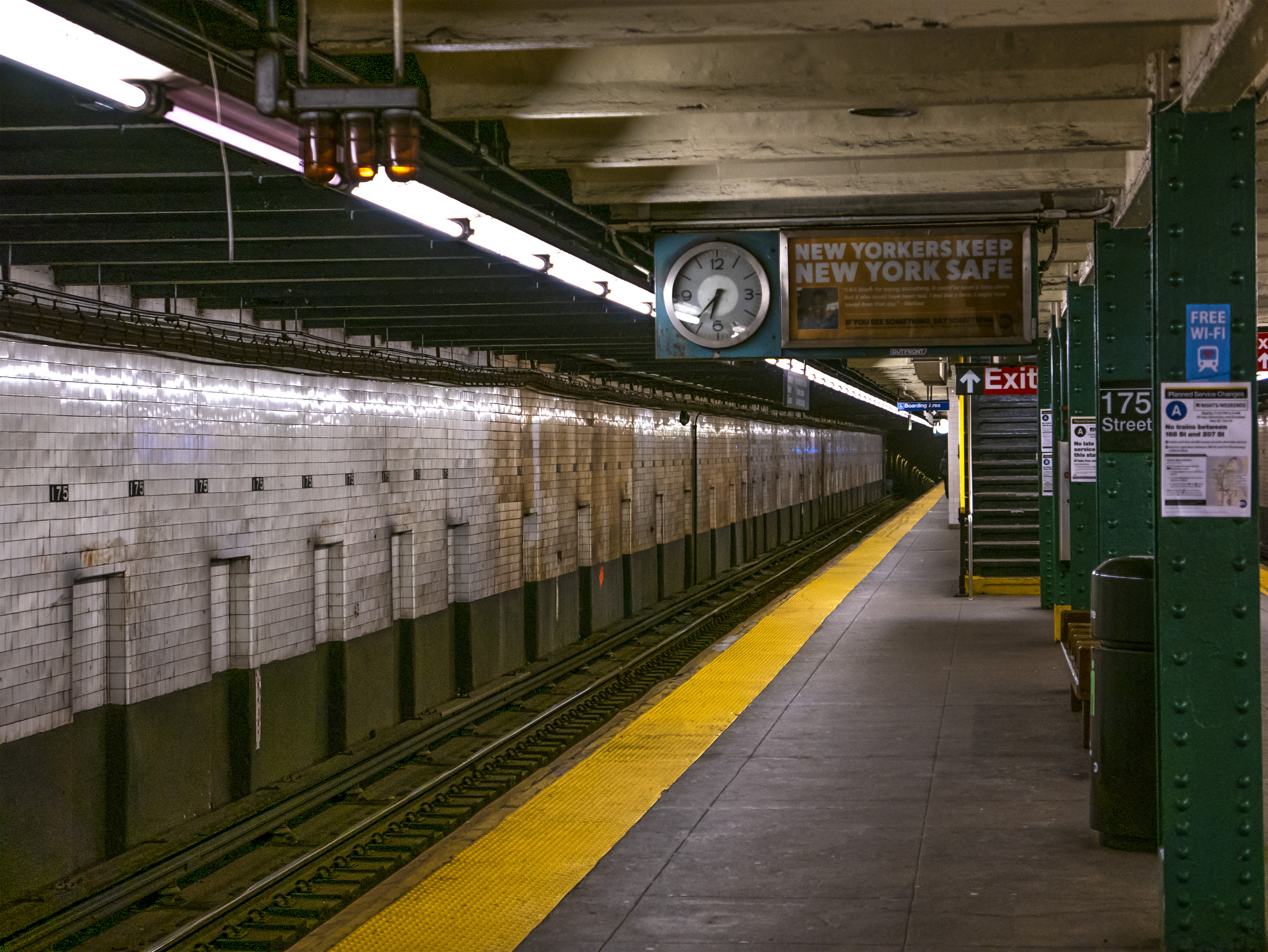
- Platform view, southbound track

Station statistics
- Address: West 175th Street & Fort Washington Avenue; New York, New York
- Borough: Manhattan
- Locale: Washington Heights
- Coordinates: 40.846541°N 73.940091°W
- Division: B (IND)
- Line: IND Eighth Avenue Line
- Services: A (all times)
- Transit: NYCT Bus: M4, M5, M98, M100, Bx3, Bx7, Bx11, Bx13, Bx35, Bx36; GWB Bus Station
- Structure: Underground
- Platforms: 1 island platform
- Tracks: 2

Other information
- Opened: September 10, 1932 (94 years ago)
- Accessible: Yes (Underground passage to GWB Bus Station has stairs only, no ramp)
- Former/other names: 175th Street–George Washington Bridge Bus Terminal

Traffic
- 2025: 2,324,751 ▲1.8%
- Rank: 157 out of 423
Services
Preceding station	New York City Subway	Following station
181st Street toward Inwood–207th Street	A (New York City Subway service)	168th Street toward Far Rockaway–Mott Avenue or Ozone Park–Lefferts Boulevard
Location
Location within New York City Subway
Location within New York City
Location within New York
Track layout
Street map
Station service legend
Symbol	Description
Stops all times	Stops all times

The 175th Street station (also known as 175th Street–George Washington Bridge Bus Terminal) is a station on the IND Eighth Avenue Line of the New York City Subway. Located in the Washington Heights neighborhood in Upper Manhattan, at the intersection of 175th Street and Fort Washington Avenue, it is served by the A train at all times.

== History ==
New York City mayor John Francis Hylan's original plans for the Independent Subway System (IND), proposed in 1922, included building over 100 miles (160 km) of new lines and taking over nearly 100 miles (160 km) of existing lines. The lines were designed to compete with the existing underground, surface, and elevated lines operated by the Interborough Rapid Transit Company (IRT) and BMT. On December 9, 1924, the New York City Board of Transportation (BOT) gave preliminary approval for the construction of the IND Eighth Avenue Line. This line consisted of a corridor connecting Inwood, Manhattan, to Downtown Brooklyn, running largely under Eighth Avenue but also paralleling Greenwich Avenue and Sixth Avenue in Lower Manhattan. The BOT announced a list of stations on the new line in February 1928, with a station at 175th Street.

The finishes at the five stations between 175th and 207th Street were 18 percent completed by May 1930. By that August, the BOT reported that the Eighth Avenue Line was nearly completed and that the stations from 116th to 207th Street were 99.9 percent completed. The entire line was completed by September 1931, except for the installation of turnstiles. A preview event for the new subway was hosted on September 8, 1932, two days before the official opening. The 175th Street station opened on September 10, 1932, as part of the city-operated IND's initial segment, the Eighth Avenue Line between Chambers Street and 207th Street.

The tiles on the station's walls were repaired in 1937. In 1952, as part of an early plan for the George Washington Bridge Bus Station, officials proposed building an underpass between the 175th Street station and the planned bus terminal. The elevators at the station were installed in November 1989, making the station one of the earliest to comply with the Americans with Disabilities Act of 1990.

The station was planned to be rehabilitated as part of the 2015–2019 MTA Capital Program. Both elevators were closed for replacement, as of December 2023, and were scheduled to reopen in June 2024. Both elevators reopened as of late February 2025, eight months behind schedule.

== Station layout ==
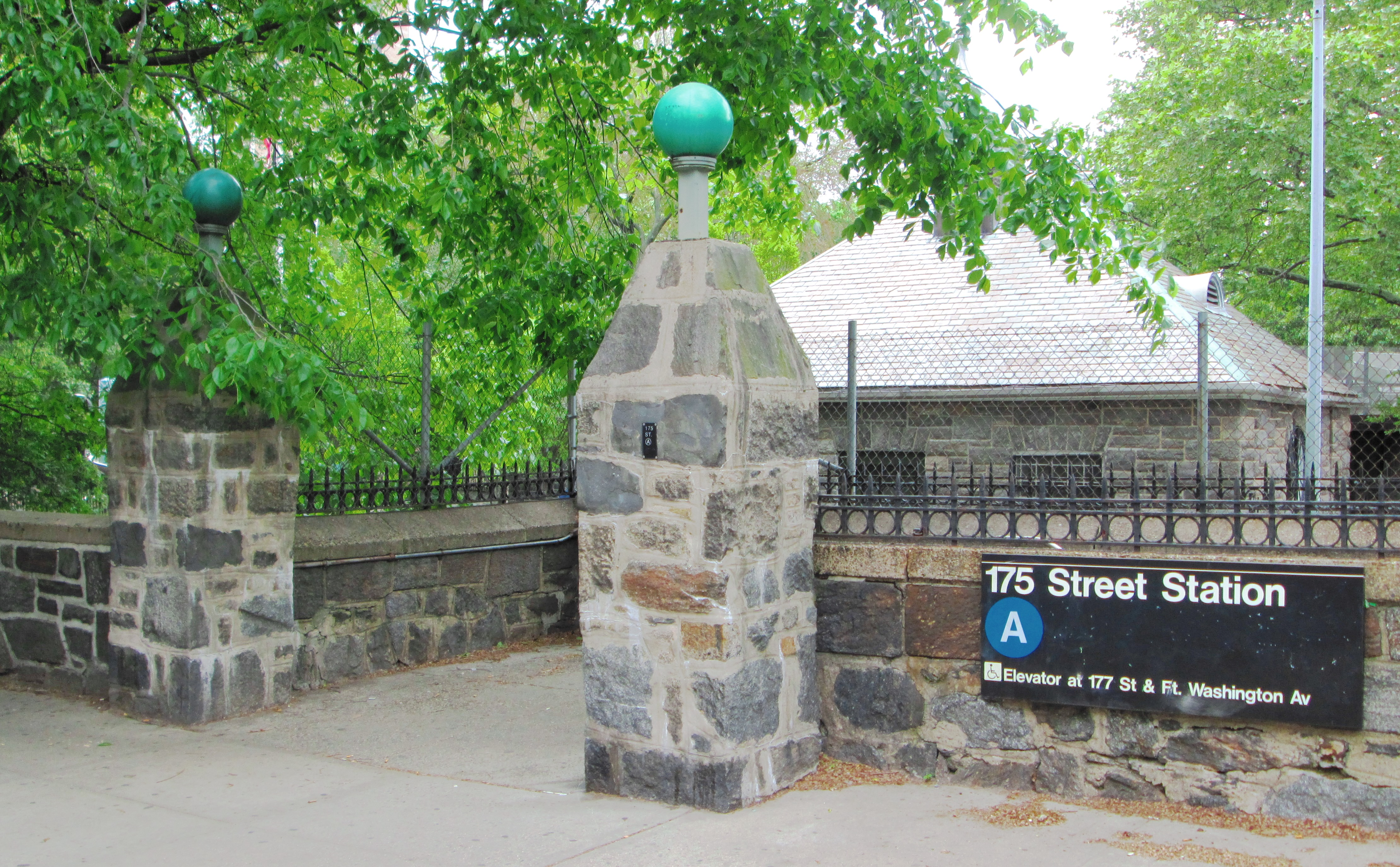
Stone entrance on Fort Washington Avenue at 175th Street

The underground station has two tracks and one island platform, with single green columns in the center of the platform rather than the double columns found near the platform edges at other stations. The tilework in this station is plain, and lacks the maroon-colored tile bands that are present at adjacent stations along the line. The station is served by the A train at all times; the next station northbound is 181st Street while the next station southbound is 168th Street.

It is linked by a tunnel to the George Washington Bridge Bus Station. The tunnel, which is maintained by the Port Authority of New York and New Jersey, is not wheelchair-accessible, as using it requires traversing a short flight of stairs between the tunnel and the station mezzanine. This tunnel is closed at night between 1 a.m. and 5 a.m.

The 174th Street Yard, used to store trains assigned to the C service, is adjacent to this station to the east.

=== Exits ===
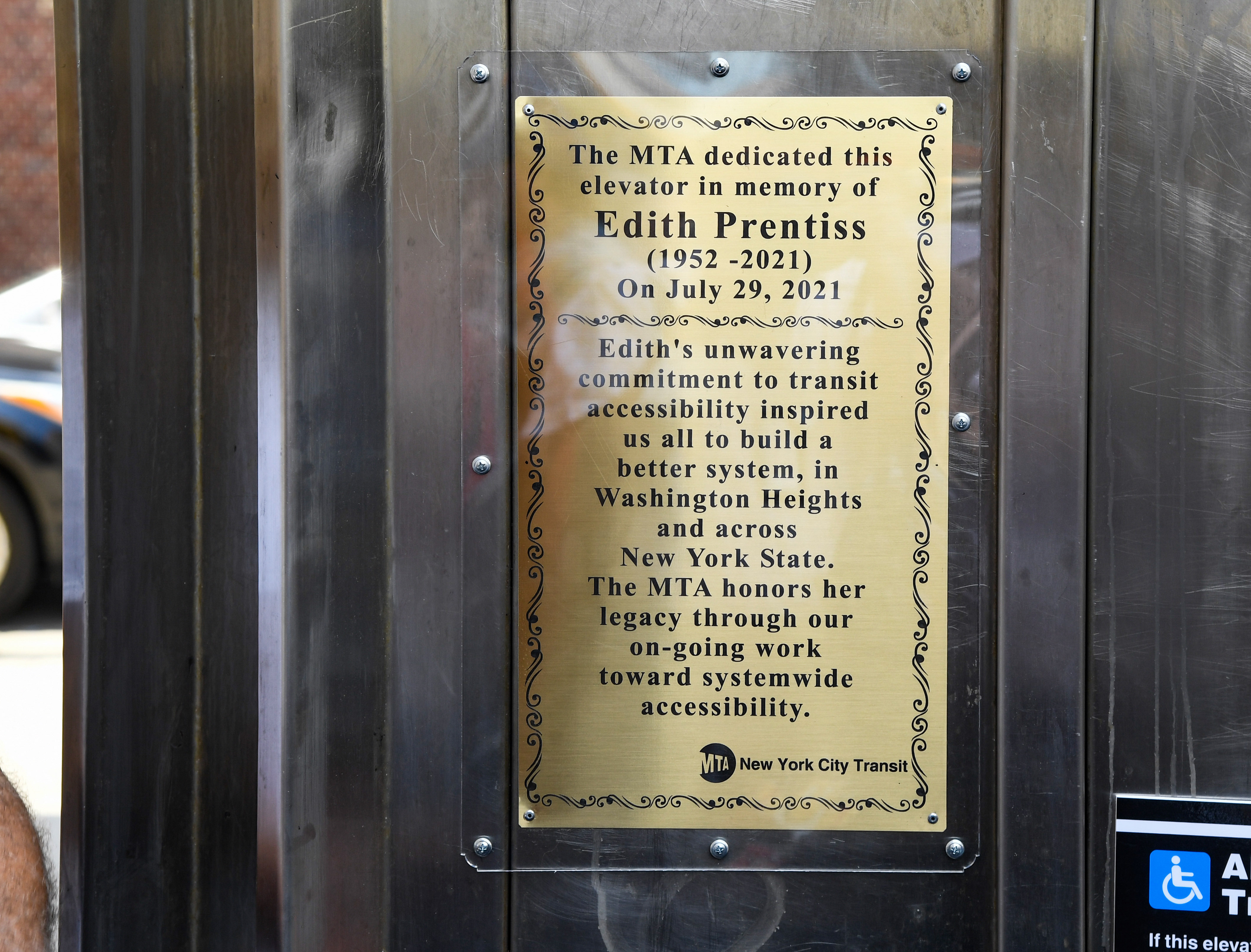
A plaque unveiled in 2021 thanking Edith Prentiss for inspiring improvements in ADA accessibility

The full-time exits are at 175th Street and 177th Street. The station is fully accessible, with an elevator at the northeast corner of 177th Street, and another from the mezzanine to the platform. The 177th Street exit offers a direct passageway into the basement of the George Washington Bridge Bus Station, but it includes stairs.

The ADA-accessible exits at the northwest, northeast, and southwest corners of Fort Washington Avenue and 177th Street. The northwest corner has two stairs, the southwest corner has one stair, and the northeast corner has one stair and one elevator. There are also exits at the southwest and southeast corners of Fort Washington Avenue and 175th Street.

There is also a closed exit at the south end of the station that leads to the southeast corner of 174th Street and Fort Washington Avenue via a passageway. The passageway was not monitored and was closed to improve security. In June 1994, the MTA Board approved a plan to permanently close the entrance, allowing the passageway to be sealed with brick-and-mortar with the street staircase slabbed over. At this point, the entrance had been closed for several years. A public meeting was held in May 1994, along with proposed station access changes at other stations.

== Bus service ==
The station and the nearby George Washington Bridge Bus Station are served by ten local MTA Regional Bus Operations routes and various interstate bus routes.

Route	Operator	North/West Terminal	South/East Terminal	via	notes
Local Bus Routes
M4	New York City Bus	The Cloisters or Fort Tryon Park	Fifth Avenue/32nd Street, Koreatown	Broadway and Fifth Avenue	Bus only runs to the Cloisters when the museum is open; it only runs to Fort Tryon Park at all other times.
M5	New York City Bus	Broadway at West 179th Street	Broadway/31st Street, Garment District	Riverside Drive, Fifth Avenue, and Broadway	
M98 LTD	New York City Bus	Fort Tryon Park	68th Street/Lexington Avenue	Harlem River Drive and Lexington Avenue	Bus only runs during rush hours.
M100	New York City Bus	West 220th Street/Broadway, Inwood	West 125th Street/Amsterdam Avenue, Manhattanville	Broadway and Amsterdam Avenues	
Bx3	New York City Bus	238th Street station, Riverdale, Bronx	West 179th Street east of Broadway	University Avenue	
Bx7	New York City Bus	West 263rd Street/Riverdale Avenue, Riverdale, Bronx	168th Street station	Broadway, Johnson Avenue, Henry Hudson Parkway	
Bx11	New York City Bus	West 179th Street west of Broadway	Simpson Street station, Longwood, Bronx	170th Street	
Bx13	New York City Bus	West 179th Street west of Broadway	Bronx Terminal Market (extended to Third Avenue/163rd Street, rush hours)	Ogden Avenue and Yankee Stadium	
Bx35	New York City Bus	West 179th Street east of Broadway	Simpson Street station, Longwood, Bronx	167th/169th Streets	
Bx36	New York City Bus	West 179th Street west of Broadway	Olmstead Avenue/Seaward Avenue, Castle Hill, Bronx	174th/180th Streets	
Other bus routes
George Washington Bridge Bus Station routes	Various	George Washington Bridge Bus Station			
