= 181st Street station (IND Eighth Avenue Line) =

New York City Subway station in Manhattan

181 Street
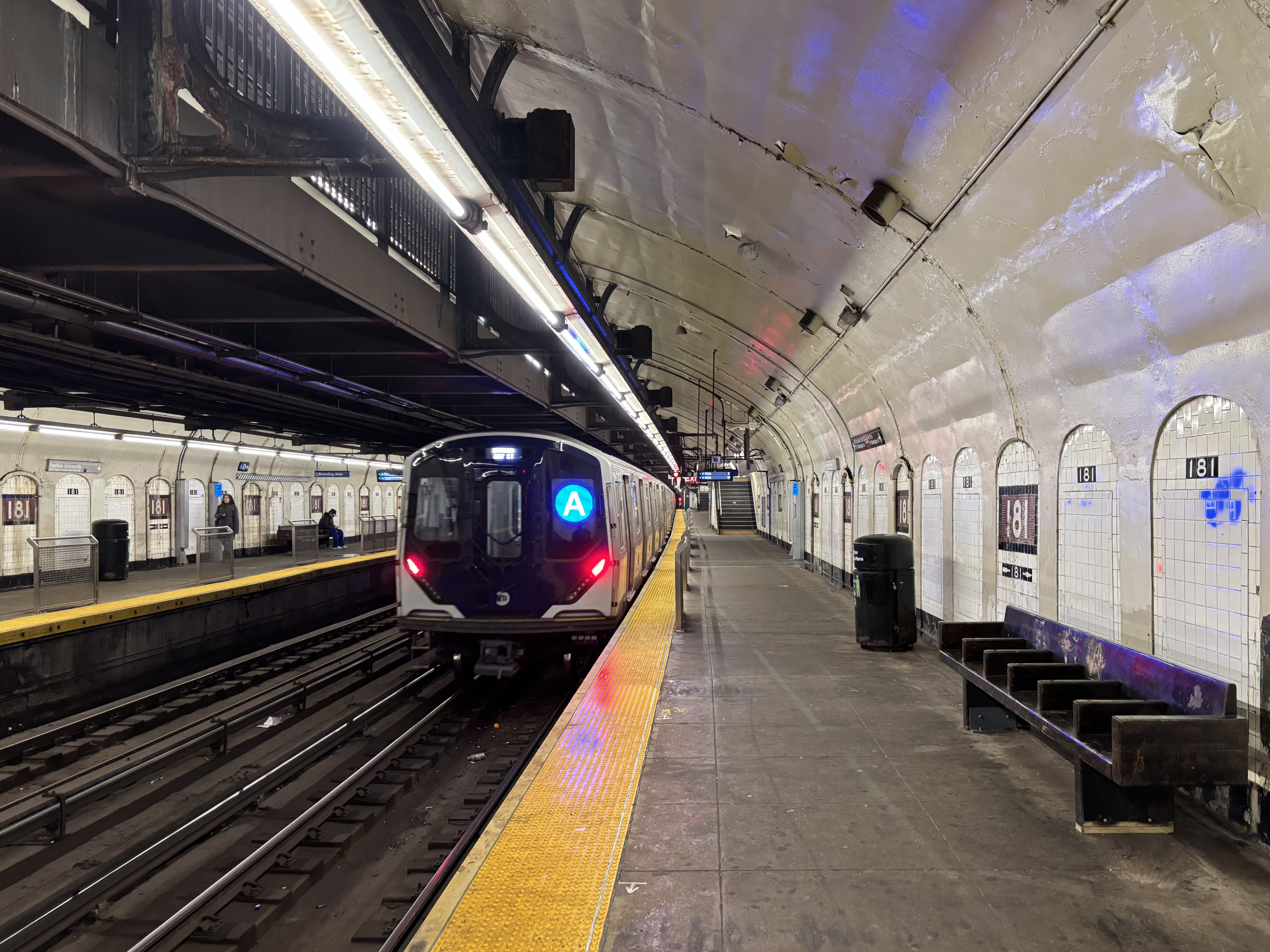
- Northbound R211A A train departing

Station statistics
- Address: West 181st Street & Fort Washington Avenue; New York, New York
- Borough: Manhattan
- Locale: Washington Heights, Hudson Heights
- Coordinates: 40.8517°N 73.9380°W
- Division: B (IND)
- Line: IND Eighth Avenue Line
- Services: A (all times)
- Transit: NYCT Bus: Bx3, Bx7, Bx11, Bx13, Bx35, Bx36, M4, M98, M100; GWB Bus Station
- Structure: Underground
- Platforms: 2 side platforms
- Tracks: 2

Other information
- Opened: September 10, 1932; 94 years ago
- Accessible: Yes
- Former/other names: 181st Street–Fort Washington Avenue
- Other entrances/ exits: Fort Washington Avenue & 184th Street, Overlook Terrace & 184th Street, east side of Fort Washington Avenue

Traffic
- 2025: 2,185,502 ▲8.1%
- Rank: 169 out of 423
Services
Preceding station	New York City Subway	Following station
190th Street toward Inwood–207th Street	A (New York City Subway service)	175th Street toward Far Rockaway–Mott Avenue or Ozone Park–Lefferts Boulevard
Location
Location within New York City Subway
Location within New York City
Location within New York
Track layout
Street map
Station service legend
Symbol	Description
Stops all times	Stops all times
- 181st Street Subway Station (IND)
- U.S. National Register of Historic Places
- New York State Register of Historic Places
- MPS: New York City Subway System MPS
- NRHP reference No.: 05000233
- NYSRHP No.: 06101.007642

Significant dates
- Added to NRHP: March 30, 2005
- Designated NYSRHP: December 18, 2004

The 181st Street station (also known as 181st Street–Fort Washington Avenue) is a station on the IND Eighth Avenue Line of the New York City Subway. It is located beneath Fort Washington Avenue in the Hudson Heights section of the Washington Heights neighborhood, between 181st and 184th Streets. The station is served by the A train at all times.

The 181st Street station opened in 1932 and has two tracks and two side platforms. It is located near Bennett Park, the highest natural point in Manhattan. The station has two exits to Fort Washington Avenue: one at 181st Street and another across from Bennett Park. A third entrance is at 184th Street and Overlook Terrace at the bottom of the hill; elevators connect the Bennett Park and Overlook Terrace entrances. The station is listed on the National Register of Historic Places.

== History ==
=== Construction and opening ===
New York City mayor John Francis Hylan's original plans for the Independent Subway System (IND), proposed in 1922, included building over 100 miles (160 km) of new lines and taking over nearly 100 miles (160 km) of existing lines. The lines were designed to compete with the existing underground, surface, and elevated lines operated by the Interborough Rapid Transit Company (IRT) and BMT. On December 9, 1924, the New York City Board of Transportation (BOT) gave preliminary approval for the construction of the IND Eighth Avenue Line. This line consisted of a corridor connecting Inwood, Manhattan, to Downtown Brooklyn, running largely under Eighth Avenue but also paralleling Greenwich Avenue and Sixth Avenue in Lower Manhattan. The line also included a tunnel under Fort Washington Avenue in Washington Heights, Manhattan. The BOT announced a list of stations on the new line in February 1928, with a station at 181st Street.

The BOT began constructing the 181st Street station in 1928. Squire J. Vickers, the chief architect of the Dual System, helped design the 181st Street station. He was responsible for most stations on the city-operated Independent Subway System (IND), and, being a painter, he did tile work for the station. Robert Ridgway was hired as the chief engineer. The finishes at the five stations between 175th and 207th Street, including the 181st Street station, were 18 percent completed by May 1930. By that August, the BOT reported that the Eighth Avenue Line was nearly completed and that the stations from 116th Street to 207th Street were 99.9 percent completed. The entire line was completed by September 1931, except for the installation of turnstiles.

A preview event for the new subway was hosted on September 8, 1932, two days before the official opening. The 181st Street station opened on September 10, 1932, as part of the city-operated IND's initial segment, the Eighth Avenue Line between Chambers Street and 207th Street. Construction of the whole line cost $191.2 million (equivalent to $4.511853659×10^{9} in 2025). Service at this station was provided with express service from its onset. While the IRT Broadway–Seventh Avenue Line already provided service to Washington Heights, the new subway via Fort Washington Avenue made subway service more readily accessible. Soon after the station opened, a bus route running over the George Washington Bridge began connecting this station to Fort Lee, New Jersey, for a fare of five cents. The construction of the station spurred development in the surrounding area. Its opening resulted in the development of residential apartment buildings around the station.

=== Operation ===
In December 1950, the New York City Board of Transportation issued a report concerning the construction of bomb shelters in the subway system in the midst of the Cold War. Five deep stations in Washington Heights, including the 181st Street station, were considered to be ideal for being used as bomb-proof shelters. The program was expected to cost $104 million (equivalent to $1.392 billion in 2025). These shelters were expected to provide limited protection against conventional bombs, while providing protection against shock waves and air blast, as well as from the heat and radiation from an atomic bomb. To become suitable as shelters, the stations would require water-supply facilities, first-aid rooms, and additional bathrooms. However, the program, which required federal funding, was never completed.

The 181st Street station is mostly unchanged from its original design, although it has deteriorated over time, with some water damage. On March 30, 2005, the 181st Street station was listed on the National Register of Historic Places. The station was considered historically and architecturally significant as an early IND station that retained many of its original features.

In May 2022, the three escalators leading to the 181st Street exit were all closed for repairs. As a result, riders had to either use the 184th Street exit or walk up nearly 90 steps. The escalators had suffered periodic outages over the years; they were all closed simultaneously because they were powered by the same motor. The replacement escalators opened in April 2023, two months behind schedule. In 2025, the MTA requested that the developer of a nearby parcel at 524 Fort Washington Avenue, adjacent to one of the 181st Street station's entrances, set aside space for a subway power station.

=== Elevator modifications ===
==== 1930s to 1990s ====
From 1932 until 1957, pedestrians had to pay a fare to use the elevators. Though the elevators were intended for subway riders, local residents paid the subway fare to avoid climbing about eight stories up Fort Washington Hill. On September 5, 1957, the New York City Transit Authority (NYCTA) began allowing free public access to the elevators at the 181st and 190th Street stations. Bills were proposed in the New York State Legislature to put the elevators out of fare control, but these failed in committee. The NYCTA agreed once Joseph Zaretzki, the local State Senator, requested the change.

During the 1970s, the NYCTA attempted to eliminate the elevator attendants at this station once the elevators become automatic, but was not able to do so as a state law was passed by the urging of local politicians that required them to stay on the job. For four months during 1999, the station was closed while repairs were made to the elevators.

==== 2000s to present ====
Several of the elevators in the station are staffed by elevator attendants, who are also employed at four other deep-level stations in Washington Heights. The elevator attendants are intended to reassure passengers, as the elevators are the only entrance to the platforms, and passengers often wait for the elevators with an attendant. The attendants at the five stations are primarily maintenance and cleaning workers who suffered injuries that made it hard for them to continue doing their original jobs. Riders of the 181st Street station have connected with the station's elevator attendants. For instance, in 2000, one elevator attendant put up images of popular jazz musicians while playing jazz music. The Metropolitan Transportation Authority (MTA) ordered the posters removed, but 300 residents protested their removal. The elevator attendants have been known to attempt to cheer up commuters by playing music. A 2003 New York Times article stated that one operator played calypso music and merengue music from a portable CD player, and that "on occasion a dour-faced occupant will execute a brief tap or samba step on the way out".

In July 2003, to reduce costs, the MTA announced that as part of its 2004 budget it would eliminate 22 elevator operator positions at the 181st Street station and four others in Washington Heights, leaving one full-time operator per station. The agency had intended to remove all the attendants at these stops, but kept one in each station after many riders protested. In addition, the MTA began operating all elevators at all times; prior to the change, each elevator only operated if it was staffed by an elevator operator. The change took effect on January 20, 2004, and was expected to save $1.15 million (equivalent to $2,012,708 in 2025) a year.

In November 2007, the MTA proposed savings cuts to help reduce the agency's deficit. As part of the plan, all elevator operators at 181st Street, along with those in four other stations in Washington Heights, would have been cut. MTA employees had joined riders in worrying about an increase in crime as a result of the cuts after an elevator operator at 181st Street on the Broadway–Seventh Avenue Line helped save a stabbed passenger. The move was intended to save $1.7 million a year. However, on December 7, 2007, the MTA announced that it would not remove the remaining elevator operators at these stations, due to pushback from elected officials and residents from the area. In October 2018, the MTA once again proposed removing the elevator operators at the five stations, but this was reversed after dissent from the Transport Workers' Union. The MTA again suggested reassigning elevator operators to station-cleaner positions in June 2023, prompting local politicians to sue to prevent the operators' reassignments.

The station's elevators closed for replacement on August 3, 2019, and reopened almost exactly a year later on August 2, 2020. The elevators that were replaced had been in service since the early 1930s, while the new elevators contained wider doors to allow for faster passenger entry and exit. During the replacement, the station remained open via the exits to 181st Street and Overlook Terrace.

As part of the MTA's 2020–2024 Capital Program, the 181st Street station was selected to receive elevators between the platforms and mezzanine as part of a process to expand the New York City Subway system's accessibility. By February 2021, funding had been committed to accessibility renovations at the 181st Street station. In December 2021, the MTA awarded a contract for the installation of elevators at eight stations, including the 181st Street station. As of May 2022, work on the ADA-accessible elevators was scheduled to begin in September 2022; at the time, the project was scheduled to be completed in June 2023. The platform elevators were eventually opened on December 7, 2023.

== Station layout ==
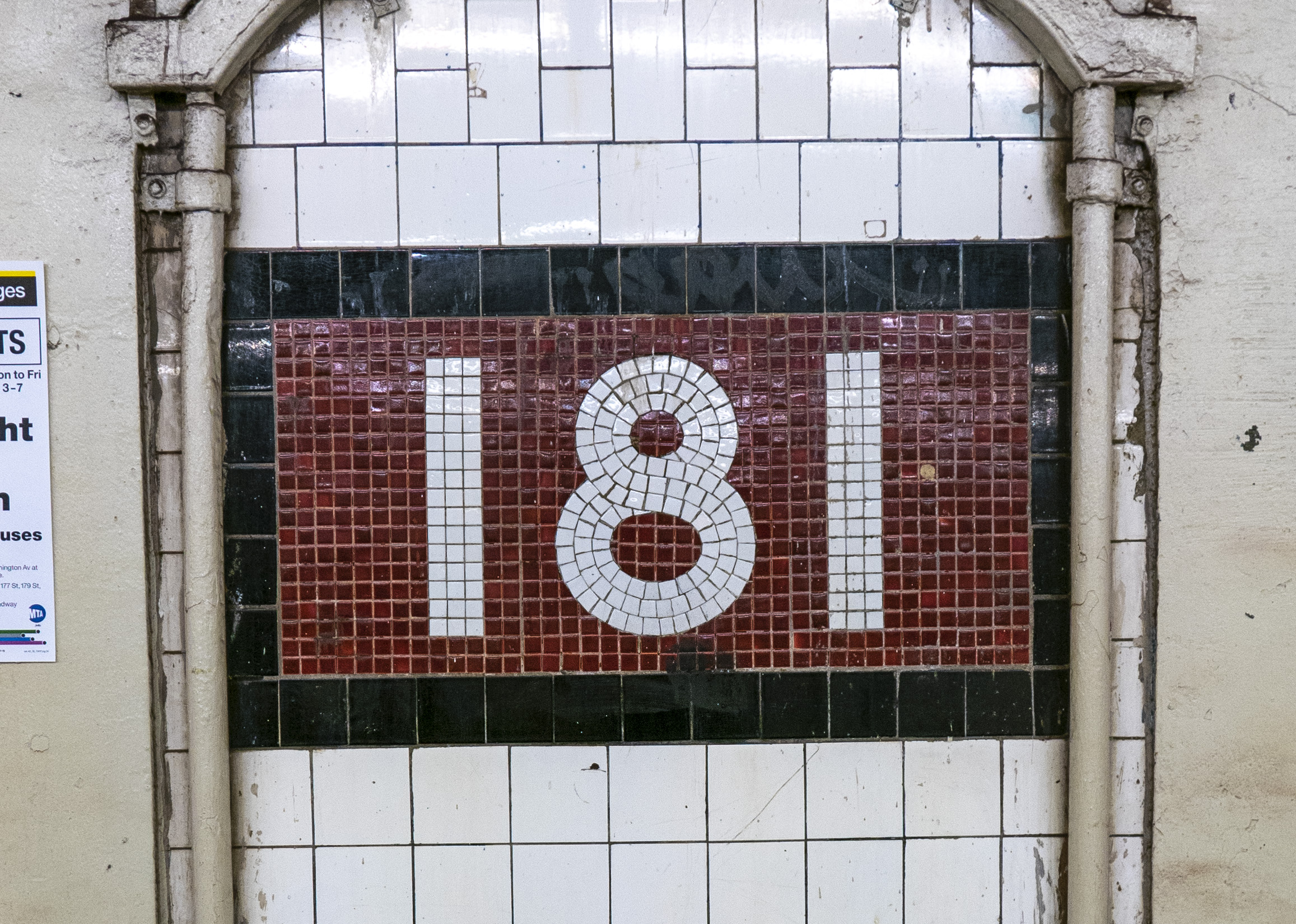
Mosaic name tablet

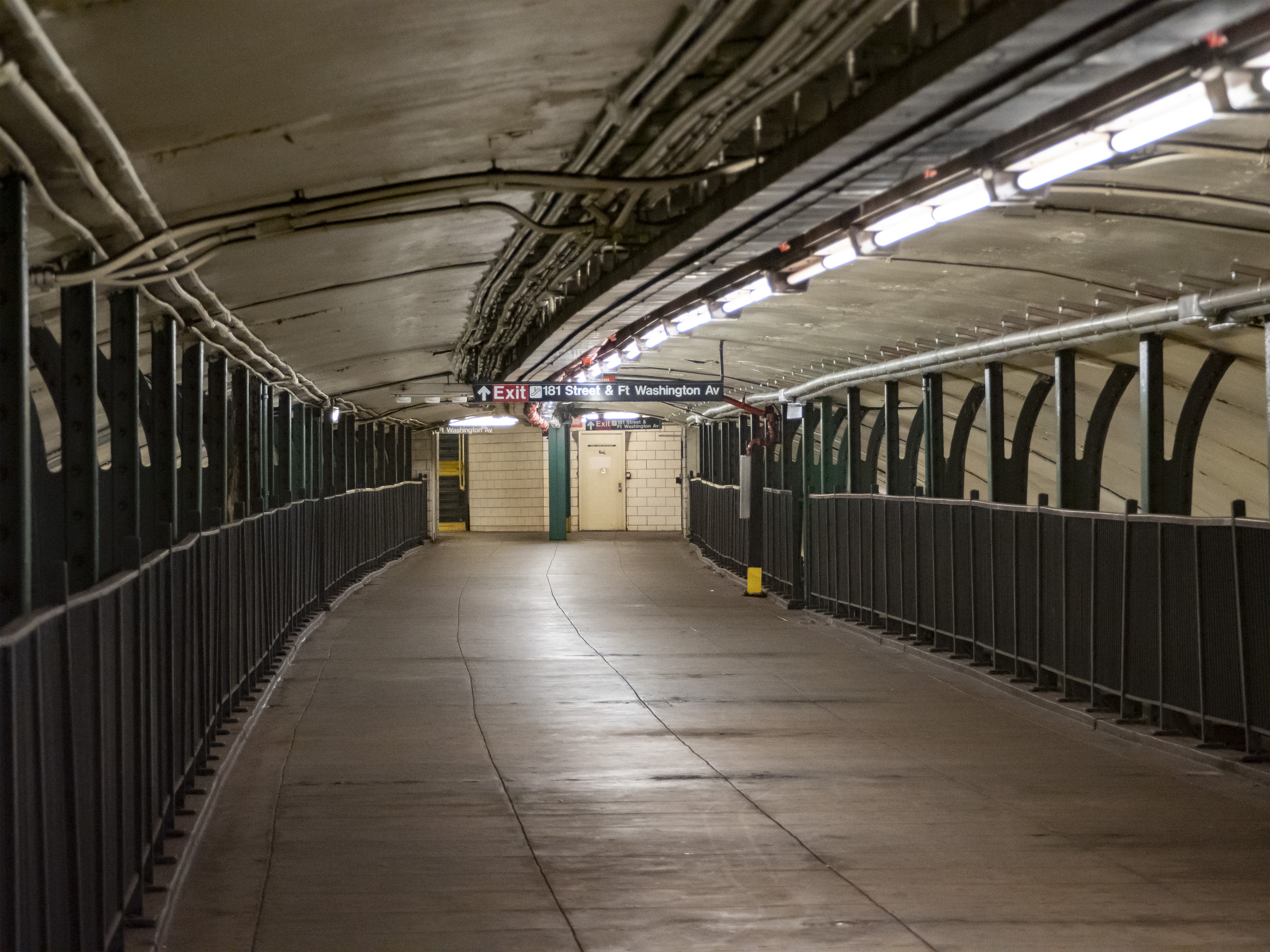
Concourse level, facing south

This underground station has two tracks and two side platforms. The station is served by the A train at all times; the next station northbound is 190th Street while the next station southbound is 175th Street. The station's platforms are 660 feet (200 m) long, a typical length of station platforms built by the Independent Subway System (IND), and the vault containing the station is 50 feet (15 m) wide. The platform level contains a single barrel-vaulted ceiling.

The outer walls of the platform level consist of tiled alcoves, slightly recessed within concrete arches. The station's tiles are colored maroon. This was part of a color-coded tile system used throughout the IND. The tile colors were designed to facilitate navigation for travelers going away from Lower Manhattan. As such, the maroon tiles used at the 181st Street station are also used at 168th Street, the first express station to the south, as well as at other stations on the Eighth Avenue Line north of 168th Street. Small maroon, black, and white mosaics with the number "181" are located within some of the alcoves. Within the alcoves that do not contain the "181" mosaic, there are black tiles with white numerals reading "181". The uptown platform has black-and-white signs for Yeshiva University.

A pedestrian concourse is located above the platforms along the station's entire length, supported from the cemented barrel-vaulted ceiling by steel Y-shaped struts. This concourse connects the two mezzanines at the north and south ends of the station and has four steel-and-concrete stairs to each platform. There are metal railings along the concourse, from which the platforms can be seen. The southern mezzanine has a station agent booth and storage rooms.

=== Entrances and exits ===
The 181st Street station has three entrances. Two of them are located at the top of a hill along Fort Washington Avenue: one between West 183rd and 185th Streets, across from Bennett Park, and the other at 181st Street. The third, at Overlook Avenue and 184th Street, is located at the bottom of a hill. The entrances at the 181st Street station were designed so as to not be sidewalk obstructions like those constructed by the Interborough Rapid Transit Company and the Brooklyn–Manhattan Transit Corporation, the two other subway operators in the city. To accomplish this goal, the entrance at Overlook Terrace was placed on city-owned property near the station, and the entrance at Fort Washington Avenue between 183rd and 185th Streets was placed in a building. The entrances at Fort Washington Avenue at 181st Street could not be erected within buildings.

The entrance at Overlook Terrace leads to a 240-foot (73 m) passageway to the northern mezzanine. This entrance is accessed from a single-story head house with a stepped roof and a facade of stone and ashlar. This headhouse contains two arches surrounded by interlacing diamond motifs; there are wooden doors within each arch. A backlit, Art Deco "Subway" sign is located above and in between the archways, atop a stone pedestal.

The entrance on Fort Washington Avenue between 183rd and 185th Streets leads to three elevators that descend 100 feet (30 m) to mezzanine level. It is entered from a single-story stone vestibule with a pointed diamond-shaped arch surrounded by an interlacing diamond motif. The arch is surrounded by zigzag motifs, and there is a backlit Art Deco "Subway" sign above this arch. In addition, four wooden doors are recessed within the entrance vestibule. The top of the entrance vestibule contains zigzagging horizontal lines. The vestibule leads to a slightly recessed masonry structure that rises two stories above the height of Fort Washington Avenue. The masonry structure forms the top of a seven-story mechanical structure with an emergency staircase, the three elevators, and the station's ventilation system.

The entrance at Fort Washington Avenue and 181st Street consists of four stairs, two to each southern corner of the intersection. These stairs lead to a small landing immediately below the intersection, which in turn leads to the escalators that descend to the southern mezzanine.

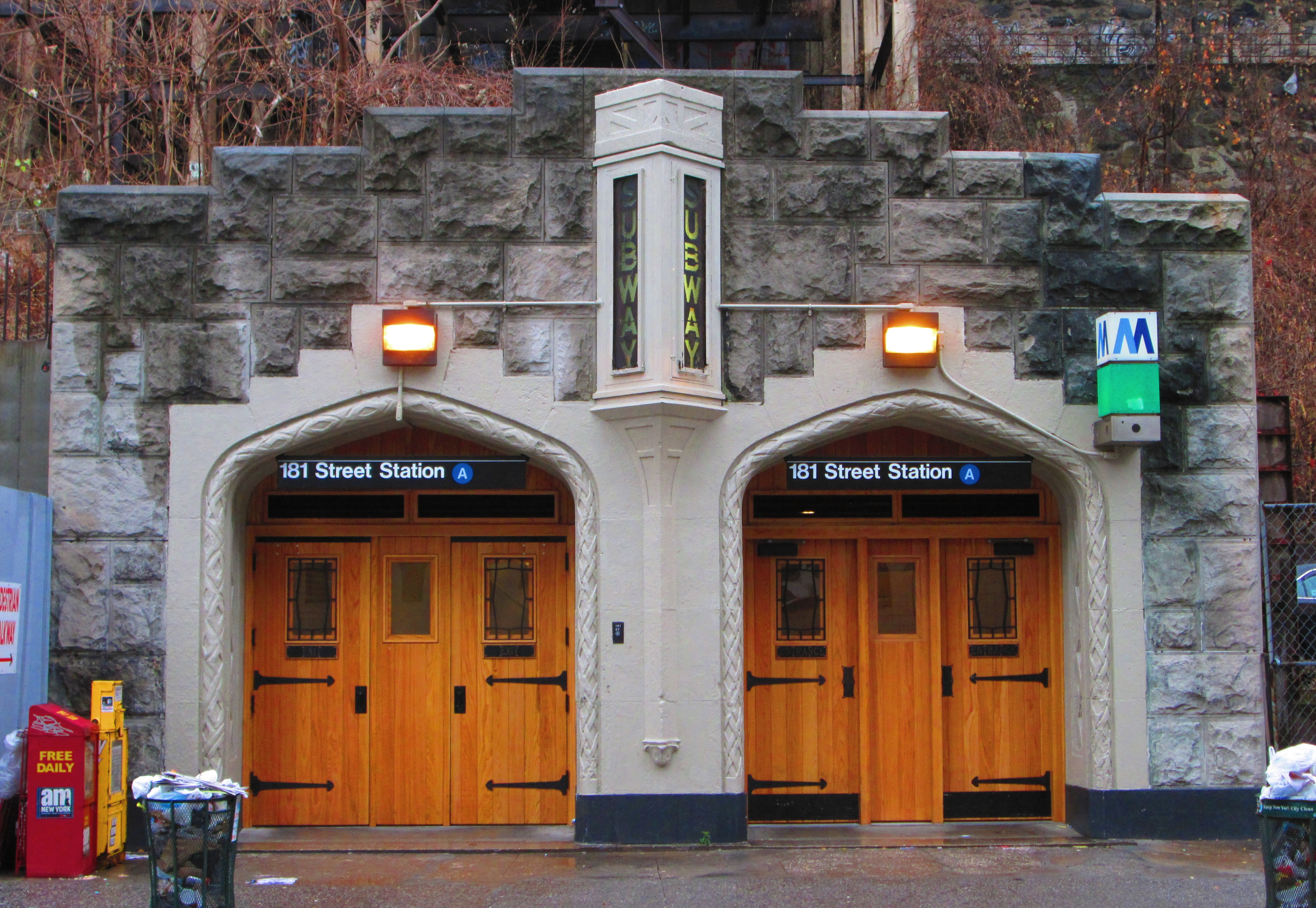
Overlook Terrace entrance at West 184th Street

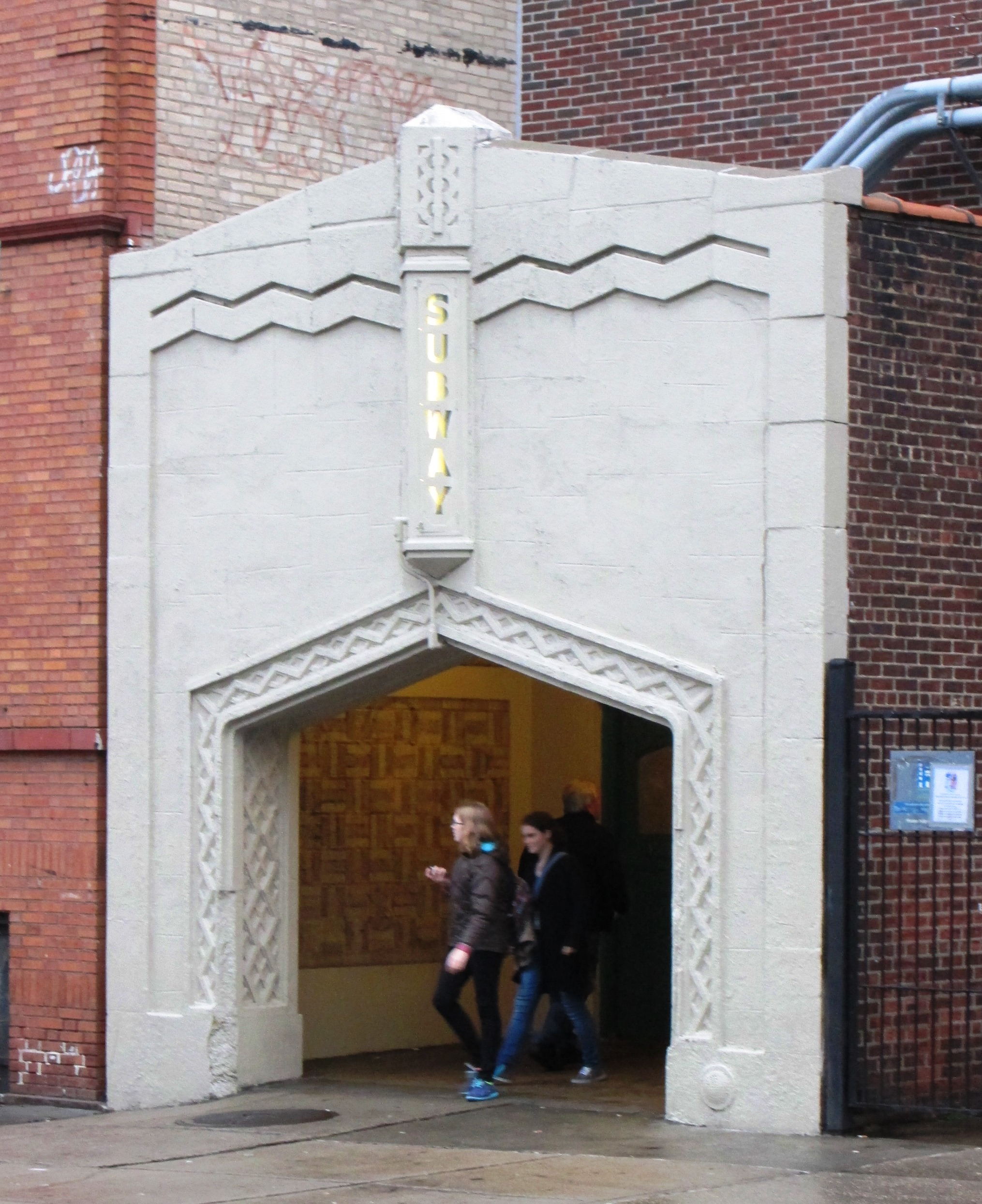
Fort Washington Avenue entrance between West 183rd and 185th Streets

=== Elevators ===
The highest natural point on Manhattan Island is in Bennett Park, adjacent to the station exit on Fort Washington Avenue between West 183rd and 185th Streets (along the axis of where West 184th Street would be located). Because of the station's depth, long escalators lead to 181st Street at the south end, and elevators at the north end of the station carry passengers to the Bennett Park exit. The elevators were formerly only open during the daytime and required the payment of a fare to use. Since 1957, the elevators have not required the payment of a fare, so pedestrians traveling between Overlook Terrace and Fort Washington Avenue are allowed to use the elevators for free. There are also free elevators for pedestrians at 190th Street, the next station uptown, as well as at 191st Street on the IRT Broadway–Seventh Avenue Line.

Additional elevators were announced between the platforms and mezzanine in December 2019 as part of the agency's 2020–2024 Capital Program and were completed in 2023, making the station ADA-accessible. Patrons with wheelchairs are able to traverse from this entrance to the passageway out to Overlook Terrace, as the elevators provide direct access to both the mezzanine and street level. A ramp bypasses a short set of steps between the Overlook Terrace entrance and the passageway, making that entrance ADA-accessible. There is a staircase available in case of an emergency.

== Bus service ==
The station and the nearby George Washington Bridge Bus Station are served by ten local MTA Regional Bus Operations routes and various interstate bus routes.

Route	Operator	North/West Terminal	South/East Terminal	via	notes
Local Bus Routes
M4	New York City Bus	The Cloisters or Fort Tryon Park	Fifth Avenue/32nd Street, Koreatown	Broadway and Fifth Avenue	Bus only runs to the Cloisters when the museum is open; it only runs to Fort Tryon Park at all other times.
M5	New York City Bus	Broadway at West 179th Street	Broadway/31st Street, Garment District	Riverside Drive, Fifth Avenue, and Broadway	
M98 LTD	New York City Bus	Fort Tryon Park	68th Street/Lexington Avenue	Harlem River Drive and Lexington Avenue	Bus only runs during rush hours.
M100	New York City Bus	West 220th Street/Broadway, Inwood	West 125th Street/Amsterdam Avenue, Manhattanville	Broadway and Amsterdam Avenues	
Bx3	New York City Bus	238th Street station, Riverdale, Bronx	West 179th Street east of Broadway	University Avenue	
Bx7	New York City Bus	West 263rd Street/Riverdale Avenue, Riverdale, Bronx	168th Street station	Broadway, Johnson Avenue, Henry Hudson Parkway	
Bx11	New York City Bus	West 179th Street west of Broadway	Simpson Street station, Longwood, Bronx	170th Street	
Bx13	New York City Bus	West 179th Street west of Broadway	Bronx Terminal Market (extended to Third Avenue/163rd Street, rush hours)	Ogden Avenue and Yankee Stadium	
Bx35	New York City Bus	West 179th Street east of Broadway	Simpson Street station, Longwood, Bronx	167th/169th Streets	
Bx36	New York City Bus	West 179th Street west of Broadway	Olmstead Avenue/Seaward Avenue, Castle Hill, Bronx	174th/180th Streets	
Other bus routes
George Washington Bridge Bus Station routes	Various	George Washington Bridge Bus Station			

== In popular culture ==
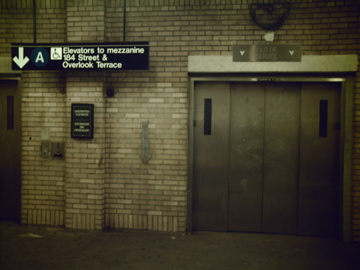
The upper mezzanine's elevator bank

The station is mentioned in the title song of the Broadway musical In the Heights by Lin-Manuel Miranda, where Usnavi says to take the A train "even farther than Harlem to Northern Manhattan and maintain, get off at 181st and take the escalator. I hope you're writing this down I'm gonna test ya later".

On September 13, 1980, aspiring pianist Eric Kaminsky was robbed and stabbed to death in the station. His murder became the basis for his mother's book The Victim's Song.

== See also ==
- National Register of Historic Places listings in Manhattan above 110th Street
