= Dyckman Street station =

Dyckman Street station may refer to:

- Dyckman Street station (IRT Broadway–Seventh Avenue Line)
- Dyckman Street station (IND Eighth Avenue Line)
