= Dyckman Street (disambiguation) =

Dyckman Street may refer to:

- Dyckman Street, a street in the Inwood neighborhood of Manhattan, New York City

== New York City Subway stations ==
- Dyckman Street (IND Eighth Avenue Line), serving the A train
- Dyckman Street (IRT Broadway – Seventh Avenue Line), serving the 1 train
