= Coffeed =

Coffee company

- Founded: September 2012
- Founder: Frank Raffaele
- Defunct: December 2019
- Headquarters: Long Island City, Queens, New York City, United States
- Products: Coffee

Coffeed was a "philanthropic artisanal coffee company" with its headquarters in Queens, New York City, USA. The company opened its flagship location in Long Island City in September 2012. As of June 2019, the flagship location on Northern Boulevard closed and the LIC Landing became the new flagship location. By February 2016, Coffeed had a dozen locations in the New York area and one in Seoul, South Korea. Included among them are LIC Landing, an outdoor café in Hunter's Point South Park, and New Leaf, a restaurant in Manhattan's Fort Tryon Park.

Coffeed closed all locations, and ceased operating in December 2019.

== Business model, charitable partners ==
Each Coffeed location donated a portion of its revenue (usually 3-10%) to a charitable partner based in the same neighborhood as the store. Former partners included The New York Foundling, New York Restoration Project (NYRP), City Growers, and Community Mainstreaming Associates. As of 2016, Coffeed had donated nearly $250,000 to charity.
