= Fort Tryon Park =

Public park in Manhattan, New York

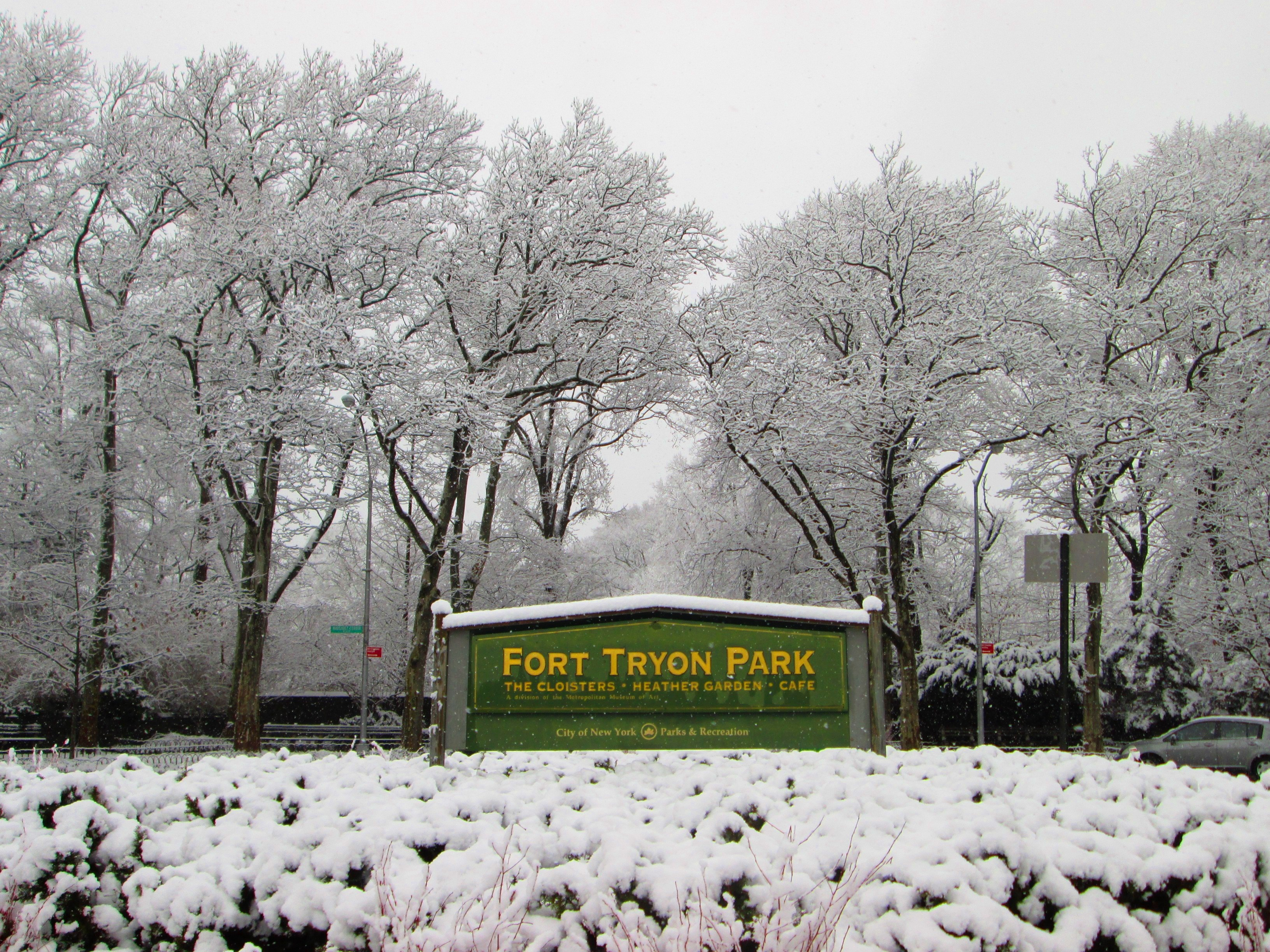
- (2013)
- Interactive map of Fort Tryon Park
- Location: Hudson Heights/Inwood, Manhattan, New York
- Coordinates: 40°51′39″N 73°55′57″W
- Area: 67.21 acres (27 ha)
- Elevation: 268 feet (82 m)
- Created: 1935
- Designer: Olmsted Brothers
- Etymology: Sir William Tryon
- Operator: NYC Parks
- Open: 6 a.m. to 1 a.m.
- Status: Open all year
- Public transit: Subway: to 190th Street or Dyckman Street; Bus: M4, M98, M100, Bx7
- Website: Official website
- Fort Tryon Park and the Cloisters
- U.S. National Register of Historic Places
- U.S. Historic district
- New York State Register of Historic Places
- New York City Landmark
- Location within New York City
- Location: Bounded by 190th Street, Cabrini Boulevard, 192nd Street, Bennett Avenue, Broadway, Riverside Drive, and Henry Hudson Parkway; Manhattan, New York City
- Coordinates: 40°51′39″N 73°55′57″W
- Area: 66.5 acres (26.9 ha)
- Built: 1935
- Architects: Olmsted Brothers (Frederick Law Olmsted Jr., James W. Dawson)
- Architectural style: Romanesque
- NRHP reference No.: 78001870
- NYSRHP No.: 06101.000565
- NYCL No.: 0835 (The Cloisters); 1417 (Fort Tryon Park)

Significant dates
- Added to NRHP: December 19, 1978
- Designated NYSRHP: June 23, 1980
- Designated NYCL: March 19, 1974 (The Cloisters); September 20, 1983 (Fort Tryon Park)

Fort Tryon Park is a public park located in the Washington Heights and Inwood neighborhoods of the borough of Manhattan in New York City. The 67-acre (27 ha) park is situated on a ridge in Upper Manhattan, close to the Hudson River to the west. It extends mostly from 192nd Street in the south to Riverside Drive in the north, and from Broadway in the east to the Henry Hudson Parkway in the west. The main entrance to the park is at Margaret Corbin Circle, at the intersection of Fort Washington Avenue and Cabrini Boulevard.

The area was known by the local Lenape tribe as Chquaesgeck and by Dutch settlers as Lange Bergh (Long Hill). During the American Revolutionary War, the Battle of Fort Washington was fought at the site of the park on November 16, 1776. The area remained sparsely populated during the 19th century, but by the turn of the 20th century, it was the location of large country estates.

Beginning in January 1917, philanthropist John D. Rockefeller Jr. bought up the Tryon Hall estate of Chicago industrialist C. K. G. Billings and several others to create Fort Tryon Park. He engaged the Olmsted Brothers firm to design the park and hired James W. Dawson to create the planting plan. Rockefeller gave the land to the city in 1931, after two prior attempts to do so were unsuccessful, and the park was completed in 1935. Rockefeller also bought sculptor George Gray Barnard's collection of medieval art and gave it to the Metropolitan Museum of Art, which from 1935 to 1939 built the Cloisters in Fort Tryon Park to house the collection.

The park is built on a high formation of Manhattan schist with igneous intrusions and glacial striations from the last ice age. The park's design included extensive plantings of various flora in the park's many gardens, including the Heather Garden, which was restored in the 1980s. Besides the gardens and the Cloisters, the park has extensive walking paths and meadows, with views of the Hudson and Harlem Rivers. Fort Tryon Park was added to the National Register of Historic Places on December 19, 1978, and was designated a New York City scenic landmark in 1983.

== Geography and geology ==
Fort Tryon Park covers 67.21 acres (27.20 ha). It is bounded on the west by the Henry Hudson Parkway, on the north by Riverside Drive, on the east by Broadway and Bennett Avenue, and on the south by the alignment of 192nd Street. A small section at the park's southwestern corner is located between Cabrini Boulevard to the east and Henry Hudson Parkway to the west, and is bounded to the south by 190th Street. The park is adjacent to Inwood Hill Park to the north and Fort Washington Park and Riverside Park to the south; all are part of the Manhattan Waterfront Greenway. The park offers views of the Hudson River, the George Washington Bridge, and the New Jersey Palisades, to the west; Washington Heights to the south; Inwood and the Bronx to the north; and the Harlem River to the east. The north–south Henry Hudson Parkway and Amtrak's Empire Connection run alongside the western edge of the park.

The park is built on a formation of Manhattan schist and contains examples of igneous intrusions and of glacial striations from the last ice age. The lower lying regions to the east and north of the park are built on Inwood marble. Outcroppings of gneiss and schist can be seen interlaid with the marble, as seen in the outcroppings at the park's edges. Fort Tryon Park also contains a large glacial pothole.

The northern boundary of the park is formed by the seismologically active Dyckman Street Fault. The fault creates a valley separating Fort Tryon Park from Inwood Hill Park to the north. In precolonial times, a Native American road ran within this valley from the present-day intersection of Broadway and Dyckman Street to a settlement on the Hudson River. The valley formerly contained an inlet named Little Sand Bay, which flowed into the Hudson River to the west. As recently as 1989, activity of this fault caused a magnitude 2 earthquake.

Another valley separated Fort Washington from a hill to the east, which hosted Fort George. This valley contained a stream, which was known as the Hessian Spring. The stream emptied into Half Creek (later Sherman Creek), which in turn led to the Harlem River to the east.

== History ==
=== Site ===
The northern portion of Manhattan was first known to be inhabited by the Wecquaesgeek tribe of Lenape Native Americans, who referred to the area around Fort Tryon Park as Chquaesgeck. When Dutch settlers inhabited the lower Hudson Valley in the early 17th century, they attempted to force the Native Americans out, and some of the Wecquaesgeeks continued to occupy the area. The tribe had moved out by 1669, but continued to hold onto their land claims until 1715. The Dutch referred to the park site as Lange Bergh (Long Hill), a name first given by Dutch settler Joost van Oblienus in 1691. At the time, Long Hill was a heavily wooded area that was part of the town of Harlem. As late as the 17th century, wild animals could be hunted on the northern portion of the hill, within the park's present site. In 1711, Harlem's political leaders decreed that a road be built through the area. When Harlem was subdivided the following year, the hill was split into multiple smaller lots.

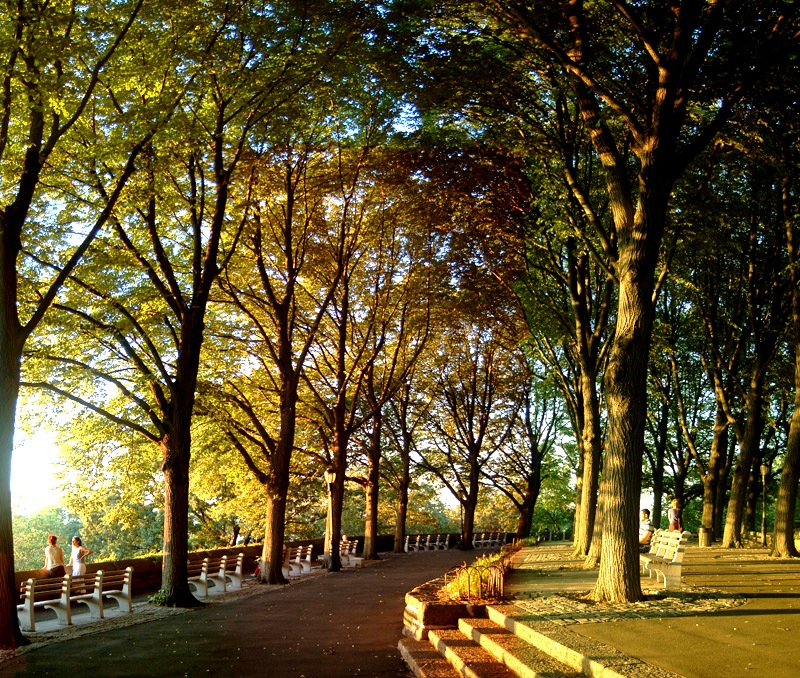
Linden Terrace, located on the site of Fort Tryon

During the American Revolutionary War, the trees were cleared to make way for fortifications. At the time, Long Hill had been known as Mount Washington, while an outcropping in the center of the site was called Forest Hill. The latter was part of a series of fortifications that lined the steep cliff within the park site, which was known by the Americans as Fort Washington. The actual site of Fort Washington is less than a mile south at Bennett Park. The park was an ancillary site of the Battle of Fort Washington, fought on November 16, 1776, between 2,900 American soldiers and 8,000 invading Hessian troops hired by Great Britain. Despite the American Continental Army's strategic position at the top of Long Hill, they were defeated after holding out for two hours. American soldier Margaret Corbin became the first woman to fight in the war and was injured during the battle; the southern entrance to the park bears her name. After the British victory, the outpost on Forest Hill was named after William Tryon, the last British Governor of the Province of New York (1771–1777). The British made improvements to Fort Tryon, using it as Upper Manhattan's primary defensive post, before peacefully withdrawing from Manhattan in 1783. The Tryon name persisted even after the British withdrawal, even as many other colonial place names were being expunged of their British influence.

As New York City expanded and prospered following the end of the Revolutionary War, the land comprising the park remained undeveloped, except for a few country estates. The first of these was created by Dr. Samuel Watkins, founder of Watkins Glen, who took ownership of multiple plots in 1818. Ownership of the Watkins estate passed to Lucius Chittenden, a merchant originally from New Orleans, in 1844. The Chittenden family owned the land until 1871. Part of the estate was sold in 1855 to August C. Richards, who built a Gothic-style stone castle called "Woodcliff", designed by Alexander Jackson Davis. Woodcliff was subsequently used as a summer home by General Daniel Butterfield, Boss Tweed, Alexander Turney Stewart, and William Libbey, whereupon it became known as "Libby Castle". Another portion of the Chittenden site was developed by William C. Muschenheim, later an operator of the Hotel Astor, who built an estate called "Fort Tryon Terrace". In contrast with the elaborate estates at the top of Fort Tryon, the plateau to the east was known as "Poverty Hollow" by 1851.

Between 1901 and 1905, C. K. G. Billings combined Chittenden's, Muschenheim's, and Libbey's properties into a single estate. On the site, he built "Tryon Hall", a Châteauesque-style mansion with a swimming pool, horse stables, a formal garden, pergolas, and a winding 2,000-foot-long (610 m) driveway leading from Riverside Drive. The mansion also contained boat docks on the Hudson River and a garage to house his collection of 13 automobiles. Billings lived at Tryon Hall until 1915. Immediately to the north were Abbey Inn, a summer residence built on land that Willam Henry Hays had purchased in 1842, and another estate that Walter S. Sheafer, the state geologist of Pennsylvania, had bought in 1891.

=== Acquisition and planning ===
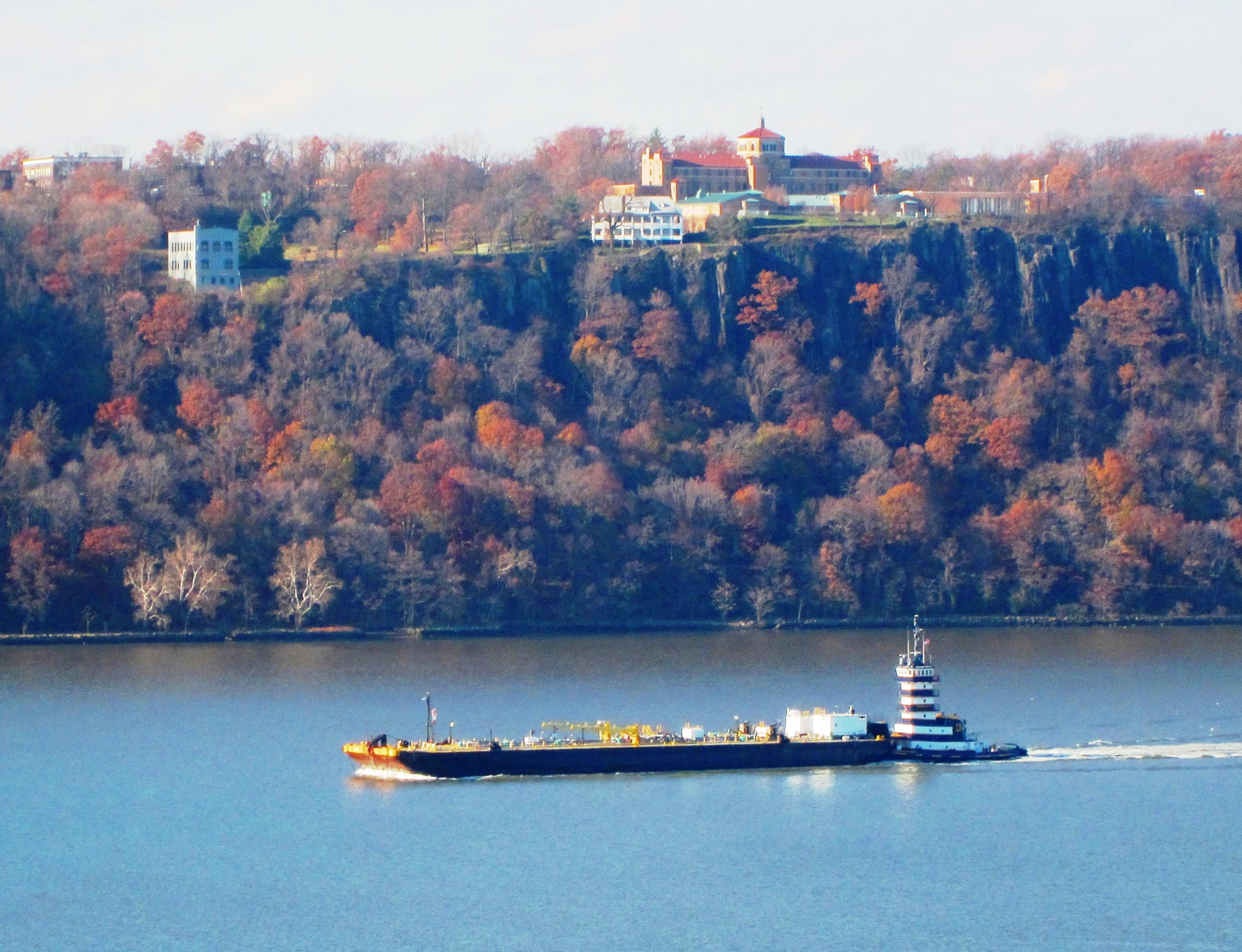
The view from Linden Terrace to the west: a barge on the Hudson River and the Hudson Palisades beyond, with the Englewood Cliffs campus of Saint Peter's University on the top

The philanthropist John D. Rockefeller Jr. had held an interest in Fort Tryon since childhood, when he and his father had taken walks in Fort Tryon. In January 1917, Rockefeller anonymously purchased the 33 acres (13 ha) that collectively comprised the Hays and Sheafer tracts, Shortly afterward, a New York Times article publicized the sale, and Rockefeller acquired the 25-acre (10 ha) Billings estate for $35,000 an acre.

In June 1917, Rockefeller announced that Fort Tryon Park would be given to the city on the conditions that it be joined to the existing Fort Washington and Riverside Parks, and that the city maintain the park. Rockefeller also donated land on the opposite bank of the Hudson to the Palisades Interstate Park in 1933; that land would be taken over by the Palisades Interstate Park Commission, which had operated the Palisades Interstate Park in New Jersey since 1900. According to the Palisades Interstate Park Commission's website, there is an often-repeated claim that the land in New Jersey was bought to preserve views from Fort Tryon Park; however, the Palisades land was purchased years before Fort Tryon Park was opened to the public. In any case, Rockefeller planned to run a ferry service across the Hudson River between Fort Tryon and the Palisades on the river's western bank. Mayor John Purroy Mitchel was positioned to accept Rockefeller's offer. However, his successor John Francis Hylan ultimately did not accept the land, saying that the site had not been "improved". Moreover, the city had failed to propose a law that would have deeded the parkland to the Palisades Interstate Park Commission. In 1925, Hylan told one of Rockefeller's advisors that the city would consider another proposal to take the land and use it as a park. Following this, Rockefeller again offered the land to the city in 1926, though without success.

In preparation for converting the land into a city park, Rockefeller hired the Olmsted Brothers firm, particularly Frederick Law Olmsted Jr., son of the designer of Central Park. Olmsted's design capitalized on the topography to reveal sweeping vistas of the Hudson River and the Palisades. Olmsted Jr. was guided by the four principles of park design that his father had established in creating Central Park: the beautiful, as seen in small open lawns; the picturesque, as shown in wooded slopes; the sublime, represented in the vistas of the Hudson River; and the gardenesque, exemplified by the park's Heather and Alpine Gardens. Olmsted Jr. had a preliminary report in 1927 and conducted a more exhaustive study in 1928–1930. In addition, James W. Dawson was hired to create a park-planting plan.

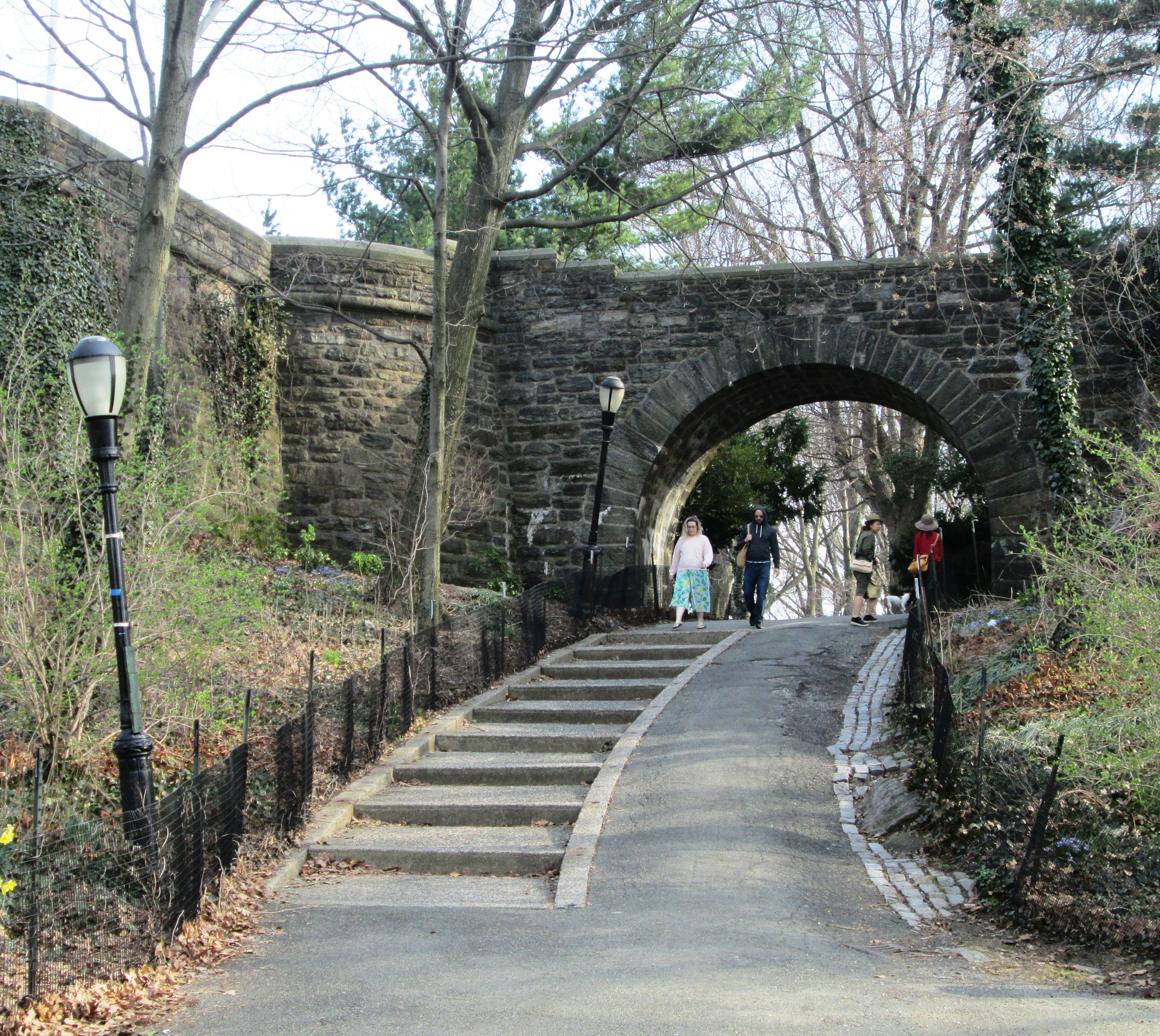
Archway and path under Linden Terrace

Rockefeller also bought sculptor George Gray Barnard's collection of medieval art in 1925. He added several artworks to the collection, which became a branch of the Metropolitan Museum of Art (Met) in 1926. Rockefeller retained Barnard as an advisor for the collection, and they collectively decided to add a museum for the collection at Fort Tryon Park, which they chose for its elevation, views, and accessible but isolated location. The Billings mansion, which was originally supposed to house the collection, was destroyed in a March 1926 fire that burned down everything except the walls. In June 1930, Rockefeller offered 56 acres (23 ha) of the park to the city for a third time, though he reserved 4 acres (1.6 ha) for the future museum. Rockefeller also offered to improve the grounds for $2 million, though the city would be responsible for improving utilities in the park. In his letter offering the park to the city, Rockefeller proposed to name the park after Fort Tryon, but in September 1930, historian Reginald Pelham Bolton said that Rockefeller actually preferred to have the park be named "Forest Hill Park". In early 1931, the city moved to accept Rockefeller's offer.

=== Construction ===
Construction of the park began in August 1931, before the city had accepted the deed to the land on December 28, 1931. The work provided many jobs during the Great Depression. The work included numerous smaller projects such as destruction of the old Billings estate; grading of the terrain; constructing structures such as arches and balconies; planting trees, shrubs, and lawns; and cutting into the ridge of the west side of the park to create an extension of Riverside Drive. Some 36,000 cubic yards (28,000 m^{3}) of Manhattan schist were used in the project, while an average of 350 workers were employed during each day of work. Construction progressed quickly and by February 1932, it was reported that Fort Tryon Park was 42% complete. Rockefeller bought an additional two plots from the Met totaling about 1 acre (0.40 ha) in June 1932. The following year, he offered to landscape the additional plots at his own expense, and the city accepted that land.

The project included the construction of the New York City Subway's IND Eighth Avenue Line, served by the modern-day A train, which contains two stations serving the park (see § Transportation). The line, which crosses directly under the park between the two stations, opened in late 1932. By March 1934, it was reported that the park was nearly complete, but that an additional $500,000 was needed for improvements. The Public Works Administration subsequently gave mayor Fiorello H. La Guardia and New York City parks commissioner Robert Moses $800,000 in funds to complete the park. The playground at the northeast corner of the park, at Broadway and Dyckman Street, was opened on September 6, 1934. The park was dedicated on October 12, 1935 by Rockefeller & Moses. In total, Rockefeller had spent $3.6 million toward the park's construction. Upon Fort Tryon Park's opening, Upper Manhattan had nearly 600 acres (240 ha) of parkland split among several non-contiguous sites, including Fort Tryon, Fort Washington, Inwood Hill, and Highbridge Parks.

In April 1935, construction started on the Cloisters, the Met's medieval art museum within the park. The museum, designed by Charles Collens, incorporated several medieval buildings that were purchased in Europe, brought to the United States, and reassembled, often stone by stone. The first portions of the Cloisters were opened to the public in May 1938, and the museum was completed the following year.

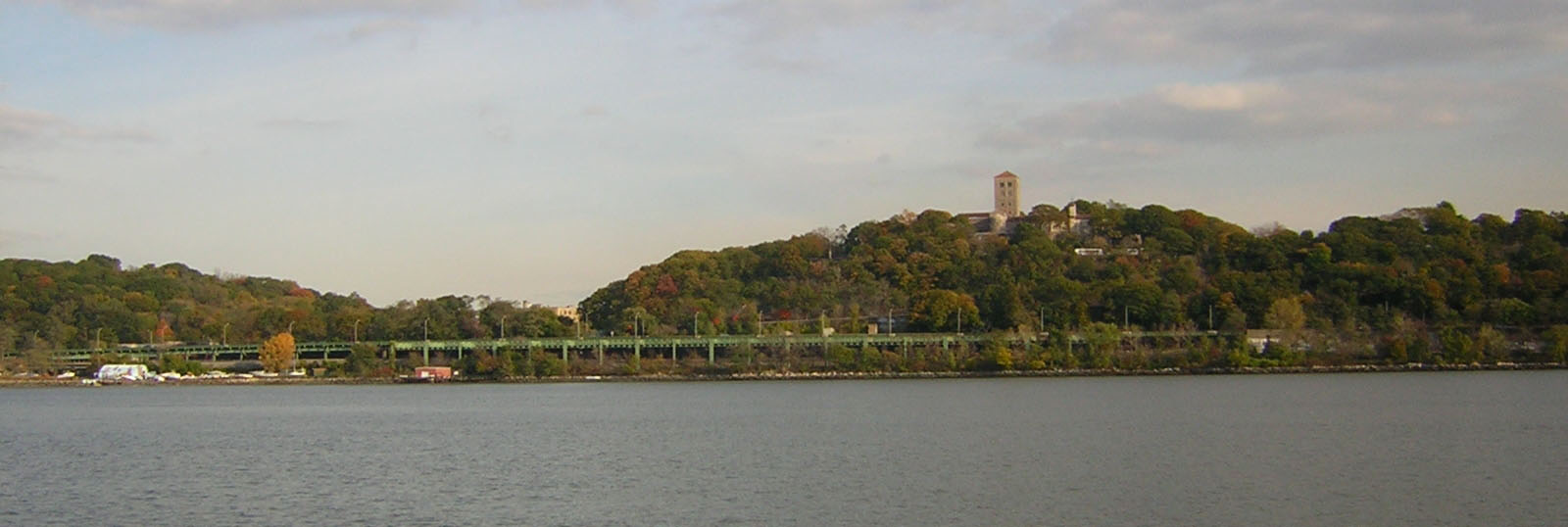
A view of the park from the Hudson River; The Cloisters can be seen at the top of the hill on the right. The green elevated highway is the Henry Hudson Parkway

=== Mid-20th century and decline ===
In the years following Fort Tryon Park's opening, several improvements were made to the park. In 1936, the Met gave the city a small portion of the land intended for the Cloisters, thereby increasing Fort Tryon Park's area slightly. In 1939, Rockefeller announced that he had given the city an additional 1.75 acres (0.71 ha) of vacant land adjacent to Fort Tryon Park, which the city would convert into another playground. The new playground was dedicated in 1941.

During the years before World War I, the future park's name was shared by the neighborhood to its south. The area between Broadway and the Hudson River, as far south as West 179th Street, was known as Fort Tryon. By the 1940s the neighborhood was known as Frankfurt-on-the-Hudson, a name that by the 1990s had given way to Hudson Heights. In the 1970s, a retired furniture salesman named Robert Hoffman led an initiative to rename Fort Tryon Park, following an interaction where Hoffman heard a group of tourists laugh upon hearing about the park's etymology. His efforts led Hope Irvine, a co-chairperson of Manhattan Community Board 12's Bicentennial Committee, to suggest Margaret Corbin's name for the park. The Cloisters objected to the entire park's renaming but reached a compromise to rename the park's southern entrance plaza and the main road. This led to the New York City Council voting to rename these features after Margaret Corbin in 1977.

As the City of New York suffered severe budget constraints in the 1970s, especially in the aftermath of the 1975 New York City fiscal crisis, funds for parks were decimated. Fort Tryon Park's gardens, woodlands, and playgrounds fell into disuse and disrepair. The park's concession building was closed in 1976 following a major fire. Decline continued until the 1980s when funds became available and restoration efforts began. Numerous crimes were recorded in the park in the 1980s. These included the discoveries of several corpses, including that of a missing 9-year-old girl in 1986, and that of a 19-year-old woman who was strangled in 1989. However, there were perceptions that crime in Fort Tryon Park was overlooked due to its relatively remote position. In April 1989, the beating and rape of a woman in Central Park received national media attention, but a similar attack on another woman in Fort Tryon Park the same month was sparsely covered even by local media.

=== Late-20th and early-21st century improvements ===
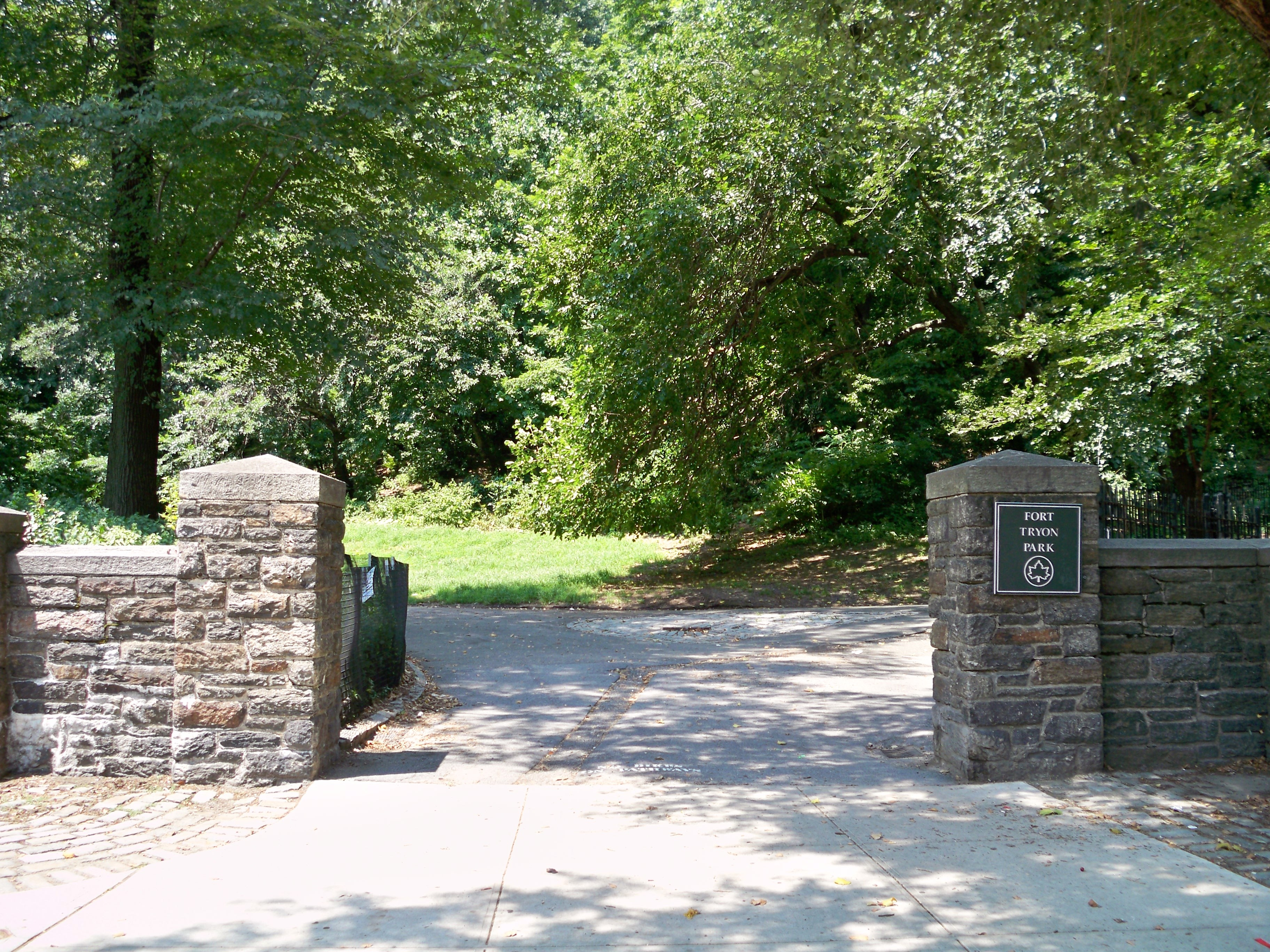
One of the park's entrances

In 1983, the New York City Landmarks Preservation Commission made Fort Tryon Park an official scenic landmark. The next year, a plan for the park's complete renovation was unveiled. The Greenacre Foundation, an organization created by John Rockefeller Jr.'s only daughter Abby Rockefeller Mauzé, donated $10 million toward the restoration in advance of the park's 50th anniversary in 1985. Among the first features to receive improvements was the Heather Garden, which was restored over three years by a partnership between the New York City Department of Parks and Recreation (NYC Parks), the Greenacre Foundation, and volunteers. The concession building was restored beginning in 1995 by the New York Restoration Project (NYRP), a nonprofit organization operated by Bette Midler, which started operating a cafe there in 2001. The Anne Loftus Playground at the park's northeast corner was also restored between 1995 and 1997, and the Javits Playground at the southern border was restored around the same time. The nonprofit Fort Tryon Park Trust was founded in 1998 to help maintain the park. In 2001, the trust raised $200,000 toward the further restoration of the Heather Garden. The Sir William Dog Run opened the same year.

The park was still the site of crimes, despite being much safer than in previous years. After an incident where a jogger was raped in the early morning in 1997, NYC Parks considered proposals to close the park's roads at night. Met officials opposed the move because it would block access to the Cloisters, but NYC Parks eventually agreed to place wooden barriers to allow Met staff access at night. The New York Times stated that the park had gained the perception among local residents and park officials "as something of a nighttime haven for vandals, drug users and even car thieves", and had seen eight abandoned cars in 1997 alone. Following additional crimes in the 2000s, cameras were installed in the park in 2011.

NYC Parks and the Fort Tryon Park Trust started restoring the park's eastern side in 2006. The restoration of the overgrown Alpine Garden was completed in 2009 in advance of the park's 75th anniversary the following year. On June 15, 2010, the park celebrated its 75th anniversary with a fundraiser and fireworks display. After the concession building was closed in 2014 for roof renovations, the operation of the restaurant was taken over in 2015 by Queens-based cafe Coffeed. A renovation of the Jacob K. Javits Playground started in July 2018 and was completed in March 2020. The Anne Loftus Playground was temporarily closed in August 2021, and it reopened in October 2022 after a $4.2 million renovation.

== Design ==
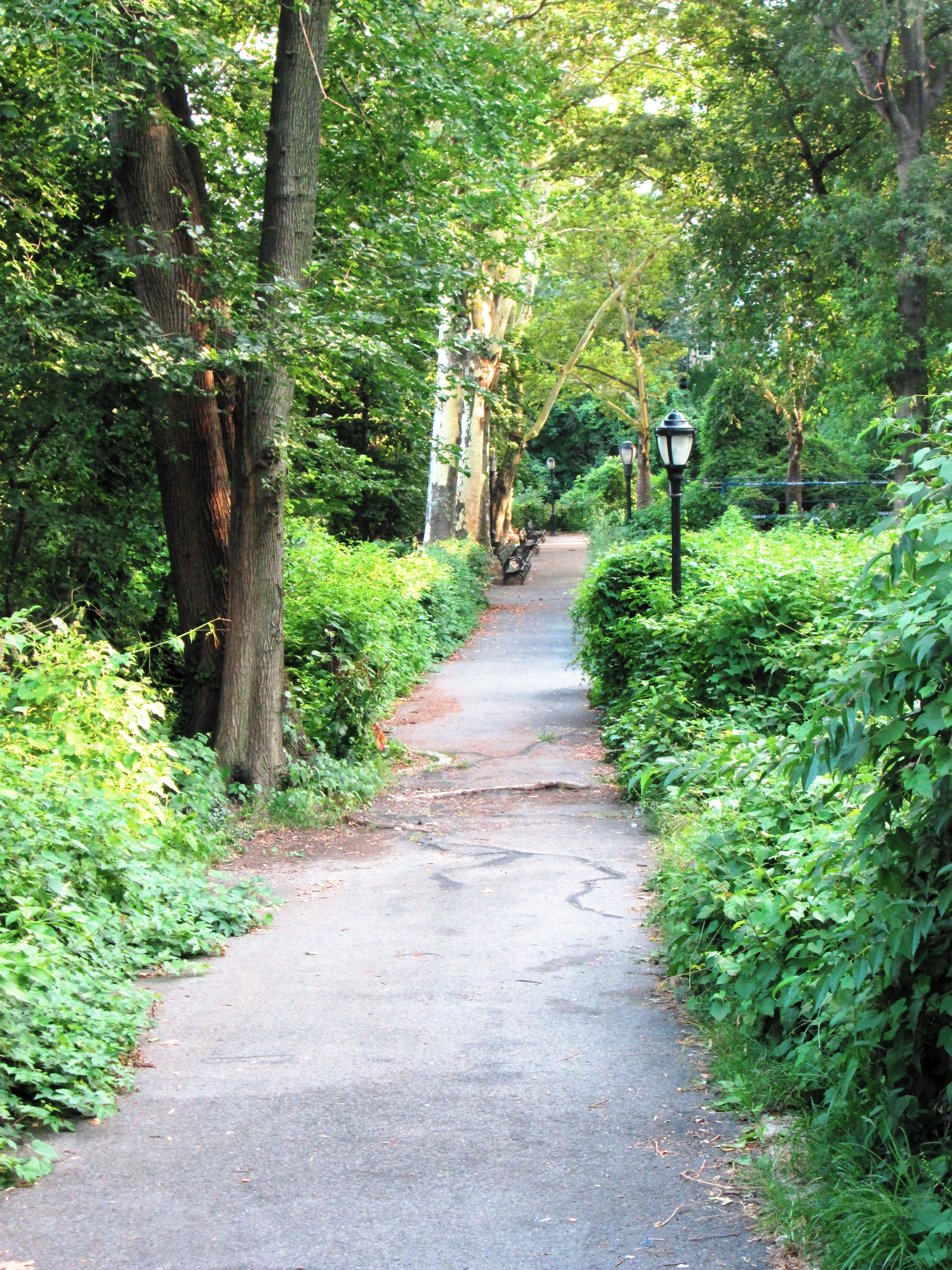
A walkway in Fort Tryon Park

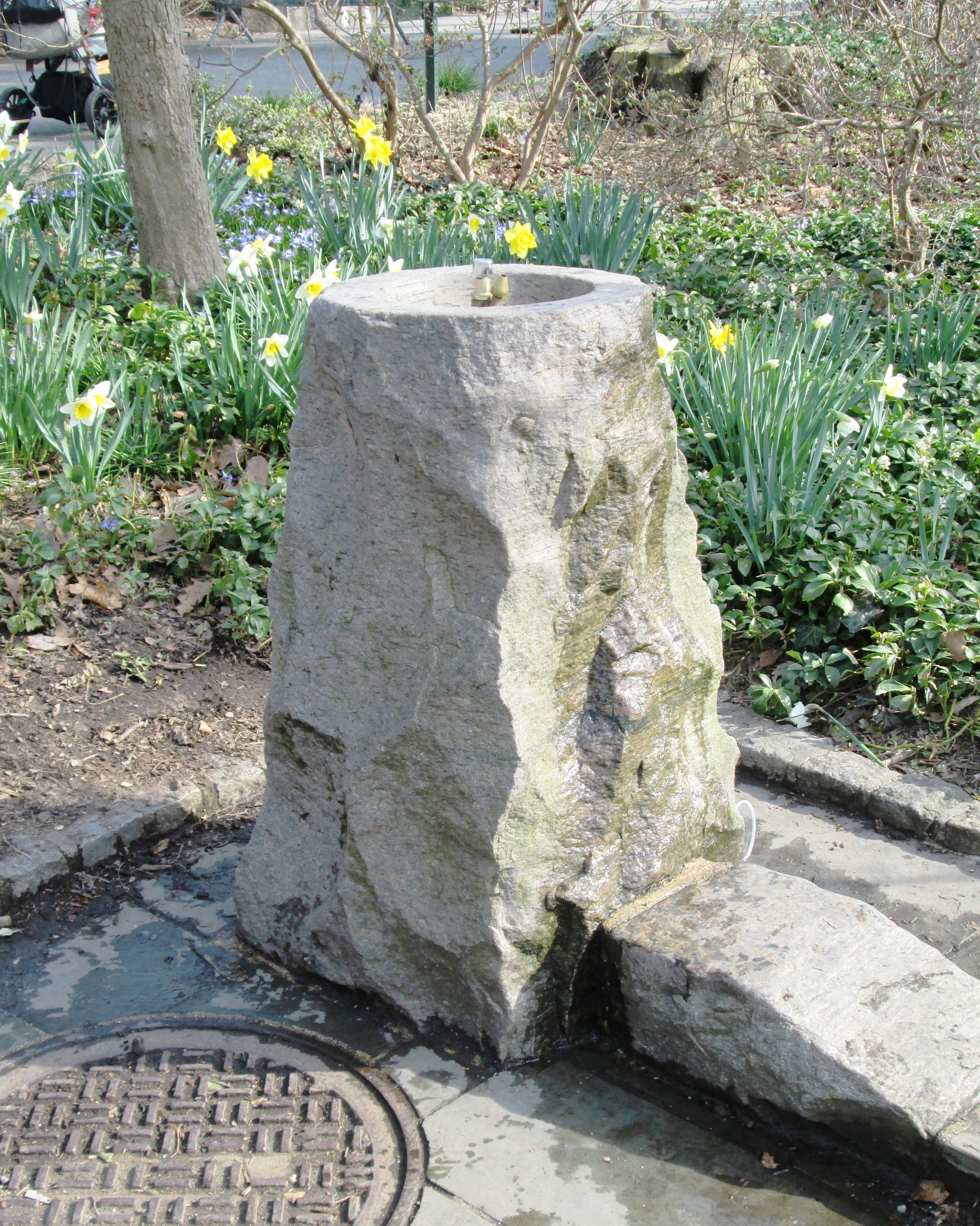
A water fountain, designed by the Olmsted Brothers

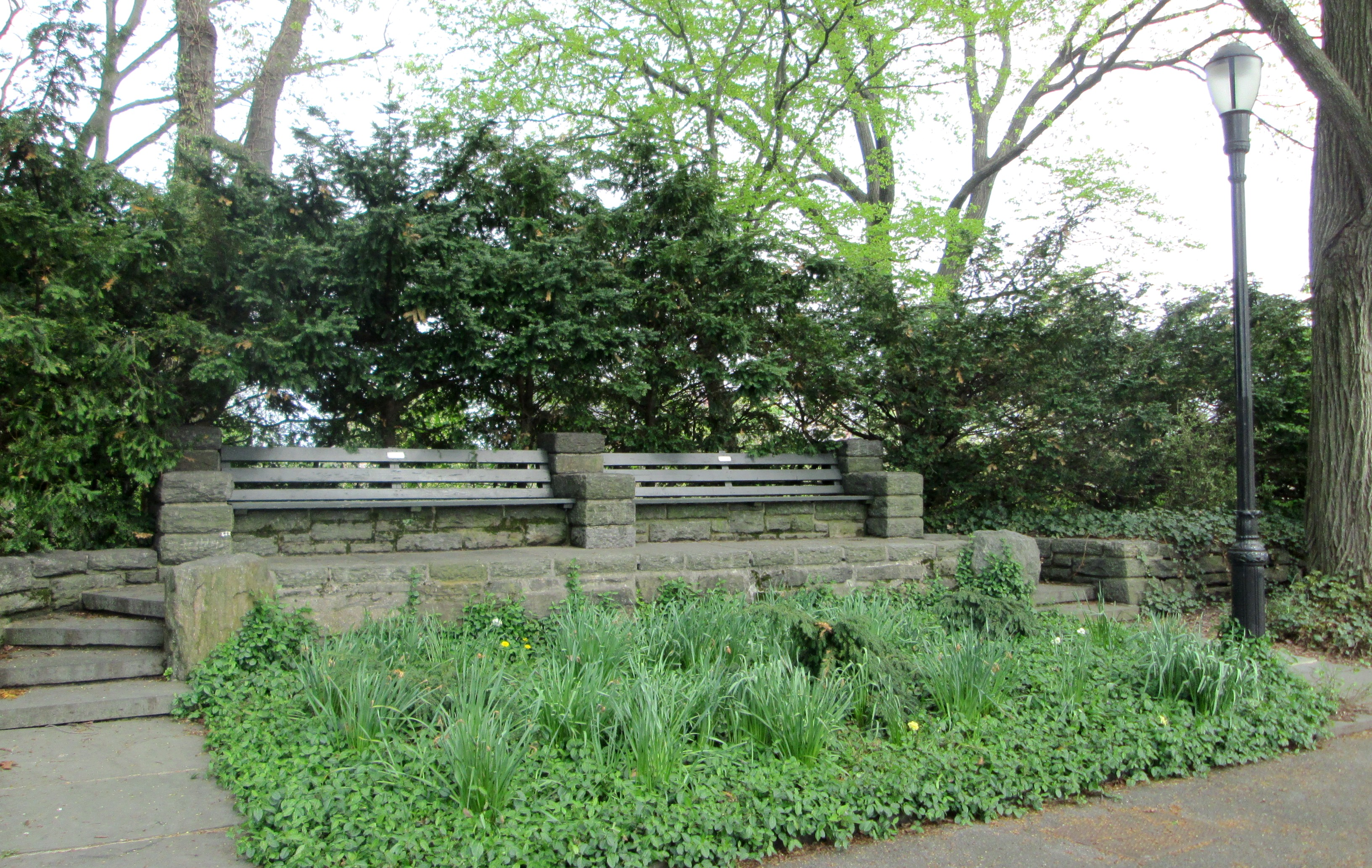
The built-in benches, part of Olmsted's original design

Olmsted Brothers created a plan that adapted the area's steep topography into a landscaped park. According to their original 1927 design, Fort Tryon Park was to be a "landscape park occupying a site of extraordinary landscape interest", devoted mostly to "passive recreation" except for a playground at its northern edge. Fort Tryon Park's landscape also served as the backdrop for the Cloisters, intended as the "culminating point of interest in the architectural design of the park." The natural topography was largely preserved, with the park being designed around the terrain. Olmsted Jr. believed that the park should use a variety of landscapes:

Each unit in this intricate series of places should offer a picture of as great perfection as can be contrived, using the same great distant views over the Hudson and over the City gain and again but framing them differently, presenting them with constantly differing types of foreground, some intricate and intimate, some grandiose and simple, some richly architectural or gardenesque, some picturesquely naturalistic; and, by way of contrast, some presenting wholly self-contained scenes.

In a continuation of his father's design philosophy, Olmsted Jr. included passive recreation features such as numerous tiers of paths; a combination of natural and manmade slopes; and the addition of plantings and rock forms to supplement existing features of the park site. The few small flat areas were converted to lawns with trees on their perimeters. Stone retaining walls were placed along slopes to prevent visitors on the paths from falling off the cliffs. The park also included curved drives and pathways for vehicles and pedestrians, as well as segregated vehicle and pedestrian uses. Other design features in Fort Tryon Park included the use of arches; segregation of passive and active recreational activities; the diversity and precise arrangement of plantings; the variety of different landscape designs; and the blend of naturalistic and architectural features. Similar design principles were also included in Morningside Park and in the Ramble at Central Park, both designed by Olmsted's father upon steep terrain.

In contrast to previous parks created by Olmsted Jr. and his father, Fort Tryon Park emphasized architecture and was more accommodating to vehicles. The park's retaining walls were more prominent than in previous parks, and the Cloisters was the most prominent feature of the park. Further, Fort Tryon Park contained parking lots and vehicle overlooks, in contrast to other parks that discouraged vehicle use. Other deviations from past designs included the emphasis of Heather Garden, a gardenesque feature, as well as the formally designed playground at the northeast corner. The design includes numerous architectural features including Corbin Circle and Linden Terrace.

=== Circulation ===
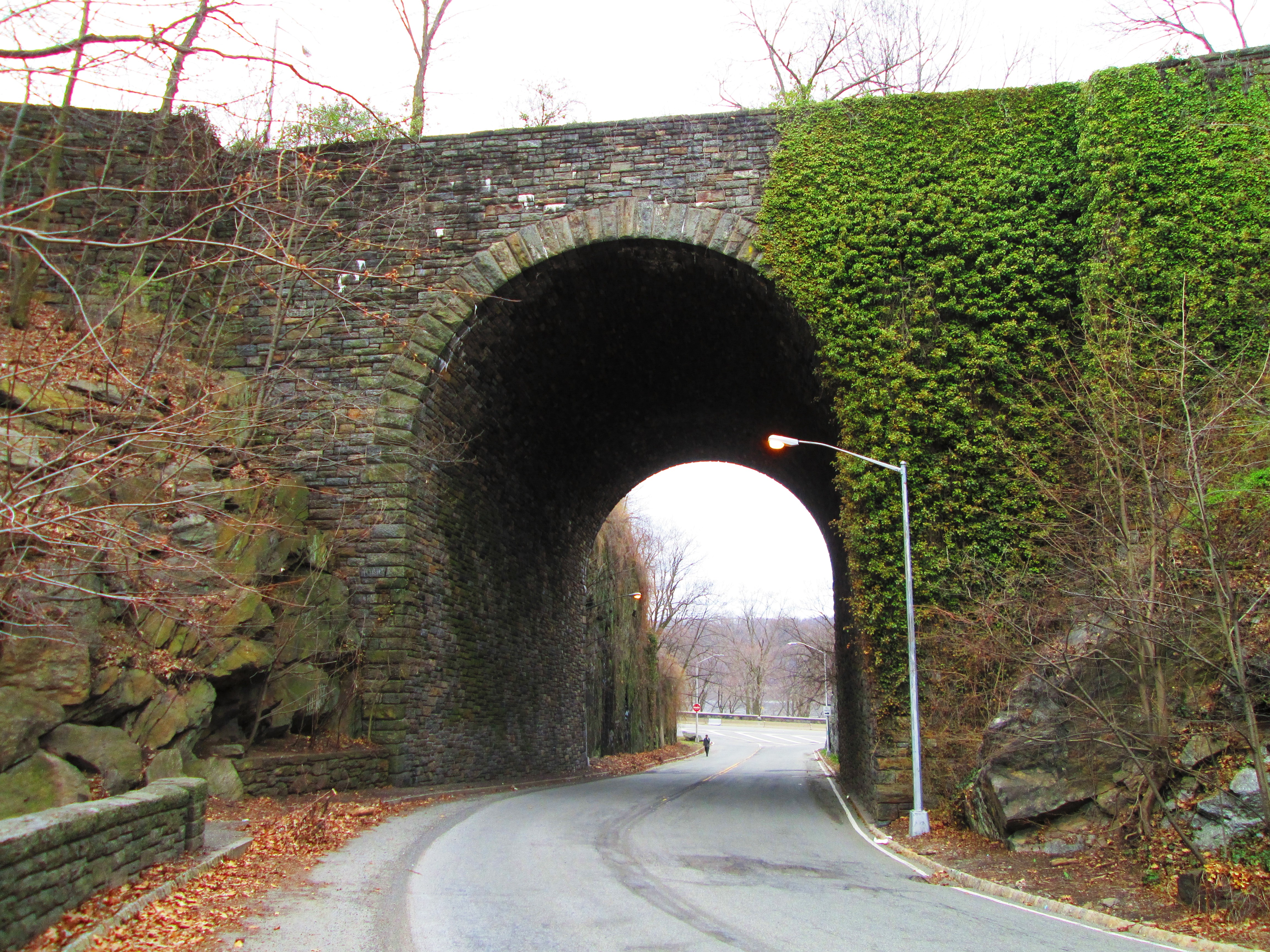
The archway under Margaret Corbin Drive, which connects to the northbound Henry Hudson Parkway

Fort Tryon Park contains numerous roads that can accommodate light traffic volumes. The primary road, named Margaret Corbin Drive, carries traffic from the park's southern entrance at Corbin Circle to a roadway that loops around the Cloisters. Formally designated in 1977, the name commemorates the Continental Army soldier in the American Revolutionary War who was wounded in the Battle of Fort Washington. A secondary roadway named Fort Tryon Place carries traffic to and from the northbound lanes of Henry Hudson Parkway, at the bottom of the cliff to the west. Corbin Drive passes above Fort Tryon Place via a pair of masonry arches: one large arch at a rock cut that carries both directions of Corbin Drive above both directions of Fort Tryon Place, and a smaller arch that carries northbound Corbin Drive over the westbound Fort Tryon Place. The drive contains numerous small parking lots.

The north–south Fort Washington Avenue ends at Corbin Circle, though it once extended north through the park. Another street, Abbey Hill Road, once connected Margaret Corbin Drive with Broadway, though it no longer exists on maps. The north–south Overlook Terrace, on the south side of the park, was authorized to be extended to Corbin Circle, though that section was not built.

An 8-mile-long (13 km) network of pedestrian pathways is also located within the park. Along the edges of some paths, there are rows of stone that have been cut and placed to produce naturalistic effects. Tunnels carry the paths under the drives at two locations: at Fort Tryon Place and near the concession building. Another bridge carries a path over Fort Tryon Place. Ramps and stairways connect the park to Broadway and Riverside Drive, respectively located at the bottom of the cliff to the east and north. A formal promenade, containing seating areas and elm trees, runs north from Corbin Circle to Linden Terrace.

=== Plantings ===
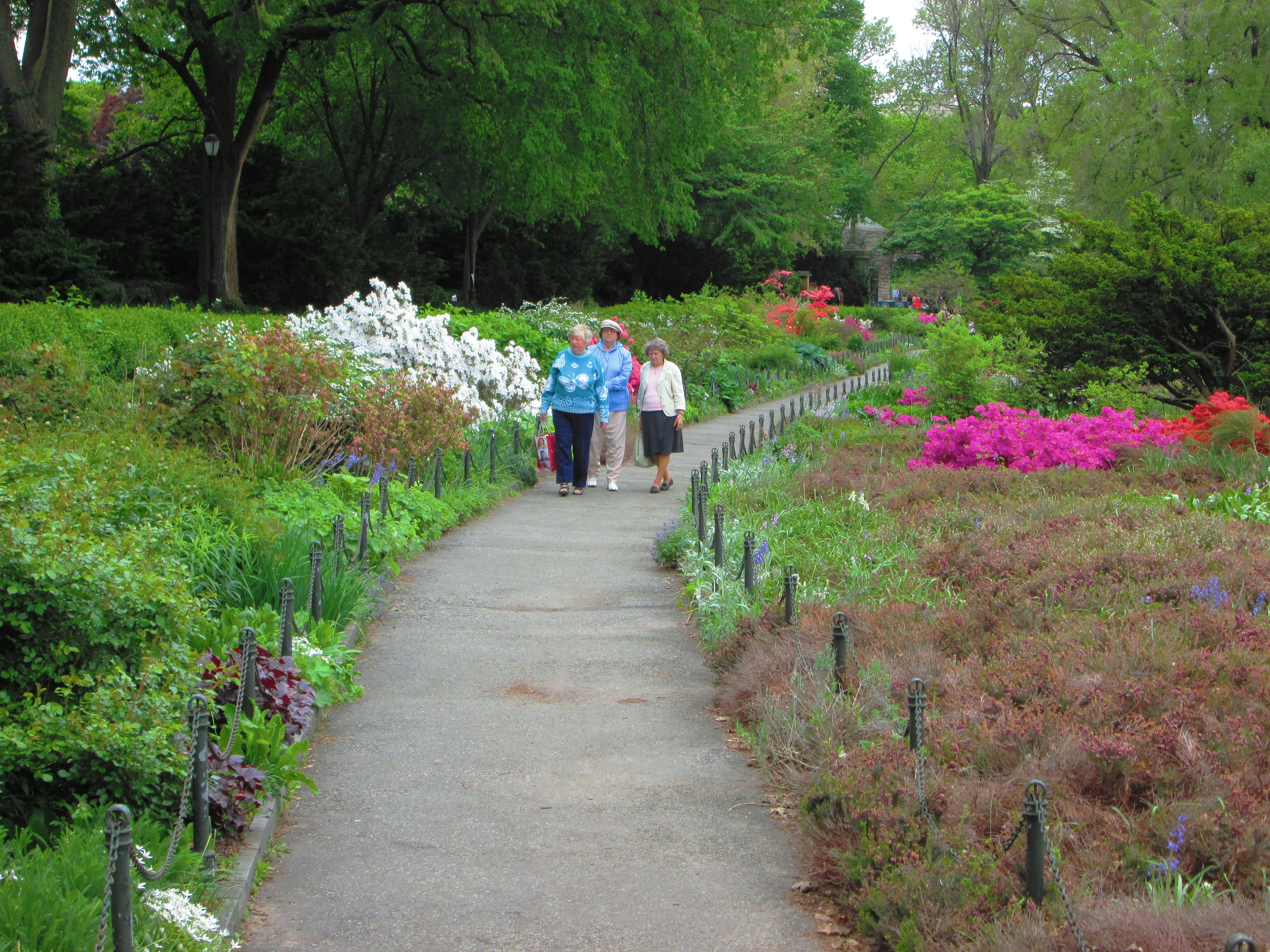
The Heather Garden contains perennials, shrubs, and trees, as well as plantings representing each season

The park site was originally planted with numerous trees, both native and imported. Olmsted Brothers transported 180 fully grown "mature trees" and planted more than 1,600 floral species to make the park appear like a botanical garden. The various sections of Fort Tryon Park were planted with herbaceous plants, shrubs, and trees representing different seasons. There were also numerous small lawns including the Children's Play Lawn and the Picnic Grounds, as well as formal planted areas such as Corbin Circle, the promenade, the terrace, and the playground. The Heather and Alpine Gardens were distinctly designed with a large variety of plantings. Though it is illegal to forage for plants inside Fort Tryon Park, or at any other public park within the city, relatively few summons are written for such violations within the park.

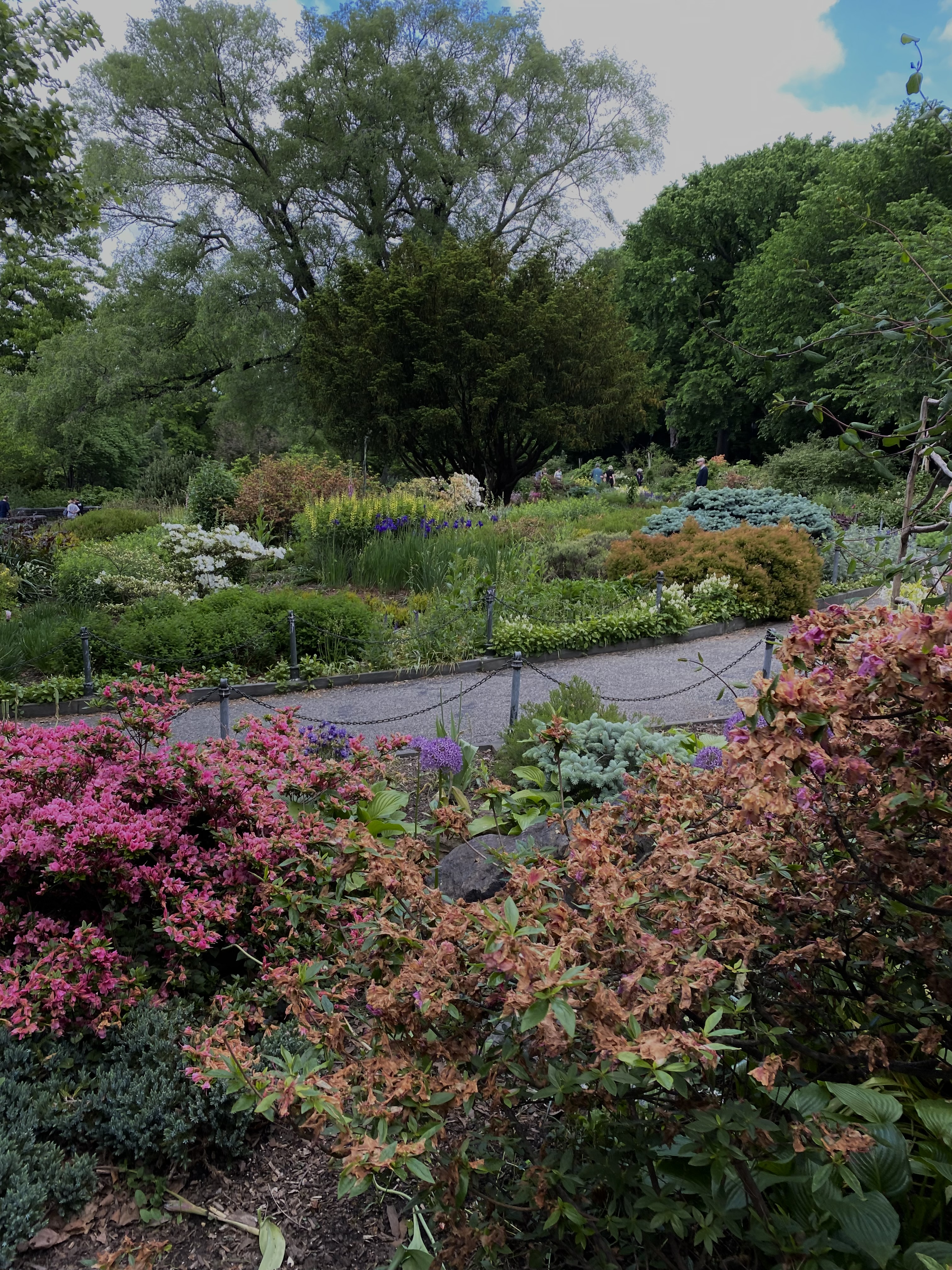
Fort Tryon Park during spring, seen in 2025

The Heather Garden, located in a ridge west of Corbin Drive and the promenade, is described by NYC Parks as "the largest public garden with unrestricted access in New York City", with an area of 3 acres (1.2 ha). It was planned by the Olmsted Brothers as a gardenesque site with American elm trees and low-growing heather, also known as Calluna vulgaris. The short height of the heather was intended to allow views of the Hudson River, and stone seating allowed visitors to observe the landscape. The heather took several years to grow to its full height. The Heather Garden became overgrown with invasive species after a remodeling in 1955 failed to take Olmsted's design into consideration. The garden was restored in the late 1980s following Olmsted's original plans. Minor additions and improvements continued to take place afterward. The garden contains perennials, shrubs, and trees, as well as plantings representing each season.

The Alpine Garden, the other formal space planned by the Olmsted Brothers, is located on the ridge along the park's eastern side, to the east of the Cloisters. It contains a stone stair and a grotto. Originally planted with alpine plants, the garden later became overgrown before being restored in 2009. The garden incorporates numerous rocks, which according to NYC Parks' website "compliment [sic] the outcroppings of metamorphic Manhattan schist". The rocks used in the garden include quartz, feldspar, mica, and garnet; some of the stone comes from excavations during the park's and subway's construction.

In addition, the Cabrini Woods Nature Sanctuary runs alongside Cabrini Boulevard at the southwestern corner of the park. The woods connect to Inwood Hill Park and Fort Washington Park, the last two natural woodlands in Manhattan. Both the woods and the boulevard are named after Frances Xavier Cabrini, the first American canonized as a Roman Catholic saint. The woods serve as a habitat for wildlife, including 80 bird species as well as possums, raccoons, and skunks.

=== Playgrounds ===
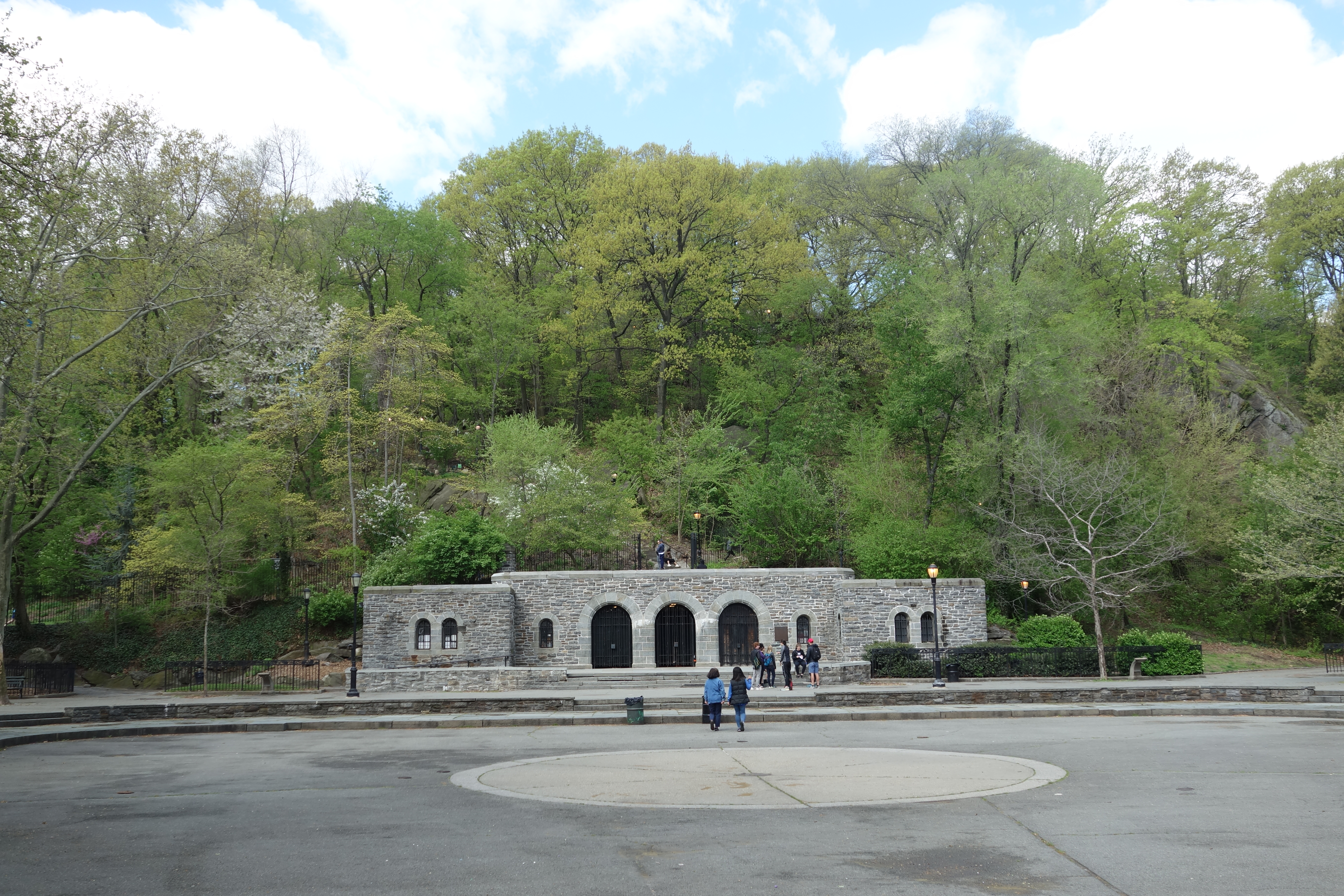
Anne Loftus Playground, the only playground designed by the Olmsted Brothers

Fort Tryon Park contains two playgrounds. The park's northeast corner contains the Anne Loftus Playground, a triangle-shaped play area that primarily serves the Inwood neighborhood to the north. It is named after Anne Susan Cahill Loftus, a local resident who was the district manager of Manhattan Community Board 12 between 1980 and 1989. Opened in 1934, the playground was the only section of Fort Tryon Park that was originally intended for "active recreation" and the only playground designed by the Olmsted Brothers. The Olmsted Brothers built the playground on the site because of its flatness and proximity to the streets nearby. The southwest side of the Anne Loftus Playground contains a one-story stone fieldhouse with a rooftop observation deck that is set into the cliff, and the northeast side contains an entrance to the Dyckman Street station. A large wading pool is located in the middle of the playground, and plane trees encircle the play area. The playground was restored in 1995–1997 under a $1.44 million project that also added handicapped-accessible facilities, additional play structures, and performance space. The Anne Loftus Playground was renovated again between 2021 and 2022.

The other playground in Fort Tryon Park is the Jacob K. Javits Playground, which primarily serves Hudson Heights and is named after U.S. senator Jacob Javits. The play area contains a play structure and basketball courts, as well as elm trees throughout the playground. When the park was created, Empire Mortgage initially leased the playground to the city before giving away the land as a gift in 1944. The playground was transferred to NYC Parks in 1981 and renamed after Javits in 1984. It was renovated in 1995. After a second period of decline, the playground was renovated again from 2018 to 2020.

=== Other features ===
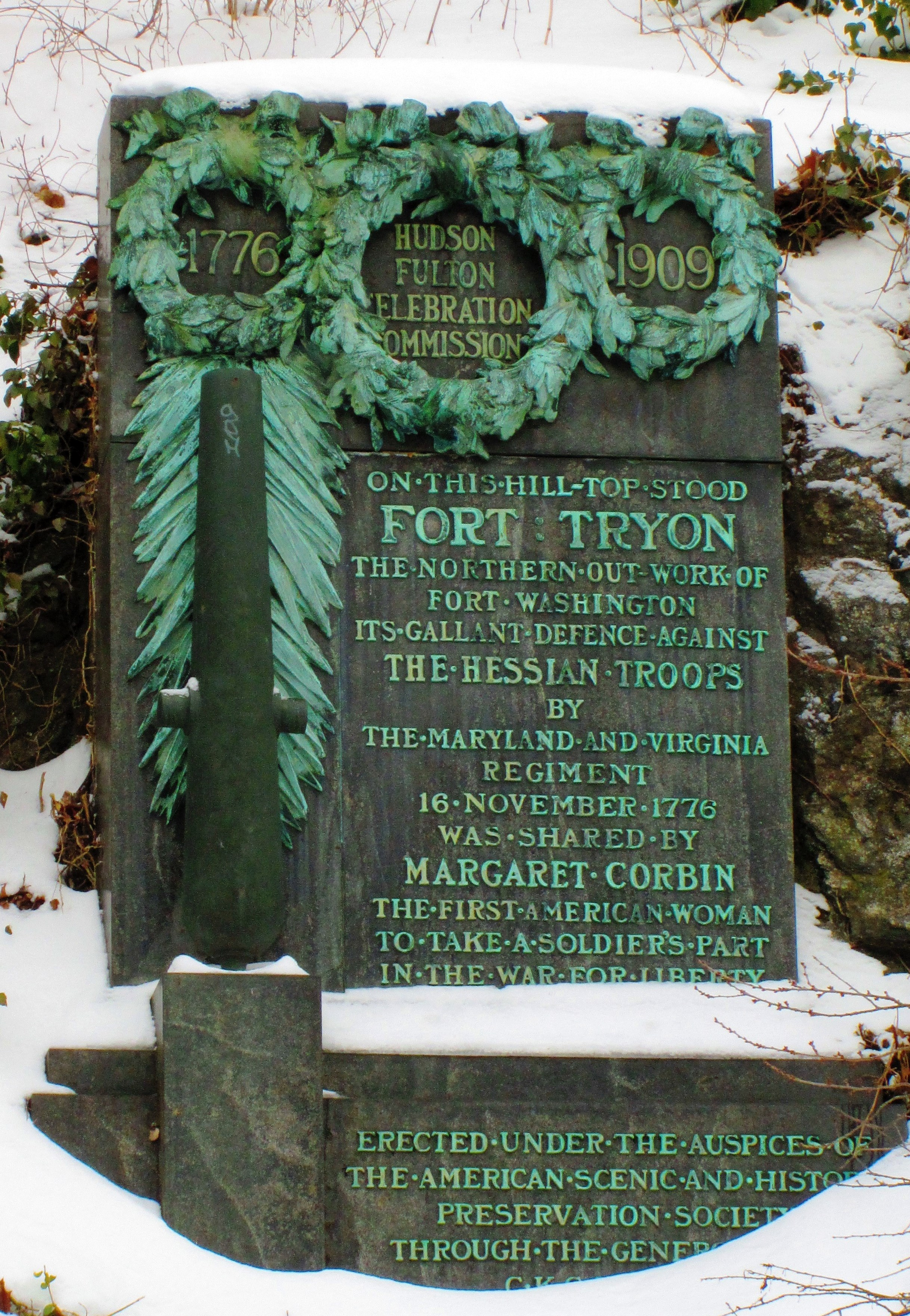
Corbin plaque

Margaret Corbin Circle is located at the intersection of Cabrini Boulevard and Fort Washington Avenue, on the park's southern border. Formerly known simply as the South Plaza, it was renamed in 1977 after Corbin. The plaza consists of a roundabout for traffic, and is surrounded by a low stone perimeter wall, with stone posts flanking the entrances to the building. A planted circle is located in the center of the roundabout. The old Fort Tryon Cottage (see § Billings estate) and the station building to the New York City Subway's 190th Street station are located on the edges of the plaza. A bronze plaque commemorating Corbin is located on the perimeter wall.

Sir William's Dog Run is located to the east of Corbin Drive, south of the overpass over Fort Tryon Drive. The dog run is open 24 hours a day and its regulations allow owners to take their dogs off-leash. Opened in 2001, it is described as the largest dog run in Manhattan. Several trees within Sir William's Dog Run are surrounded by short barriers to prevent damage to their roots.

== Structures ==
Buildings in Fort Tryon Park include the Cloisters, the gatehouse, a cafeteria and administration building, the field house, and the subway fan house and shed. Except for the Cloisters, these buildings are mostly single-story masonry structures made with ashlar. Numerous other structures also exist, including a gazebo and the Billings Arcade.

=== The Cloisters ===
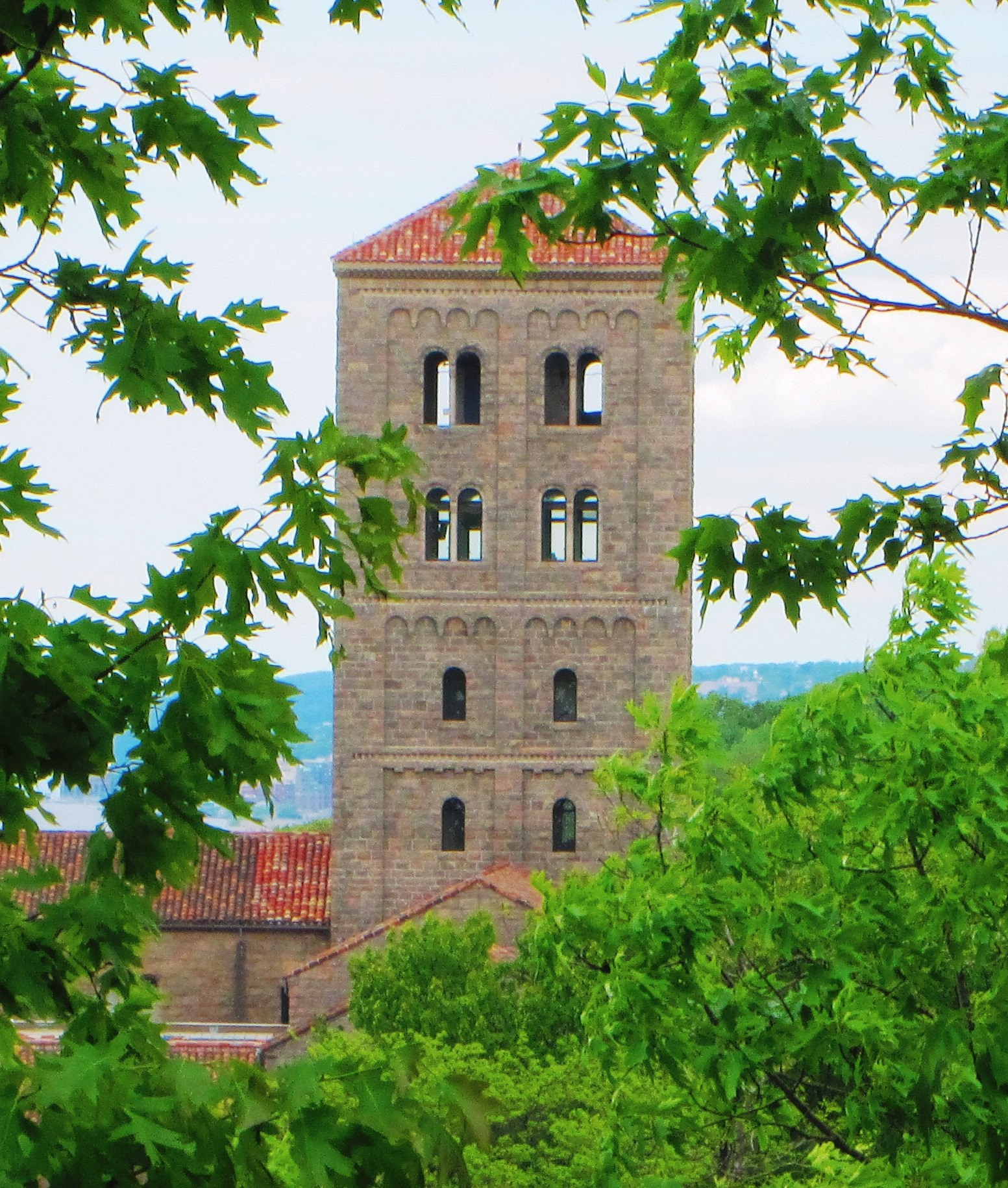
The tower of the Cloisters, as seen from Linden Terrace

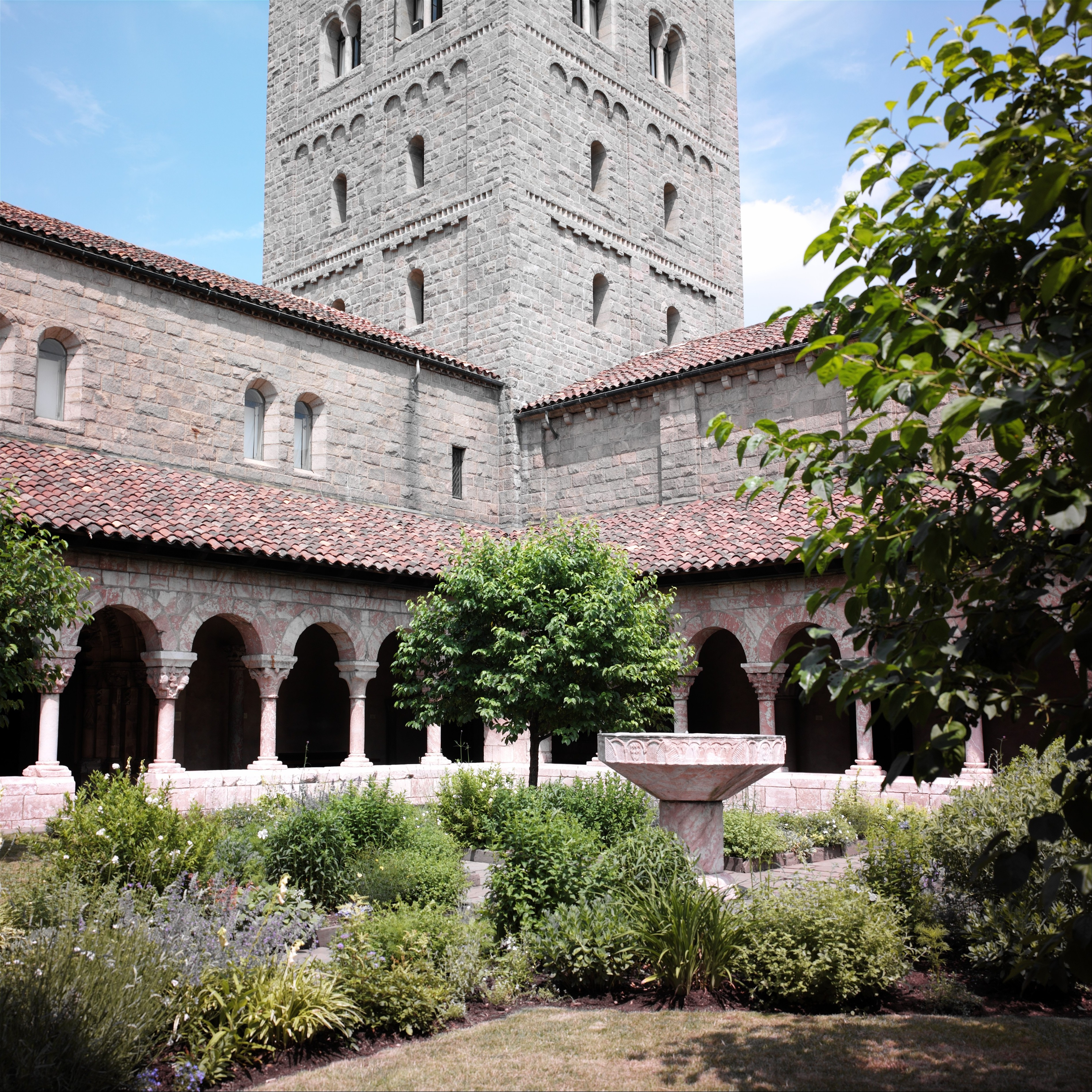
Cuxa Cloister

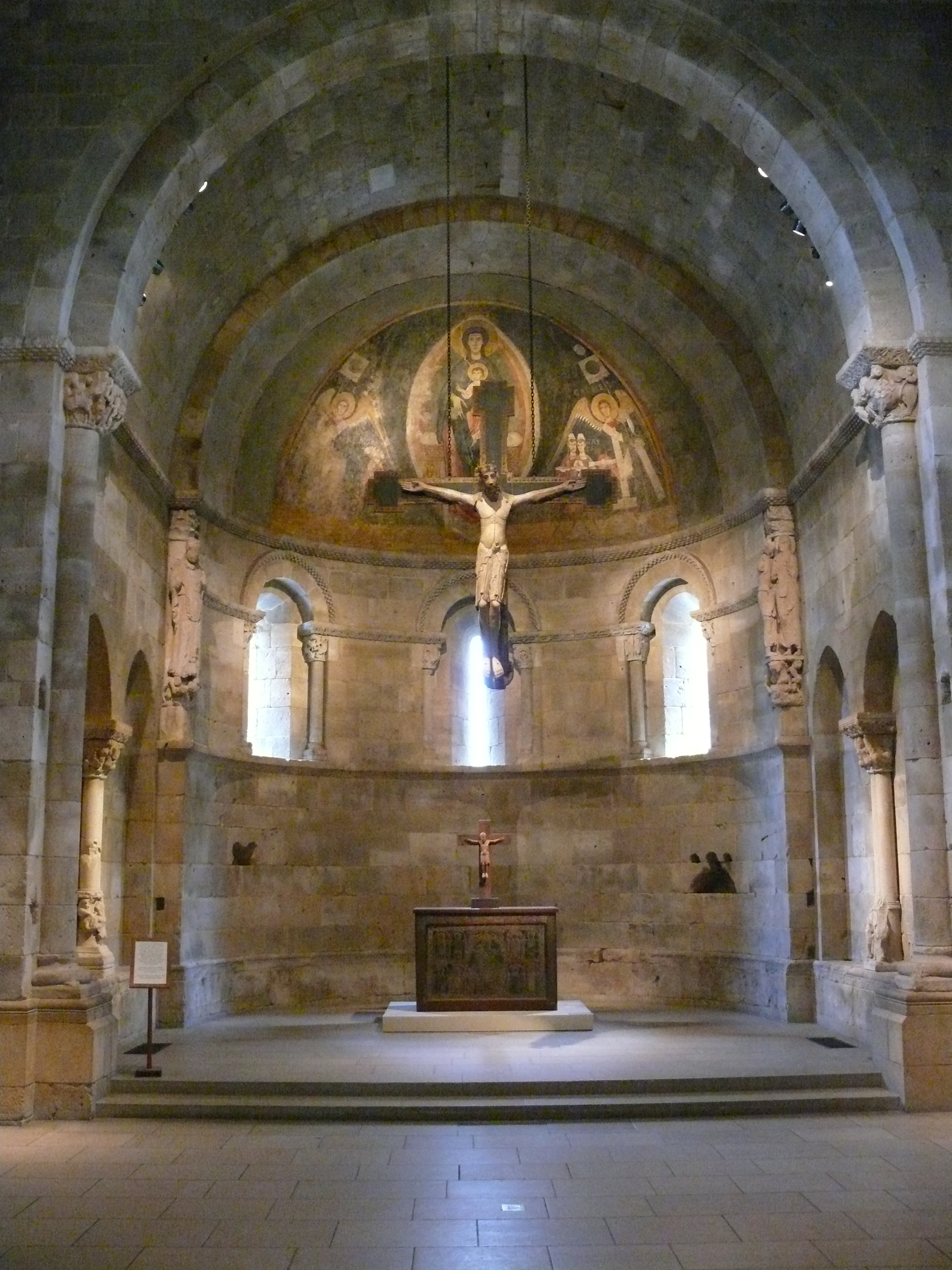
The Fuentidueña Apse

The Cloisters is a branch of the Metropolitan Museum of Art that houses the museum's extensive collection of medieval European art and artifacts, including the Unicorn Tapestries. The museum's buildings are a combination of medieval structures bought in Europe and reconstructed on-site stone-by-stone, and new buildings in the medieval style designed by Charles Collens. The Cloisters consists of four main cloister structures: Cuxa, Saint Guilhem, Bonnefont, and Trie. The Cloisters also contains three gardens, one each within the Cuxa, Bonnefont, and Trie cloisters. The museum is surrounded by the circular park drive, and its site is bounded by many plantings including an apple orchard to the south and denser vegetation to the north and west. A driveway and a bus stop with Belgian blocks is located at the northeastern portion of the site.

The museum was created after John D. Rockefeller Jr. purchased the medieval art collection of George Grey Barnard, and gave it to the Met along with his own collection. Rockefeller, retaining Bernard as an advisor, decided that Fort Tryon Park was the most suitable place for the collection. The Met then had the Cloisters built in Rockefeller's newly created Fort Tryon Park with endowment money from Rockefeller. The Cloisters opened to the public in 1938. A northern extension to the Cloisters, The Fuentidueña Apse, was completed in 1961.

=== Linden Terrace ===
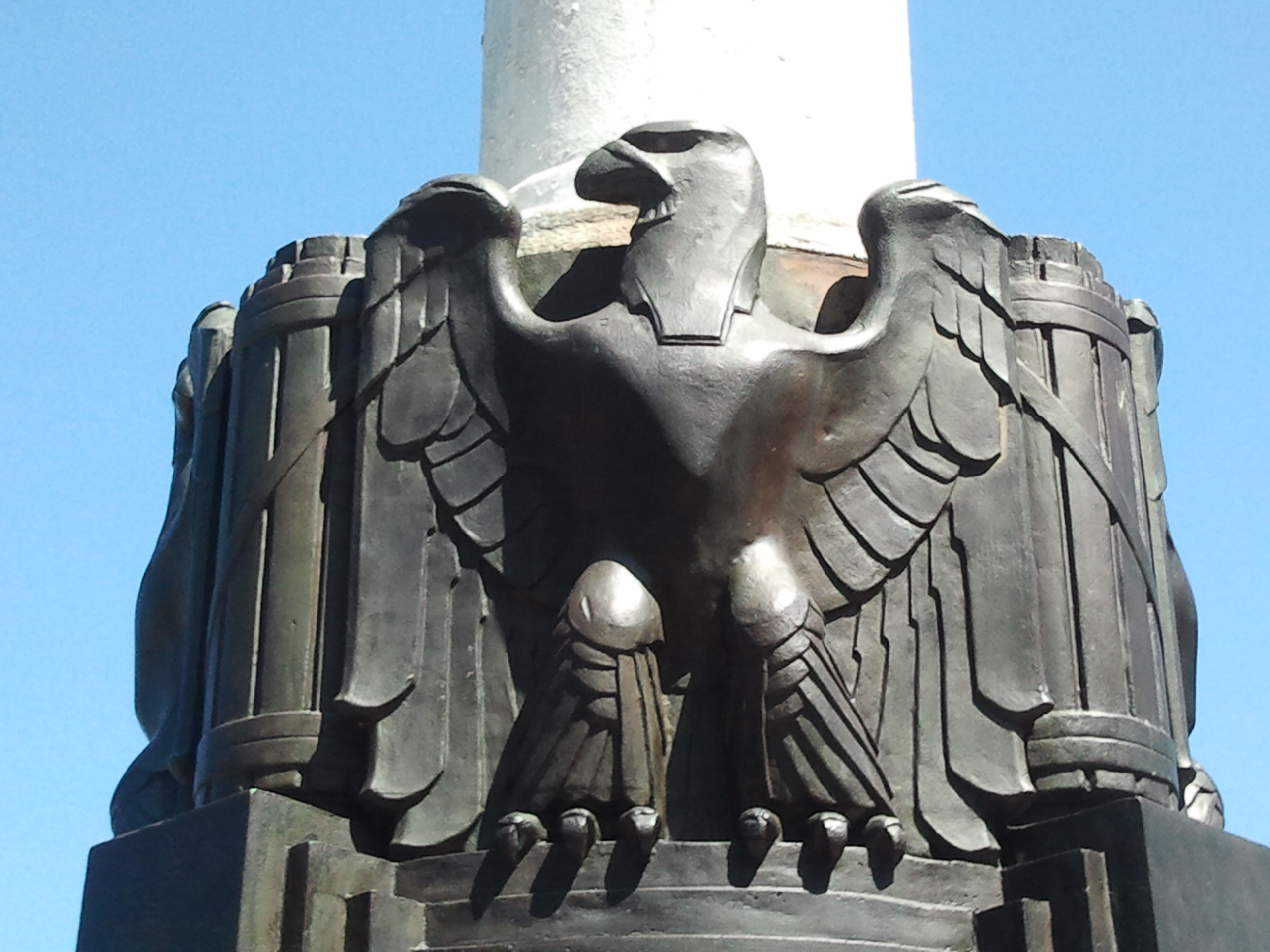
The base of the flagstaff on Linden Terrace, at the place where Fort Tryon stood

The David Rockefeller Linden Terrace is located at the Promenade's northern end, on the site of Fort Tryon and Tryon Hall. The terrace is located 268 feet (82 m) above sea level, the highest location in Fort Tryon Park. It is also the highest landscape feature on Manhattan Island, as measured by the distance between ground level and sea level. However, Linden Terrace is not the island's highest natural point, which is located within Bennett Park a few blocks south, 265 feet (81 m) above sea level. Linden Terrace is supported with stone retaining walls of up to 40 feet (12 m) tall. It comprises a main observation deck and the smaller Northeast Terrace, which are linked by an arch across a passageway below. In the early 21st century the terrace was renamed after John D. Rockefeller Jr's last surviving child David, who had donated $1 million toward the park.

The main portion contains a terraced seating area with elms. There is plaque installed in 1935 that recognizes John Rockefeller Jr's donation of the parkland, as well as another plaque installed in 2010 honoring David's donation. The Northeast Terrace, also known as Flagpole Terrace, includes a flagstaff with a granite-and-bronze pedestal. The original flagstaff installed by Olmsted was toppled during Hurricane Sandy in 2012 and was replaced with a replica.

The retaining wall north of Linden Terrace contains a stele called the Fort Tryon Memorial. The stele predates the park, having been installed in 1904 or 1909 to a design by Charles Rollinson Lamb. The monument was donated by C. K. G. Billings and the American Scenic and Historic Preservation Society. It contains an inscription commemorating Corbin's and the Maryland and Virginia regiments' defense during the battle on Forest Hill in 1776.

=== Billings estate ===
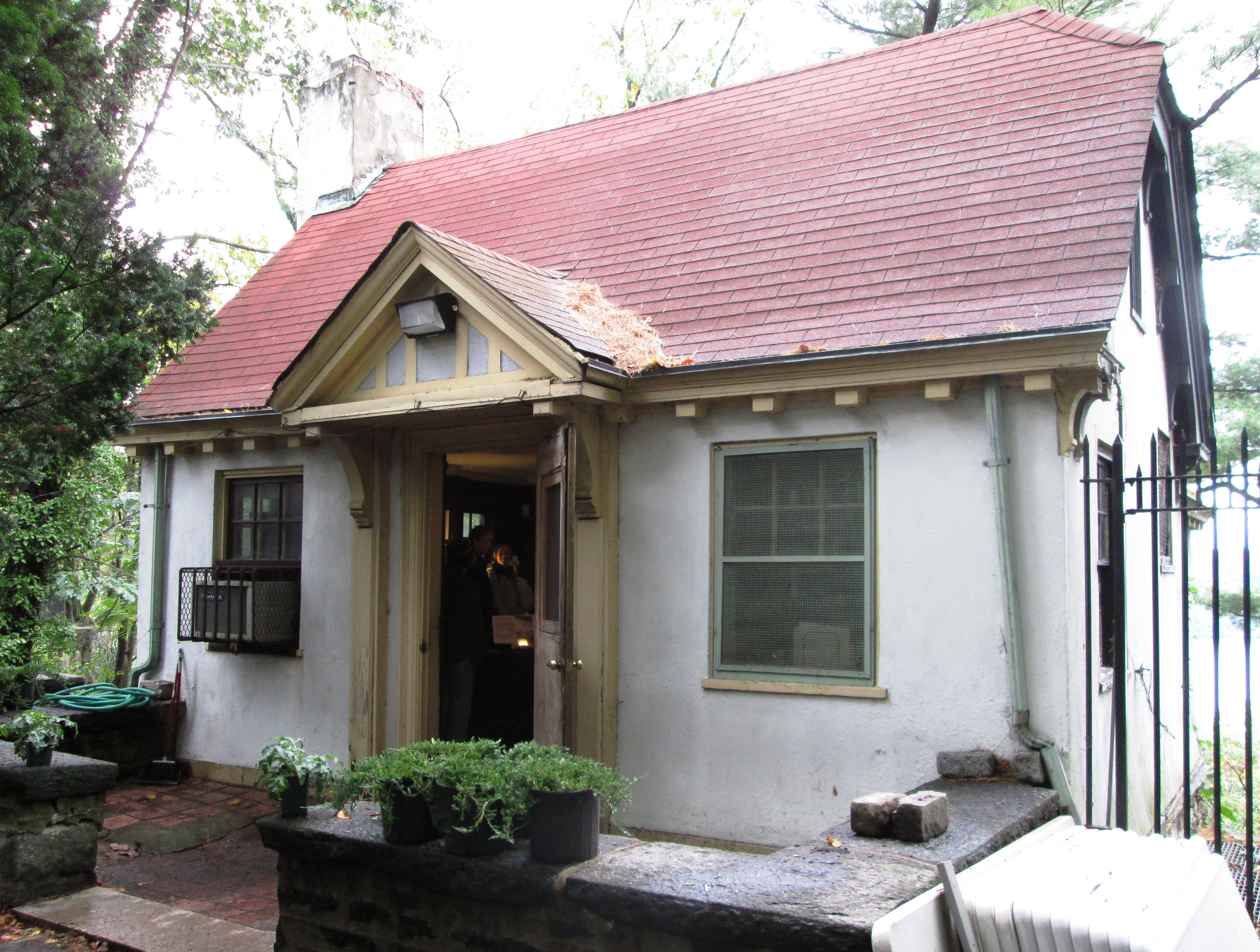
The cottage

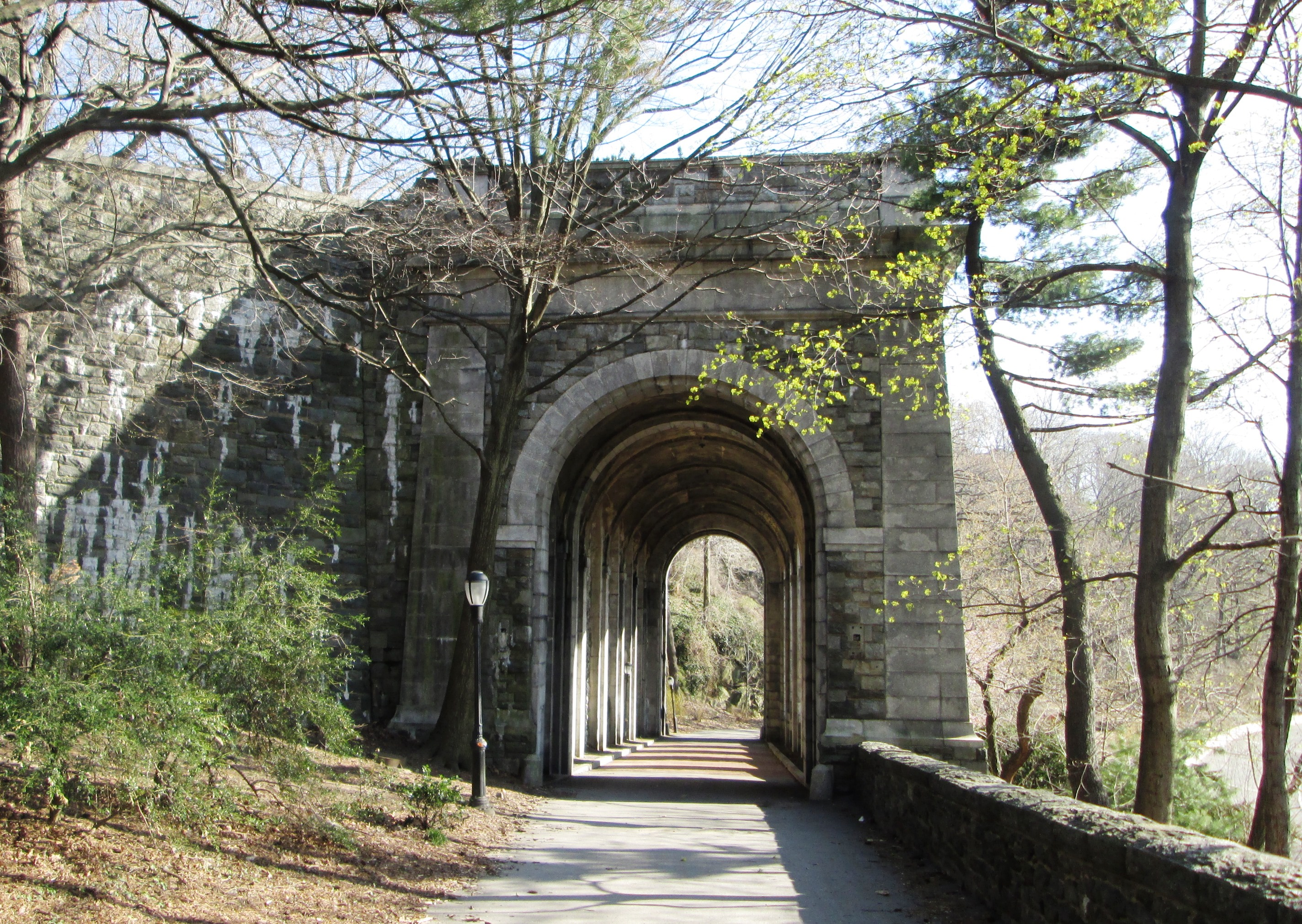
The Billings Arcade

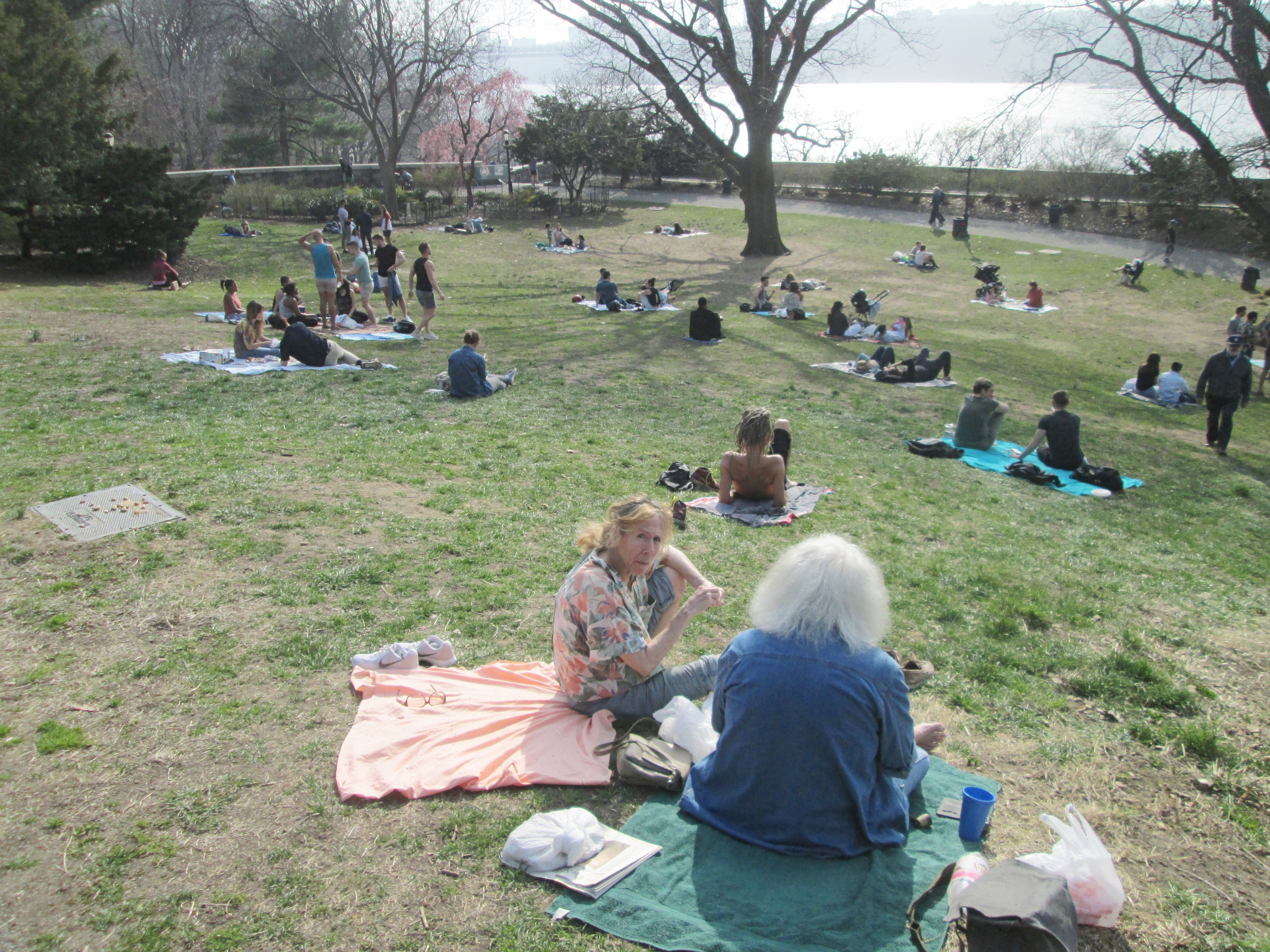
The Billings Lawn

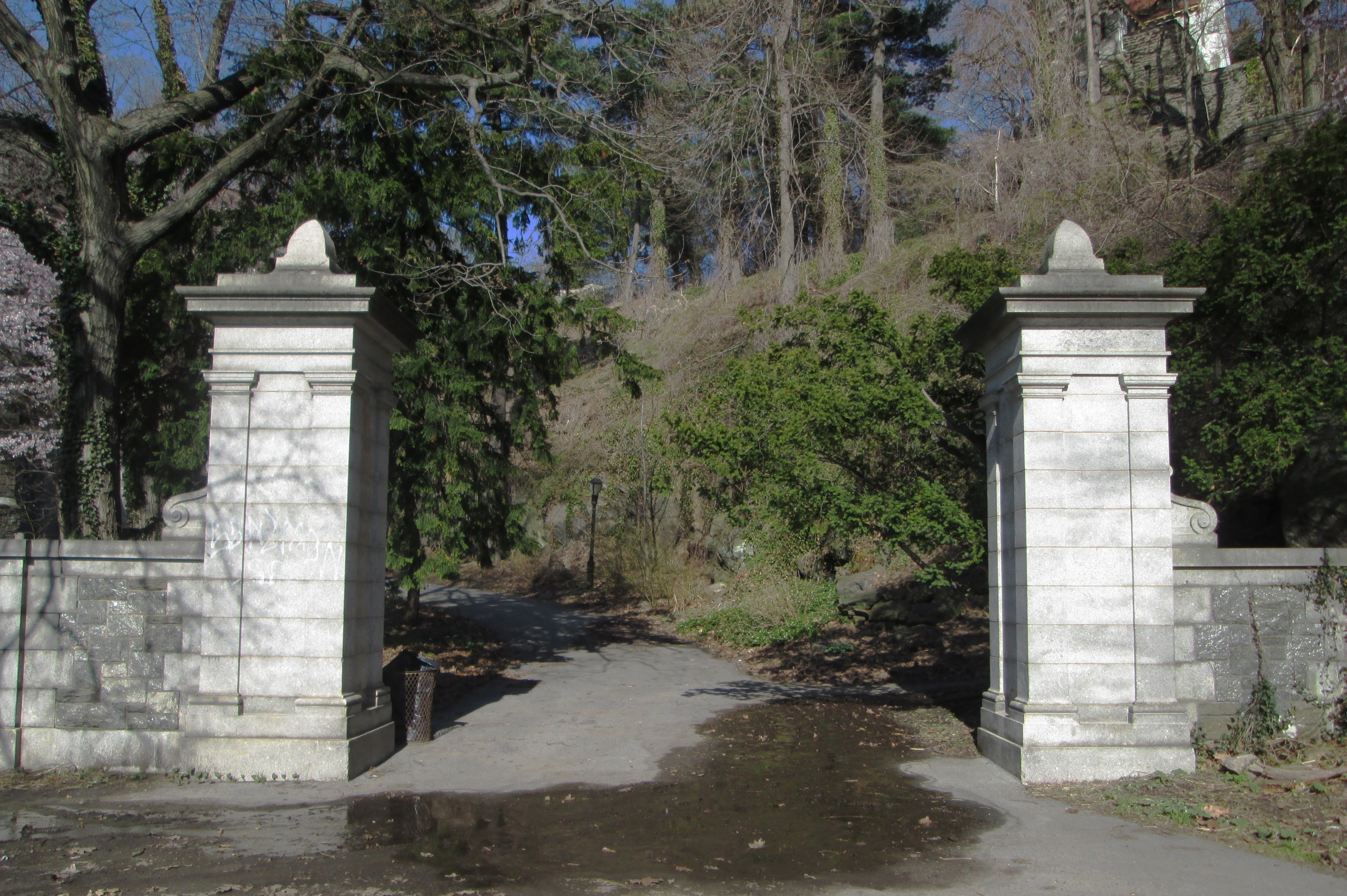
Granite posts

There are numerous remnants of the C. K. G. Billings estate. The Fort Tryon Cottage, located on a slope just northwest of Corbin Circle, was originally a gatehouse for the estate. The structure is made of frame and stucco and contains three floors with a dining room and kitchen, as well as a patio. The cottage is NYC Parks' northern Manhattan headquarters and is closed to the public except for one weekend per year.

Another extant remnant of the estate is the partially paved-over red-brick pathways near Corbin Circle. It was originally a 1,600-foot-long (490 m) serpentine driveway with multiple switchbacks that continued down to Riverside Drive, now the northbound lanes of the Henry Hudson Parkway. The brick was intended to help horses ascend the driveway's 6% slope. By 1936, when the park was built, the driveway had been converted into a pedestrian path. Though the gates to the driveway were removed, the granite posts were left standing. An overgrown section of the driveway used to connect with the northbound Henry Hudson Parkway, but in 1994, the New York State Department of Transportation added a Jersey barrier to block off access to the driveway.

The driveway continued down through the massively arched structure known as the Billings Arcade. The arcade features five 50-foot-tall (15 m) arches built of granite from Maine. Atop the arcade is a small open area known as the Billings Lawn. The arcade cost $250,000 to construct, equivalent to $8,958,000 in 2025.

=== Concession building ===
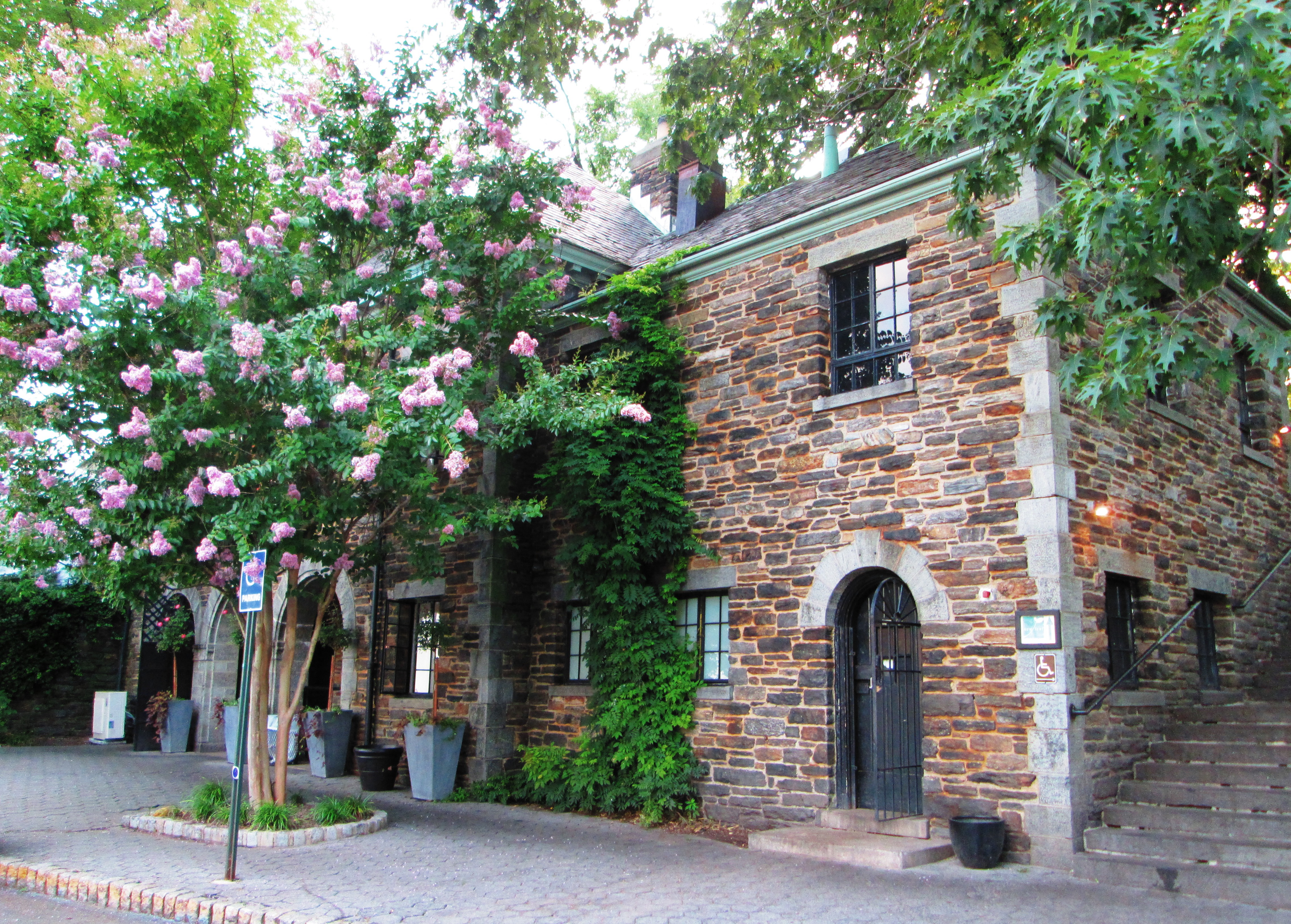
Concession building

The park's concession building is located north of Margaret Corbin Circle, on the western side of Corbin Drive. The two-story stone structure is located in a slope. It contains a hip roof made of slate and open pavilions on all sides except the southern facade. The building's main entrance is through an arcade with three arches on the eastern facade. Originally, the building contained a cafe with refreshments, as well as restrooms and the headquarters for park staff.

The building, having fallen into disrepair, was closed after a fire in 1976. It was restored beginning in 1995 by Bette Midler's nonprofit organization NYRP. The organization was awarded the operation of the concession in 2000, and opened the New Leaf Café – later called the New Leaf Restaurant and Bar – the next year. NYC Parks closed the building for necessary roof repairs in December 2014, and NYRP announced that it would not reopen, due to the length of time the repairs would take and the increased rent that the organization would have to pay. The operation of the restaurant was taken over in late April 2015 by Coffeed, a Queens-based cafe which donates a portion of its revenue to local charities. The restaurant closed again in January 2020 after Coffeed's contract expired.

=== Other structures ===
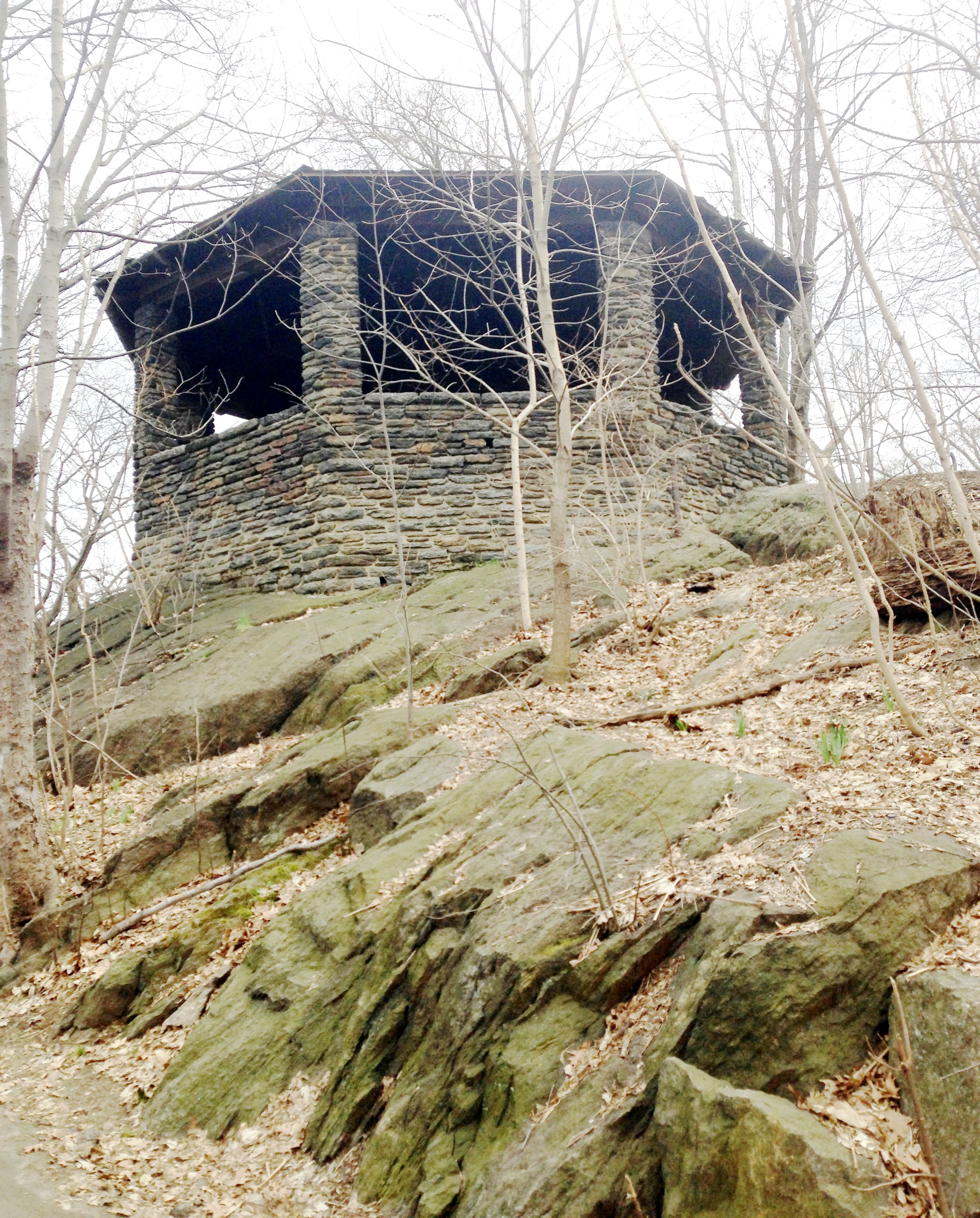
The park's gazebo, as seen from a pathway below

The Shelter Overlook, an octagonal gazebo, is located east of Corbin Drive at the northeast corner of Sir William's Dog Run. It originally contained a tile roof, later replaced with a slate roof after a fire. The roof is supported by stone piers. The gazebo is frequented by those using the dog run.

A two-story brick ventilation building for the subway is also located within the park at Broadway and Dongan Place. There are also two comfort stations in the park. The first is a structure at Broadway and Sherman Avenue that looks like a cottage, while the second is located inside a slope north of the Cloisters.

== Wildlife ==
Cabrini Woods hosts 80 bird species as well as possums, raccoons, and skunks. The surrounding area also hosts a wide variety of birds, including common species such as blue jays and cardinals; wild turkeys; and birds of prey including red-tailed hawks and owls. Animals within the area include Eastern and meadow voles, red-bellied salamanders, southern flying squirrels, opossums, white-footed deer mice, and cottontail rabbits, as well as eastern gray squirrels and raccoons.

== Management ==
The Fort Tryon Park Conservancy (formerly the Fort Tryon Park Trust) is a nonprofit organization that helps maintain and improve Fort Tryon Park. It was founded in 1998 as the Heather Garden Committee Endowment. Modeled after the Central Park Conservancy, the organization was established after talk show host Ruth Westheimer reached out to Manhattan parks commissioner Adrian Benepe, pointing out the park's dilapidated condition. Their mission statement is to "promote the restoration, preservation, and enhancement of this historic and scenic landmark for the benefit and use of the surrounding community and all New Yorkers and visitors." The trust secured numerous grants to maintain various parts of the park.

== Transportation ==
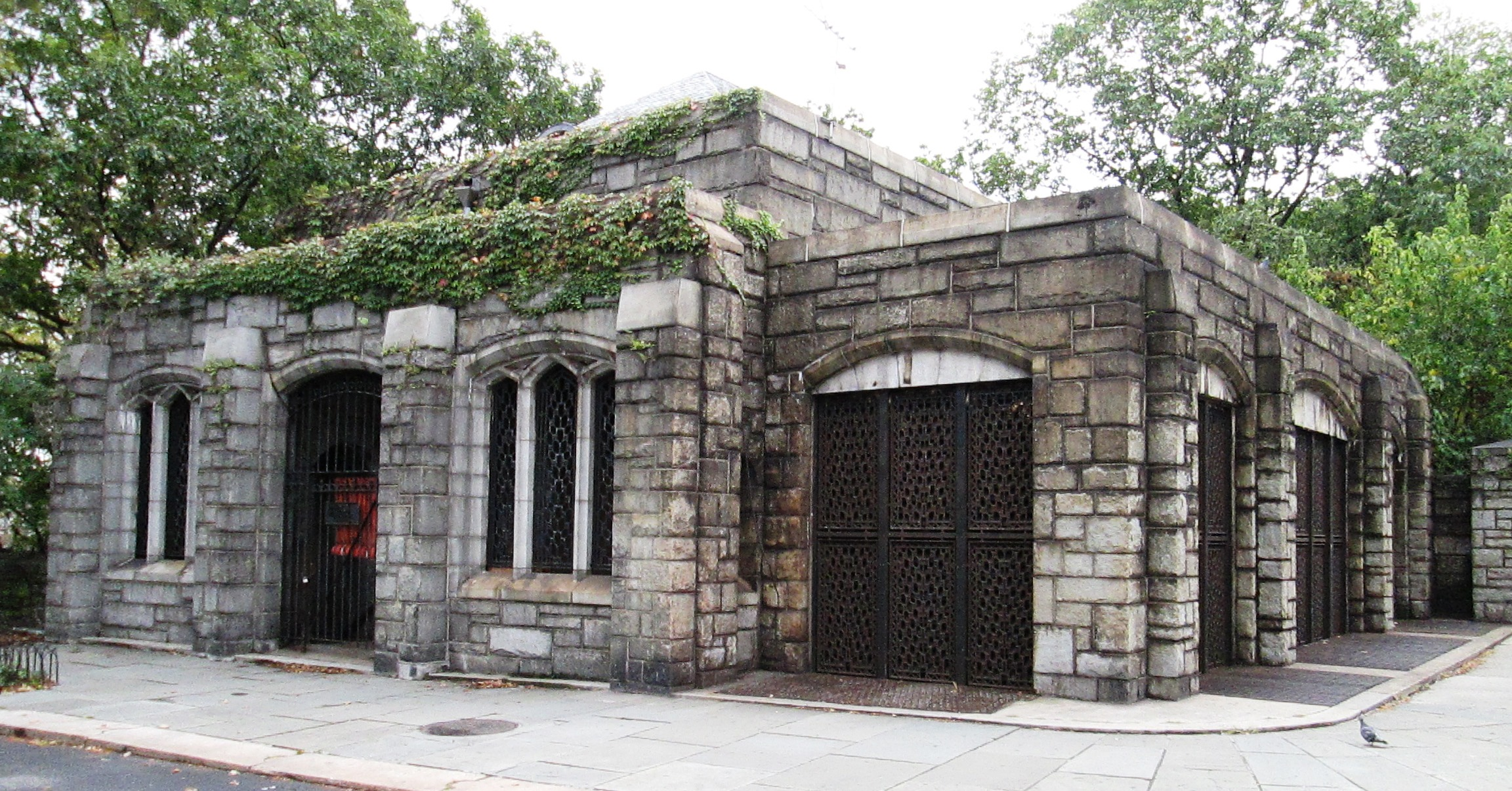
190th Street station building

The New York City Subway's IND Eighth Avenue Line (A train) runs directly underneath Fort Tryon Park. It contains two stations serving the park: the Dyckman Street station at Broadway, Riverside Drive, and Dyckman Street on the far northeast corner of the park, and the 190th Street station at Corbin Circle in the park's far southeast end.

Several bus routes serve Fort Tryon Park. The northern terminals of the M4 and M98 buses are at Corbin Circle, though the M4 bus is extended into the park to serve the Cloisters when the museum is open. Additionally, the M100 and Bx7 buses serve Broadway on the park's eastern border.

== Use and significance ==
=== Historic significance ===
There have been numerous archeological findings in Fort Tryon Park since 1918. That year, Alanson Skinner, an archeologist with the National Museum of the American Indian, discovered "traces of Indian shell heaps, fireplaces, and pits, indicating an ancient camping ground". Reginald Pelham Bolton wrote in 1924 that the intersection of 194th Street and Broadway may have been used as a seasonal camp, as evidenced by the presence of debris from the pre-colonial era underneath the overhangs in Fort Tryon Park between 194th and 198th Streets. It is unclear whether the subway excavations of the 1930s disturbed any shells or other materials, but despite the construction during that era, many materials are still buried in the ground. In the 1970s, Michael Cohn of the Brooklyn Children's Museum found oyster and clam shells as well as pottery shards and "projectile points". Other excavations have found artifacts from the 17th and 18th centuries, including war artifacts up to 10 feet (3.0 m) below ground level.

Together, the park and the Cloisters were listed as an historic district on the National Register of Historic Places in 1978. The Cloisters had been designated a New York City landmark in 1974, while Fort Tryon Park was designated a scenic landmark in 1983.

=== Public use and perception ===
In 2012, an examination of tweets and emoticons determined that Fort Tryon Park was "the happiest spot in Manhattan". Because of its secluded location, the park is frequently used for wedding photographs and ceremonies, though the park remains open to the public while these events take place. On the other hand, Fort Tryon Park has historically been used as a location for sexual intercourse due to this seclusion, and in some years, New York City Police Department officers would issue summons once a week. However, since the 2000s and 2010s, summons for public intercourse have decreased greatly.

The Fort Tryon Park Trust helps fund programs for all ages like yoga and tai chi classes, live outdoor concerts, and bird walks. The Trust also supports local artists' displays within the park, facilitated by the New York City Parks Temporary Public Art Program.

Fort Tryon Park also hosts several annual events. The Medieval Festival, an annual event that has taken place at the park since 1983, typically takes place at the end of September and draws an average of 60,000 people. Additionally, Open House New York hosts the Annual Open House New York Weekend each October, collaborating with the Fort Tryon Park Trust to give tours of the Billings cottage and the Heather Garden. Other annual events include the "Shearing of the Heather" in April, the "Urban Wildlife Festival", the remembrance of the Battle of Fort Washington in November, the Scandia Symphony concert in June, the Harvest Festival in October, and "A Toast to Fort Tryon" each summer.

=== In media ===
Several films contain footage shot in Fort Tryon Park or the Cloisters. In 1948, director Maya Deren used the Cloisters' ramparts as a backdrop for her experimental film Meditation on Violence. The same year, the film Portrait of Jennie used the Cloisters as the location for a convent school. Additionally, two scenes in the 1968 film Coogan's Bluff were filmed in Fort Tryon Park: a shoot-out at the Cloisters and a motorcycle chase in the Heather Garden. Scenes from the 2011 film The Adjustment Bureau were also filmed in Fort Tryon Park.

== See also ==
- List of New York City Designated Landmarks in Manhattan above 110th Street
- List of New York City scenic landmarks
- List of parks in New York City
- National Register of Historic Places listings in Manhattan above 110th Street
