= Dyckman Street station (IND Eighth Avenue Line) =

New York City Subway station in Manhattan

Dyckman Street
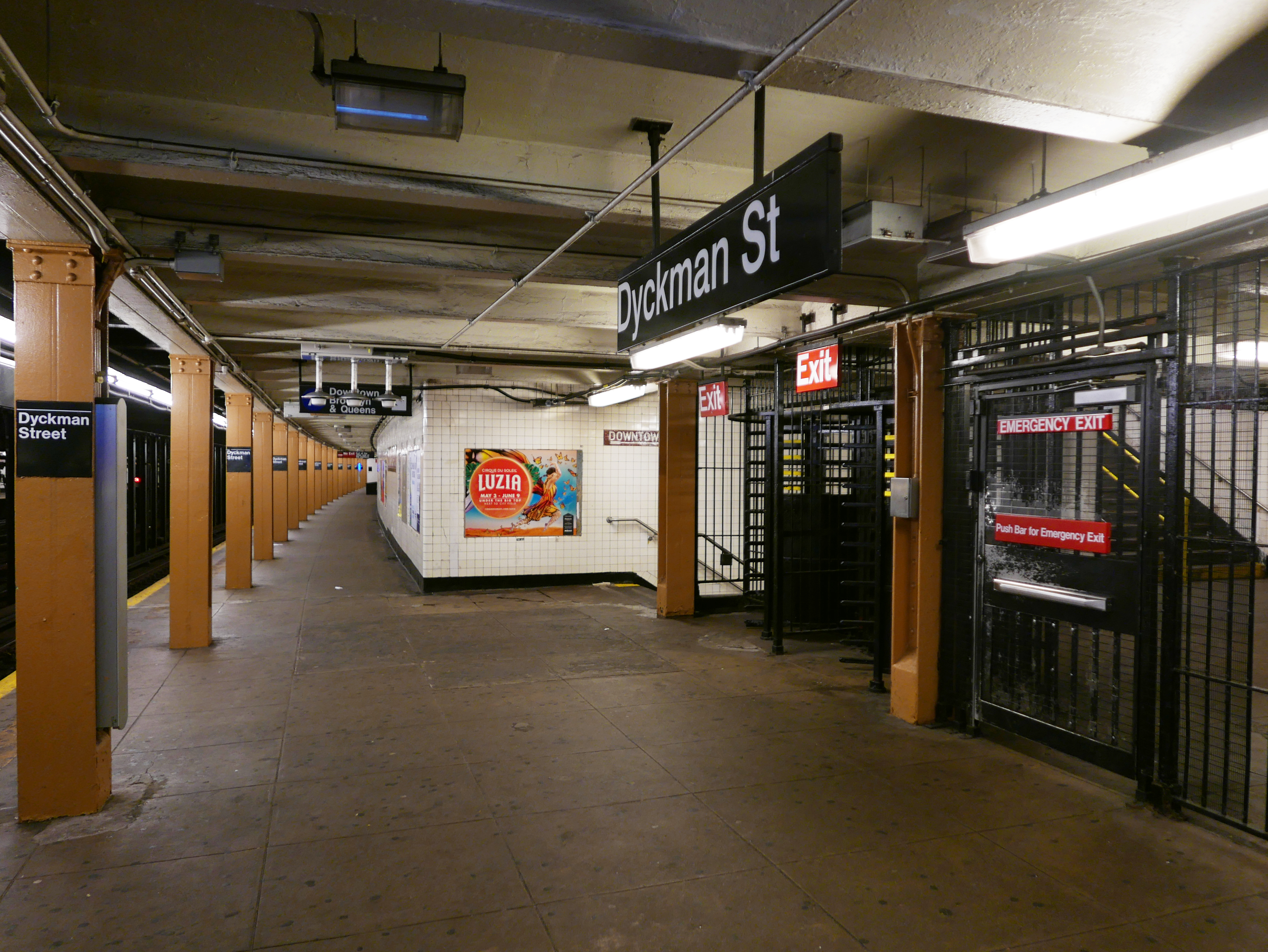
- Northbound platform

Station statistics
- Address: Dyckman Street and Broadway; New York, New York
- Borough: Manhattan
- Locale: Inwood
- Coordinates: 40.865465°N 73.927345°W
- Division: B (IND)
- Line: IND Eighth Avenue Line
- Services: A (all times)
- Transit: NYCT Bus: M100, Bx7; MTA Bus: BxM1
- Structure: Underground
- Platforms: 2 side platforms
- Tracks: 4 (2 in passenger service)

Other information
- Opened: September 10, 1932; 94 years ago
- Former/other names: Dyckman Street–200th Street
- Other entrances/ exits: Broadway, Riverside Drive, and Dyckman Street

Traffic
- 2025: 1,474,525 ▲3.9%
- Rank: 230 out of 423
Services
| Preceding station | New York City Subway | Following station |
|---|---|---|
| Inwood–207th Street Terminus | A (New York City Subway service) | 190th Street toward Far Rockaway–Mott Avenue or Ozone Park–Lefferts Boulevard |
Location
Location within New York City Subway
Location within New York City
Location within New York
Track layout
Street map
Station service legend
| Symbol | Description |
| Stops all times | Stops all times |

The Dyckman (pronounced DIKE-man) Street station (signed as Dyckman–200th Street) is a station on the IND Eighth Avenue Line of the New York City Subway, located at the intersection of Dyckman Street and Broadway in Inwood, within northern Manhattan. It is served by the A train at all times.

== History ==
New York City mayor John Francis Hylan's original plans for the Independent Subway System (IND), proposed in 1922, included building over 100 miles (160 km) of new lines and taking over nearly 100 miles (160 km) of existing lines. The lines were designed to compete with the existing underground, surface, and elevated lines operated by the Interborough Rapid Transit Company (IRT) and BMT. On December 9, 1924, the New York City Board of Transportation (BOT) gave preliminary approval for the construction of the IND Eighth Avenue Line. This line consisted of a corridor connecting Inwood, Manhattan, to Downtown Brooklyn, running largely under Eighth Avenue but also paralleling Greenwich Avenue and Sixth Avenue in Lower Manhattan. The BOT announced a list of stations on the new line in February 1928, with a station at Thayer Street (one block southwest of Dyckman Street).

The finishes at the five stations between 175th and 207th Street, including the Dyckman Street station, were 18 percent completed by May 1930. By that August, the BOT reported that the Eighth Avenue Line was nearly completed and that the stations from 116th to 207th Street were 99.9 percent completed. The entire line was completed by September 1931, except for the installation of turnstiles. A preview event for the new subway was hosted on September 8, 1932, two days before the official opening. The Dyckman Street station opened on September 10, 1932, as part of the city-operated IND's initial segment, the Eighth Avenue Line between Chambers Street and 207th Street. Construction of the whole line cost $191.2 million. Service at this station was provided with express service from its onset.

Dyckman Street was formerly named Dyckman Street–200th Street despite Manhattan never having a street numbered 200th.

The station was planned to be rehabilitated as part of the 2015–2019 MTA Capital Program.

== Station layout ==
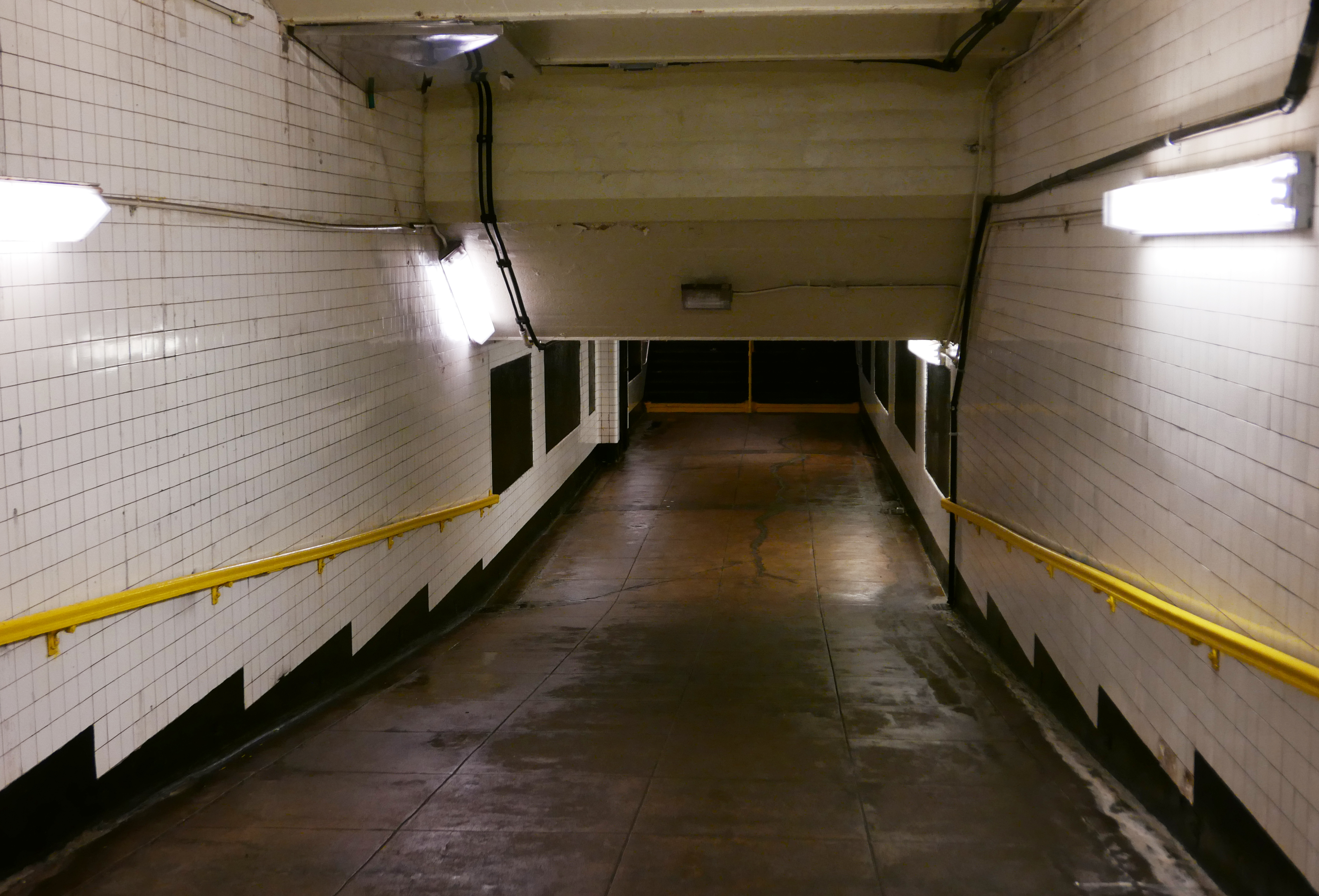
Station underpass

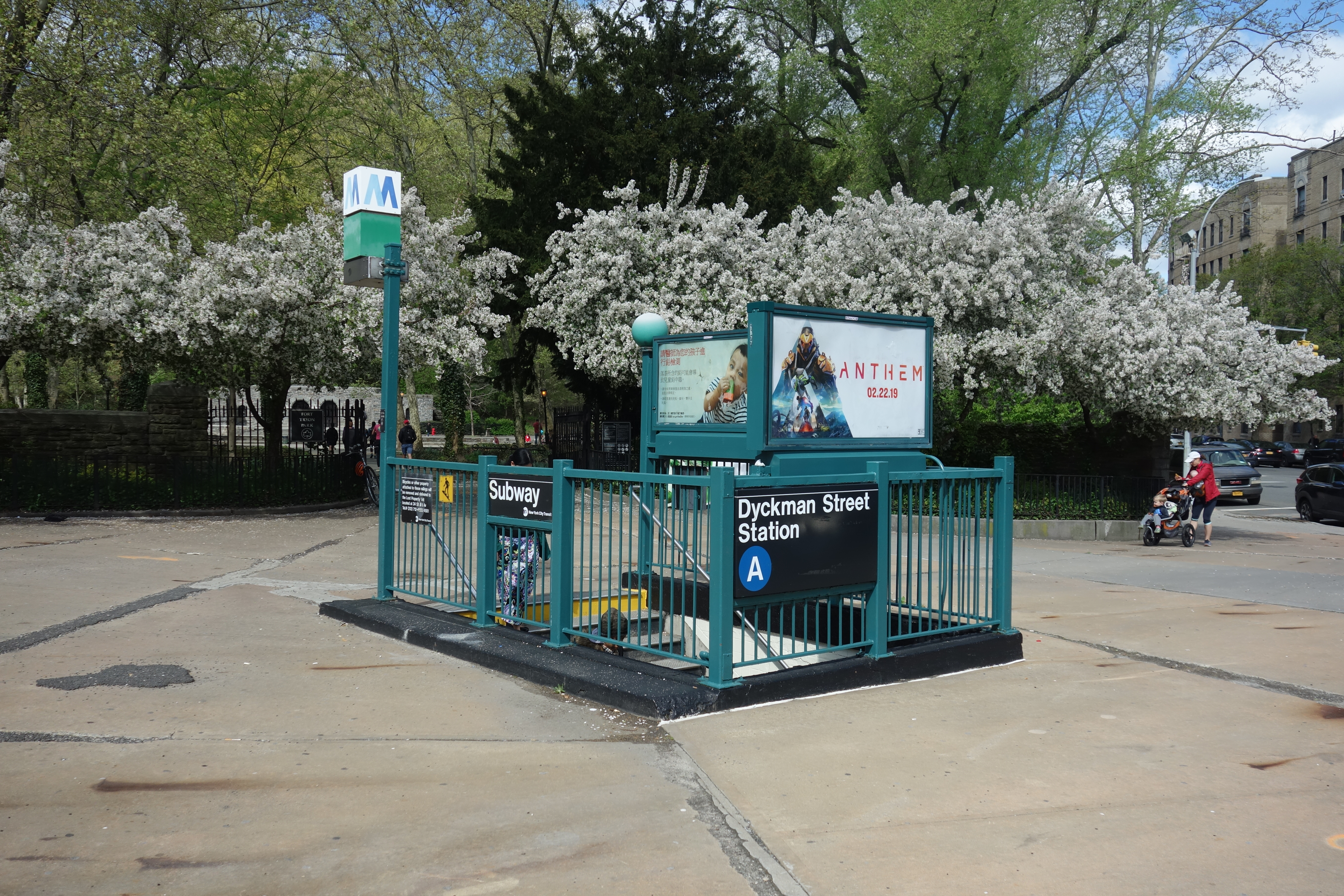
Entrance in front of Fort Tryon Park

There are four tracks and two side platforms serving only the outermost two tracks, much like a typical local station in the subway system. The station is served at all times by the A train, which uses the outermost tracks; the two innermost tracks are mostly used for train storage during off-peak hours. The next stop to the north is Inwood–207th Street, the last stop on the line, while the next stop to the south is 190th Street. North of the station, the two outer tracks lead to the 207th Street terminal station while the two center tracks lead to the 207th Street Yard; additionally, there are diamond crossovers between all four tracks before the two center tracks dive down to a lower level and turn sharply east towards the yard. South of the station is a diamond crossover between the two center tracks before they merge with the two outer tracks. During rush hours, some A trains originate and terminate here and use the switches north of the station heading to and from the yard.

Both platform walls have no trim line, but there are mosaic name tablets reading "DYCKMAN–200TH ST." in white sans-serif lettering on a maroon background and black border. Small "200" tile captions in white numbering on a black background run along the walls between the name tablets. Yellow I-beam columns run along both platforms at regular intervals, alternating ones having the standard black station name plate in white lettering, reading "Dyckman Street". A few column signs still read "200". There is an underpass connecting the platforms.

=== Exits ===
Each platform has one same-level fare control area and there is a crossunder inside fare control. The southbound platform has the full-time turnstile bank and token booth. There are three street stairs here, two of which are built inside buildings and go up to the northwest corner of Broadway and Dyckman Street. The other stair goes up to the southwest corner of Broadway and Riverside Drive on the northern end of Fort Tryon Park.

Since Inwood–207th Street is the next and last stop on the line, this station's fare control on the northbound platform is exit only, containing just full height turnstiles and four staircases, two of which go up to the northeast corner of Broadway and Dyckman Street and the other two to the southeast corner.

== Nearby points of interest ==
- Dyckman Farmhouse Museum
- Fort Tryon Park
- Inwood Hill Park
