= Paterno =

Paterno may refer to:

== Places ==
- Paterno, Basilicata, Italy
- Paternò, Catania, Sicily, Italy
- Paterno Calabro, Cosenza, Calabria, Italy
- The Paterno, a Manhattan apartment building
- Monte Paterno, a mountain
- Paterno Castle, in Albaladejo, Spain
- Paterno Castle, a ruin in Civita Castellana, Italy, death place of Otto III, Holy Roman Emperor
- Paterno Castle (New York City), a former castle in upper Manhattan

== People ==
- Paterno (surname)

== Other ==
- A.S.D. Paternò 1908, Italian football club
- Paterno (film), a 2018 film about the American football coach
