= Paterno Castle =

Spanish castle

- Castillo de Paterno
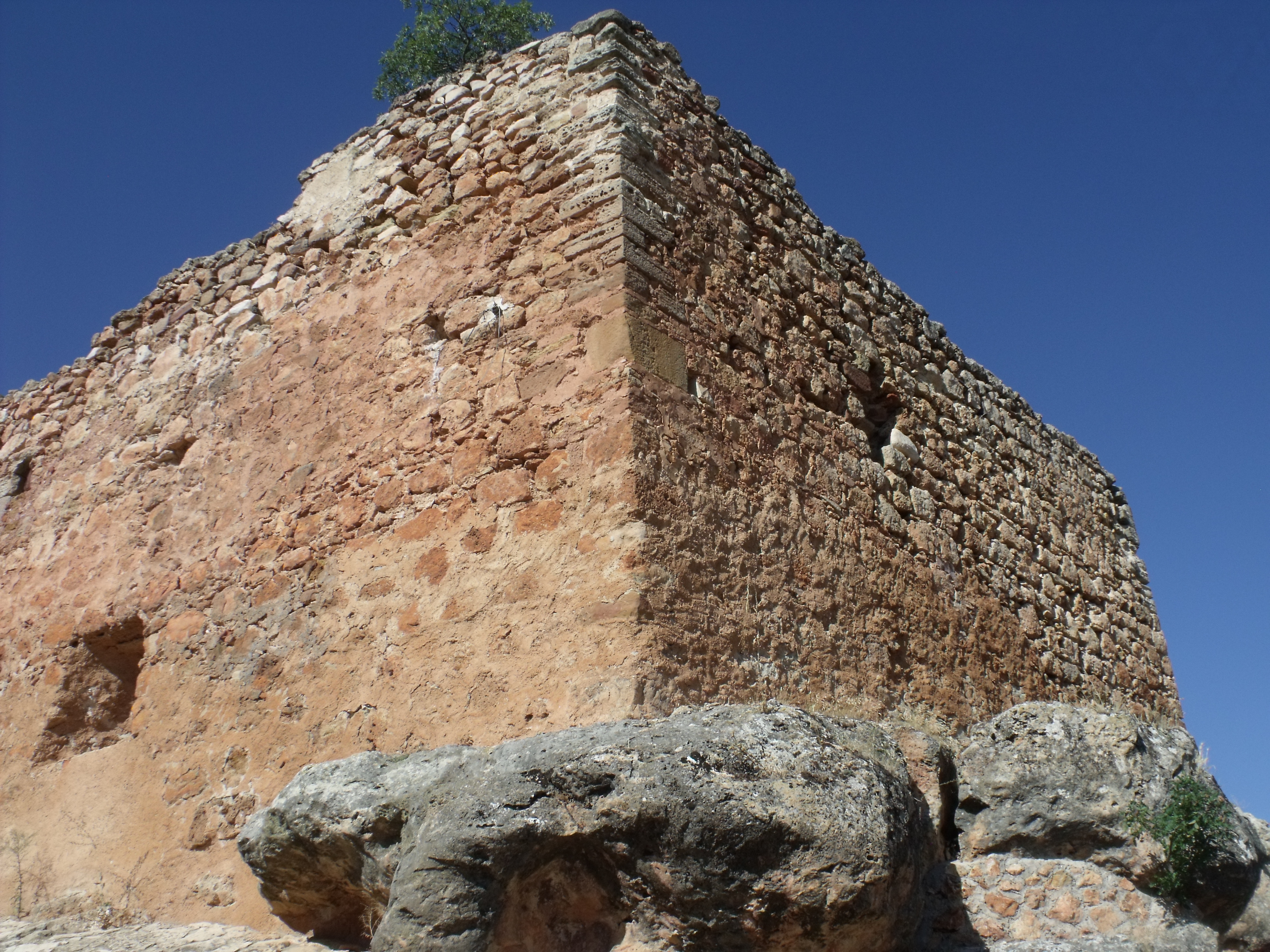
- View of the Castle

General information
- Status: Ruined
- Location: Albaladejo, Province of Ciudad Real
- Country: Spain
- Coordinates: 38°37′10″N 2°48′17″W

The Castle of Paterno (Spanish: Castillo de Paterno), also known as Castle of Albaladejo, is a fortress located in the town of Albaladejo, in the province of Ciudad Real, Spain.

== History ==
The castle is of Roman origin, later conquered by the Arabs and re-built in the 13th century. It belonged to the Orden of Santiago, who helped to maintain the castle.

== Design ==
It is a small rectangular fortress. The central area has not been preserved and currently there are only two towers of the castle left.

== Current situation ==
It is in a state of ruin. The castle falls under the protection of the Declaration of the Decree of April 22, 1949, and Law 16/1985 on Spanish Historical Heritage. As of 2023, it is open to tourism all year with free passage and entry.

== Surroundings ==
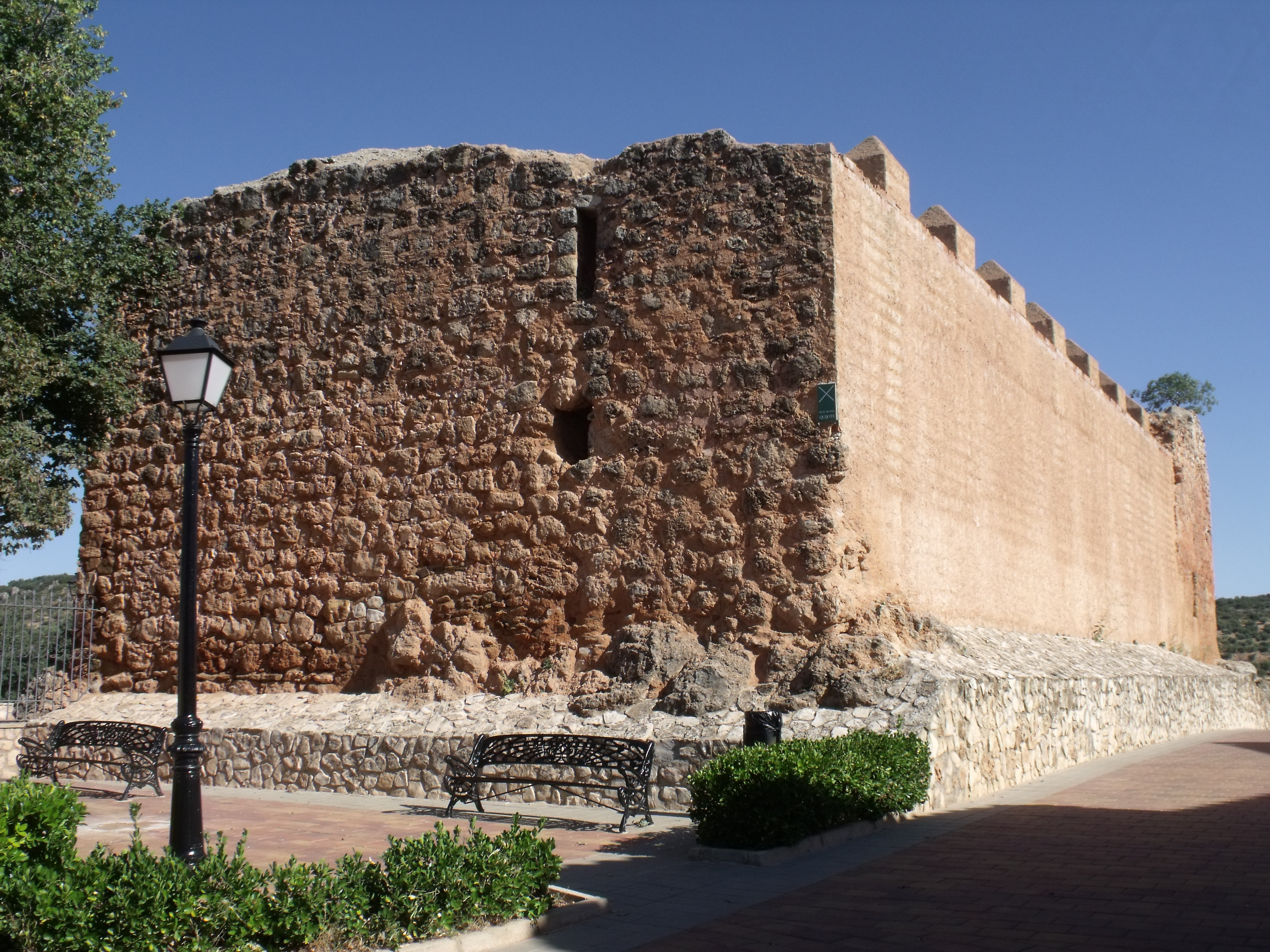

The Roman village of the Bridge of Olmilla: In this bridge, near Albaladejo, remains of a Roman village have been found together with interesting mosaics.

The Church of Santiago is a 16th-century church close to the castle.

== Sources ==
castillos.net monumentalnet.org
