= Bradford Hotel (New York City) =

Hotel in Manhattan, New York

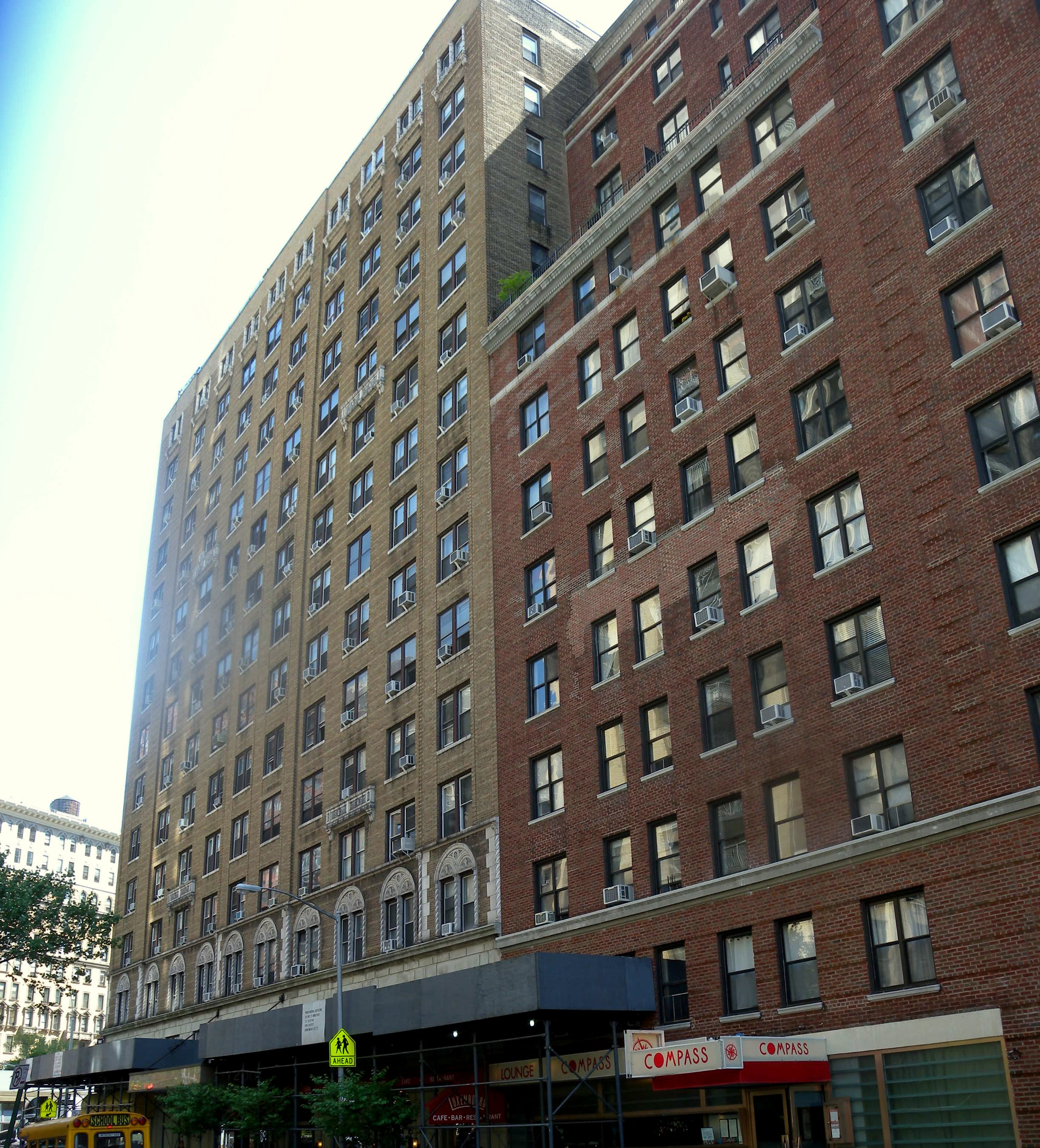
- Bradford (right) and Chalmont in 2011

General information
- Location: 206-22 West 70th Street; New York, NY
- Coordinates: 40°46′38.7″N 73°59′00.7″W
- Opened: October 18, 1924

Design and construction
- Architect: George F. Pelham

The Bradford Hotel is a New York City establishment which opened on October 18, 1924, at 206 - 22 West 70th Street in Manhattan. It cost $2 million to build and was designed by George F. Pelham. It was owned by the Lapidus Engineering Company, the same firm that controlled the Hotel Oxford, which opened in 1923. The apartment hotel is sixteen stories and occupied a plot 150 by 100 between Broadway (Manhattan) and West End Avenue. It contains four hundred rooms, each with private bathrooms, kitchenettes, and many with terraces. It was being converted to a project for the elderly by January 1970.

== Ownership history ==
In January 1954, the Marson Corporation, headed by Morris and Rubin Marcus, purchased the lease on the Bradford Hotel. The lease ran for sixteen years and was sold through Des Gabor, vice-president of the M. Morgenthau Seixas Company, brokers. The lease mandated a yearly rental of more than $110,000. In March 1959 the lease was bought by the Lincoln Bradford Corporation headed by William Pitchford. The Pitchford group held it until August 1959 when it was purchased by a group headed by Jack Brooks. From the Brooks syndicate the lease was purchased by Jack Tish, Herbert Tenenbaum, and Aaron Rashap. A 1950s Lincoln Square development project left the Bradford and the adjoining Chalfonte Hotel intact.

== Noteworthy resident ==
Isidor Kiefer, a retired machine tools manufacturer from Worms, Germany, was a resident of the Bradford Hotel, when he died in October 1961. He came to the United States as a refugee in 1935. Kiefer was the author of a history of the Worms synagogue, to which he belonged. He assisted in rebuilding the synagogue which had been destroyed by the Nazis.
