= Hudson View Gardens =

Apartment complex in New York City

- U.S. National Register of Historic Places
- New York State Register of Historic Places
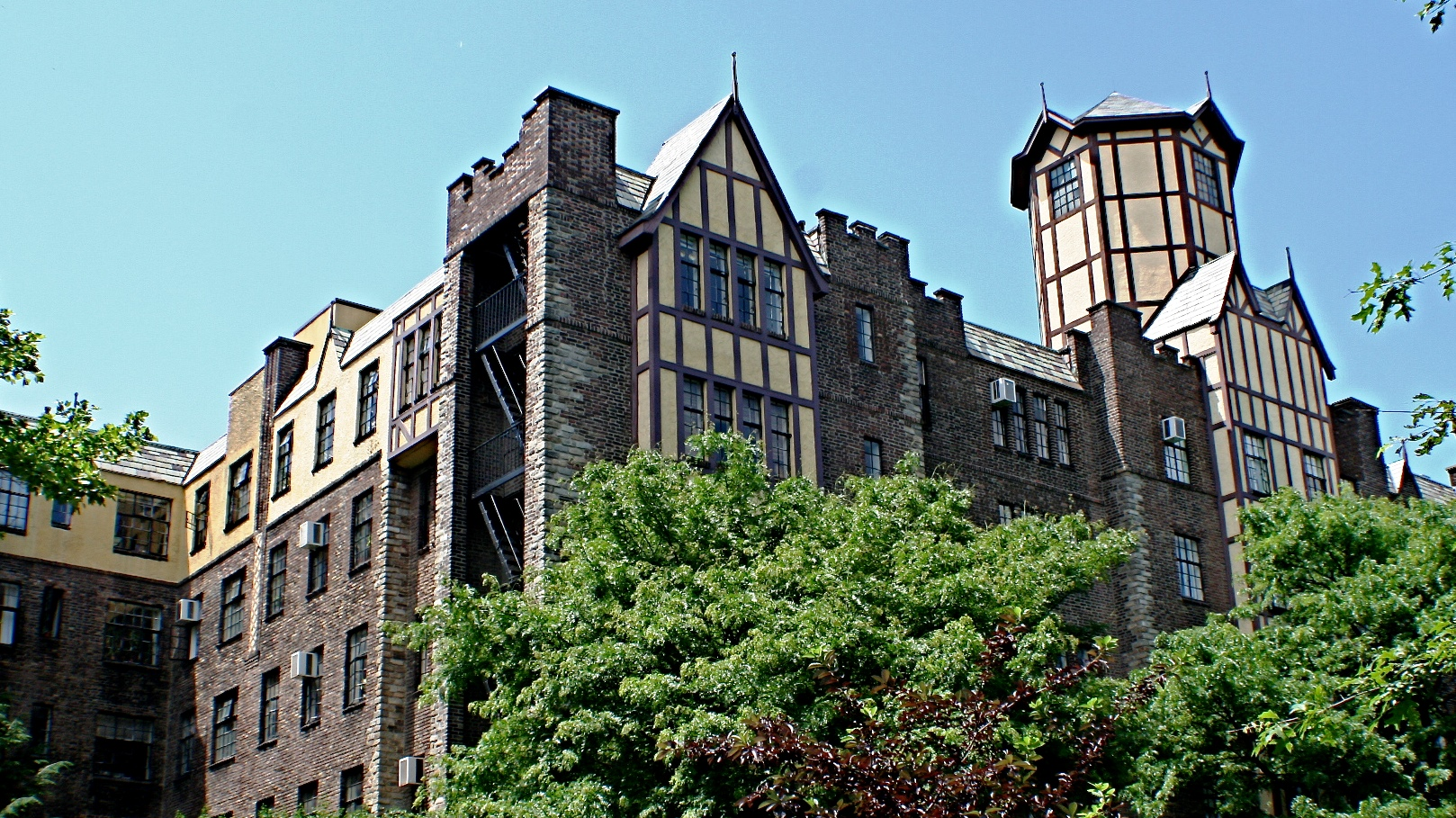
- Building D elevations, 2009

- Location within New York City
- Location: Hudson Heights, New York, NY
- Coordinates: 40°51′14.88″N 73°56′20.56″W
- Built: 1923–24
- Architect: George F. Pelham
- Architectural style: Tudor Revival
- Website: hudsonviewgardens.com
- NRHP reference No.: 16000020
- NYSRHP No.: 06101.019057

Significant dates
- Added to NRHP: February 16, 2016
- Designated NYSRHP: December 23, 2015

Hudson View Gardens is a cooperative apartment complex located on Pinehurst Avenue and Cabrini Boulevard in the near vicinity of West 183rd and 185th Streets, located in the Hudson Heights subsection of the Washington Heights neighborhood in Manhattan, New York City. It overlooks the Hudson River to the west and Bennett Park – which includes Manhattan's highest natural point – to the east. The complex was constructed as a housing cooperative from 1923 to 1925. In 2016 it was listed on the National Register of Historic Places.

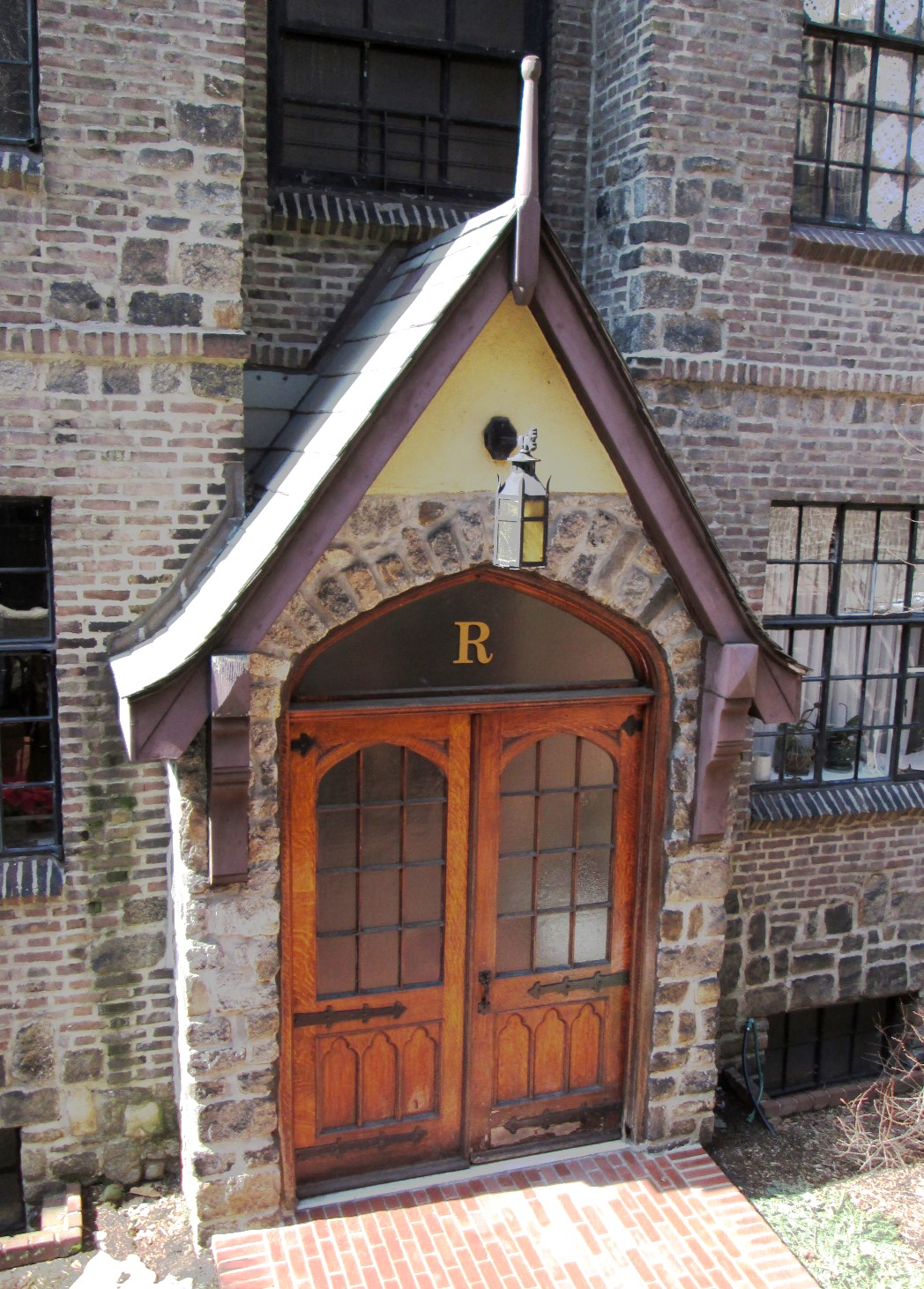
The entrance to Building R, one of the four-story walk-up buildings

At a time when some believed that only the wealthy or poor could afford to live in Manhattan, affordable urban housing was viewed a solution to the problem of the middle-class flight to the suburbs. Charles V. Paterno, a real estate developer best known for his extensive work in Morningside Heights, purchased land on Pinehurst Avenue and Cabrini Boulevard, between West 182nd and 186th Streets, across the street from his estate, atop a ridge above the Hudson River. His plan was to create a "garden community" of cooperative apartments to attract those who desired the comforts of the era's garden city movement-inspired upper middle class suburbs (exemplified by the eponymous Garden City, New York and Mountain Lakes, New Jersey) but also wished to remain in New York City.

The project was designed by architect George F. Pelham with landscaping by landscape architect Robert B. Cridland from Philadelphia. Pelham's fifteen buildings in the complex occupy 40% of the 3.869-acre (15,660 m^{2}) site. The nine six-story elevator buildings and six four-story walk-ups were situated to make use of the open space and the expansive views of the Hudson River to the west and Bennett Park to the east. Its use of Tudor-style architectural elements in the facade came two years before the construction of Tudor City, the other major Tudor complex in Manhattan. The AIA Guide to New York City describes the complex as "Scarsdale Tudor."

Pelham also designed another apartment building in the neighborhood, The Pinehurst, which was built in 1907 at the corner of Fort Washington Avenue and West 180th Street. Pelham's son, George F. Pelham Jr., was the architect of Castle Village, a Hudson Heights neighbor of Hudson View Gardens across Cabrini Avenue, which was built in 1938.

At the time of its construction, Hudson View Gardens was the largest housing cooperative in New York and one of the earliest aimed at the middle class. Today it is known throughout Hudson Heights as the home of beautifully manicured gardens, its own playground, and U.S. mail delivered directly to each apartment. Community events are hosted in the Hudson View Lounge, many of which are free and open to the public.

== See also ==
- National Register of Historic Places listings in Manhattan above 110th Street
