= Palermi =

Palermi is a surname. Notable people with the surname include:

- Amleto Palermi (1889–1941), Italian film director and screenwriter
- Giovanna Palermi (born 1964), Italian softball player
- Manuela Palermi (born 1942), Italian politician and journalist

== See also ==
- Palermo (surname), another surname
