= Castle Village =

Apartment complex in Manhattan, New York

Coordinates: 40°51′10.80″N 73°56′24.60″W

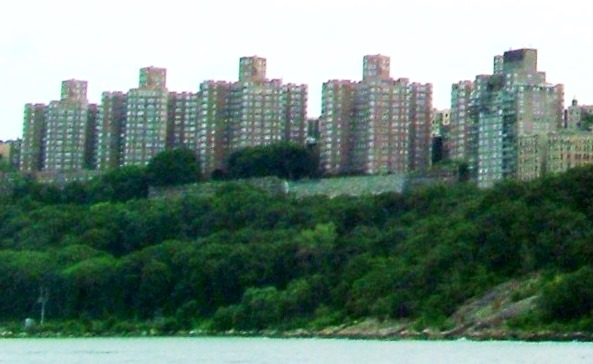
The five buildings of Castle Village as seen from the Hudson River in July 2005, showing the collapsed retaining wall under the fourth building from the left

Castle Village is a five-building cooperative apartment complex located on Cabrini Boulevard between West 181st and 186th Streets in the Hudson Heights neighborhood of Manhattan, New York City. It was built in 1938–1939 by real estate developer Charles V. Paterno on the 7.5 acres (30,000 m^{2}) site of what had been the castle that was his residence, and was designed by George F. Pelham, Jr., whose father, George F. Pelham, had designed the nearby Hudson View Gardens.

The buildings were some of the first apartment towers to employ reinforced concrete construction. Each floor contains nine apartments, eight of which have river views.

The complex was initially a rental property, but converted to a cooperative in 1985. A few original tenants still rent.

== Architecture ==
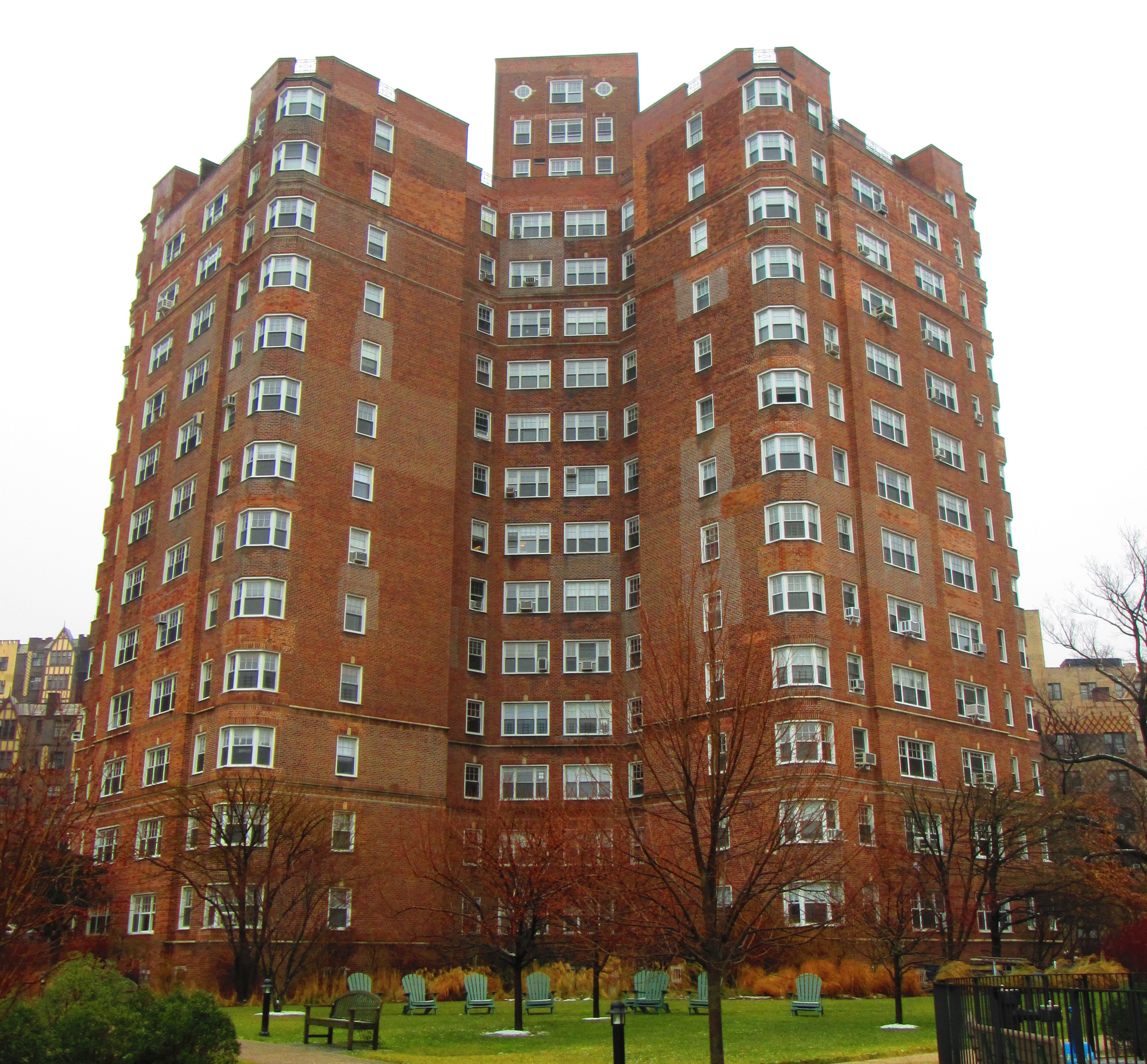
One of the towers from the west

The design of the towers was influenced by medieval European castle keeps. The cross design of the towers and the "towers in a park" layout was later used in most of New York's social and affordable housing. The labor movement-owned United Housing Foundation built tens of thousands of cooperative apartments using a similar layout. The reinforced concrete construction was also copied in cooperative developments. Private rental housing, like those built in Parkchester and Stuyvesant Town residential developments followed the architectural design, but replaced the concrete frame with a cheaper steel frame construction.

== Retaining wall ==
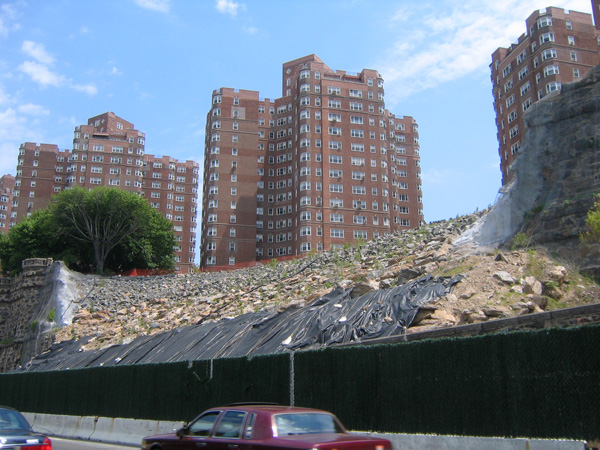
The collapsed retaining wall, a year after it fell

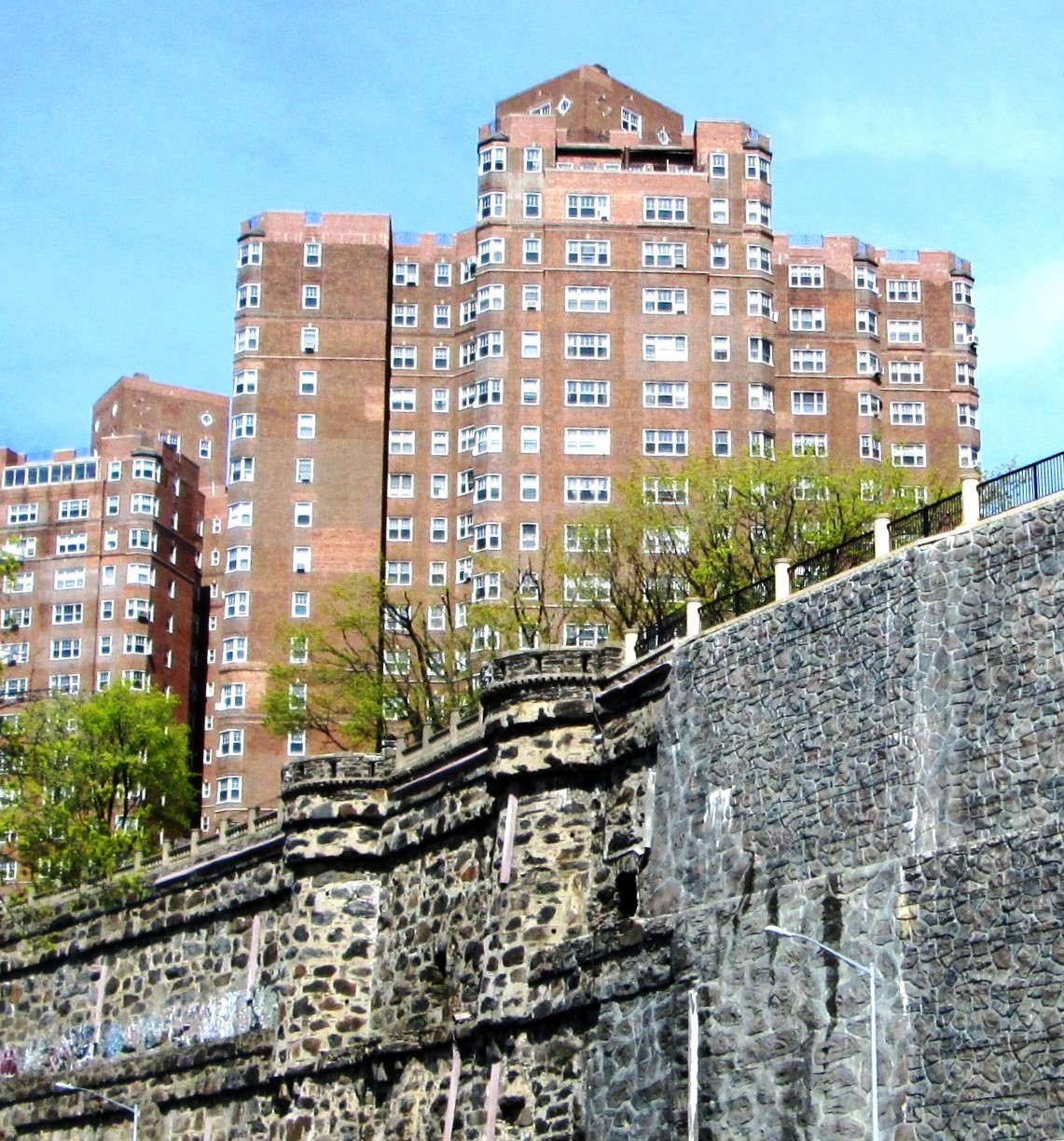
The retaining wall rebuilt; the new section is to the right.

On May 12, 2005, a 75-foot retaining wall below the garden that faces the Hudson River collapsed, resulting a massive landslide which buried the northbound lanes of the Henry Hudson Parkway and six parked cars. The collapse stopped traffic on the highway for several days, but the clean-up began quickly, and the road re-opened on May 15. However, an entry ramp to the highway remained closed for almost two years. No one was injured. A later study found that the collapse could have been prevented.

Reconstruction of the wall and garden, which had been built in 1925 and supported the complex's lawn, was substantially completed by October 2007, at the cost of $24 million. The access ramp to the Henry Hudson Parkway below the wall was partially reopened in March 2008. All reconstruction on the wall, including the full opening of the access ramp was complete by November 2010. Castle Village residents lost their suit against the Internal Revenue Service over tax deductions related to the repair.

== See also ==
- Paterno Castle (New York City)
- Charles V. Paterno
