= George F. Pelham =

American architect

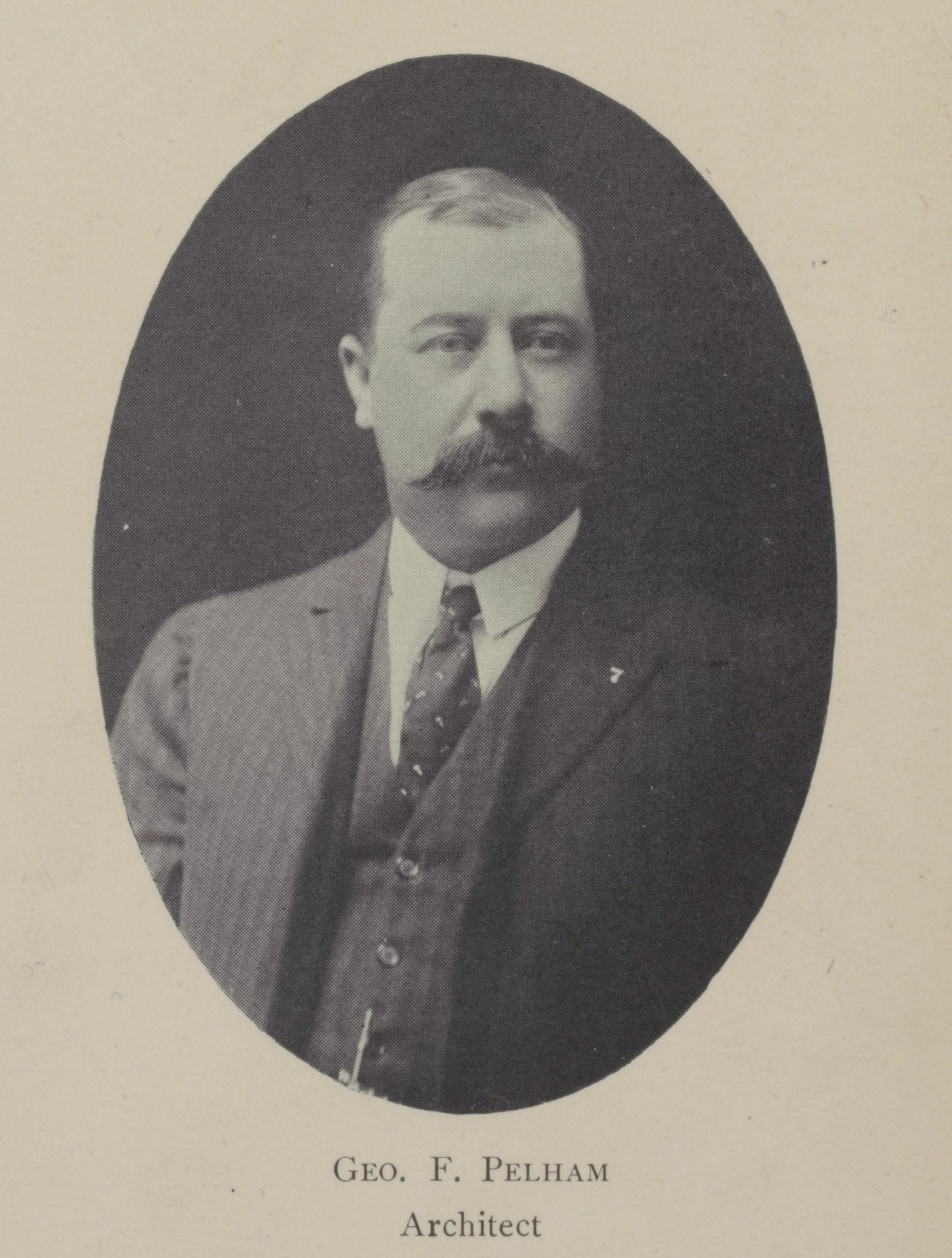
George F. Pelham.

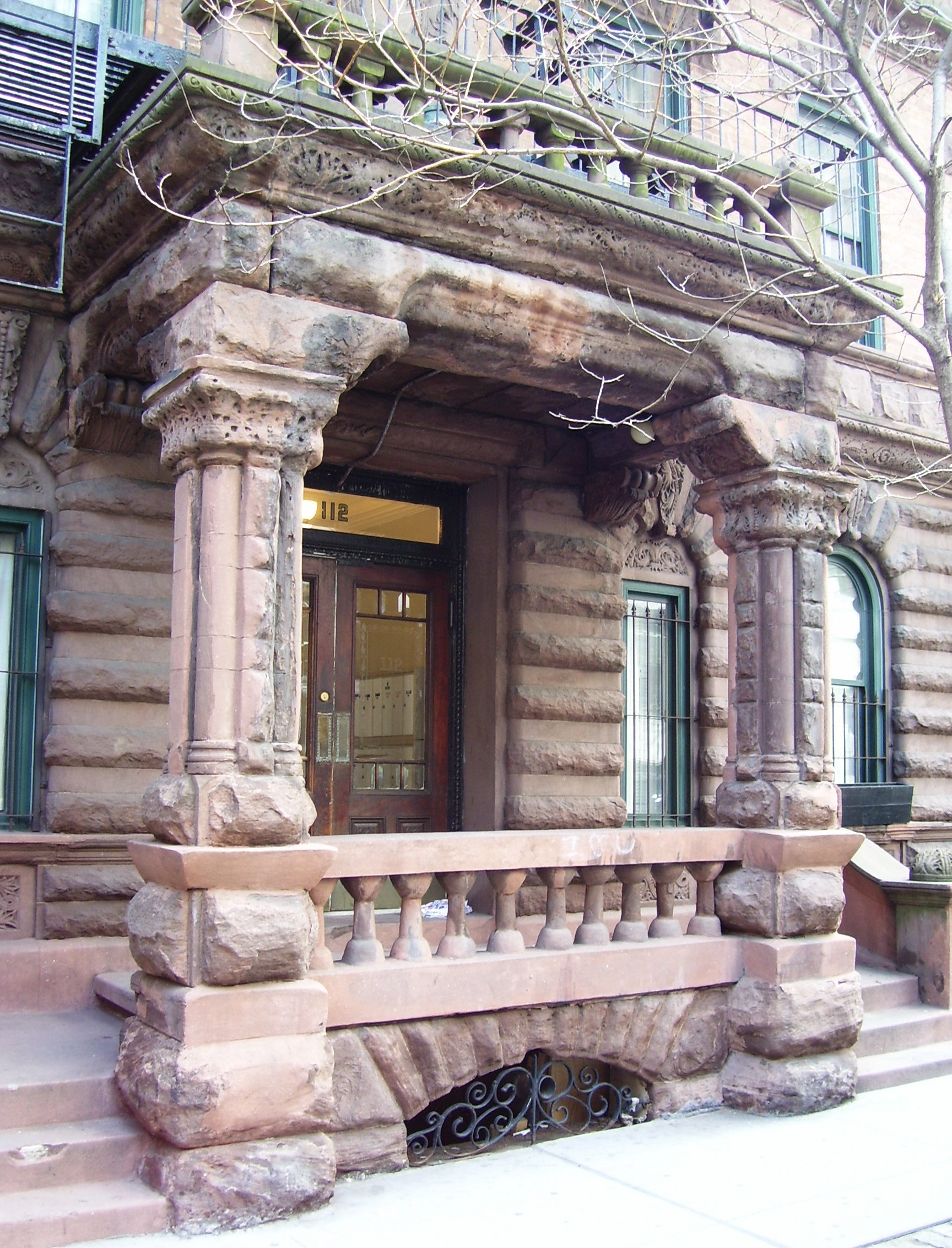
The entrance to 112 East 17th Street (1890-91), built as the Fanwood Hotel, between Union Square East and Irving Place in the Union Square neighborhood of Manhattan

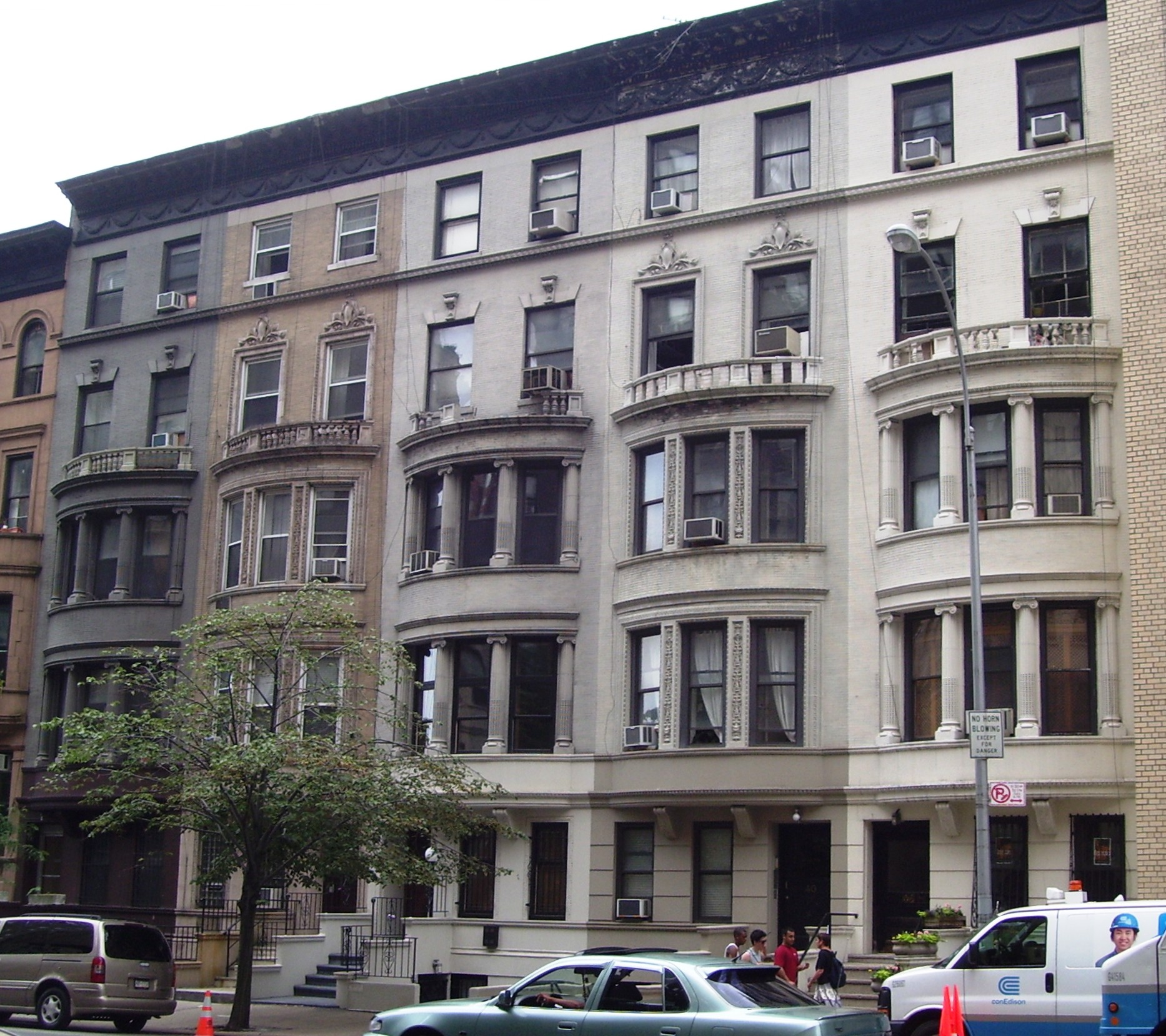
34-42 West 96th Street (1897), five townhouses in Renaissance Revival stye between Central Park West and Columbus Avenue on the Upper West Side of Manhattan

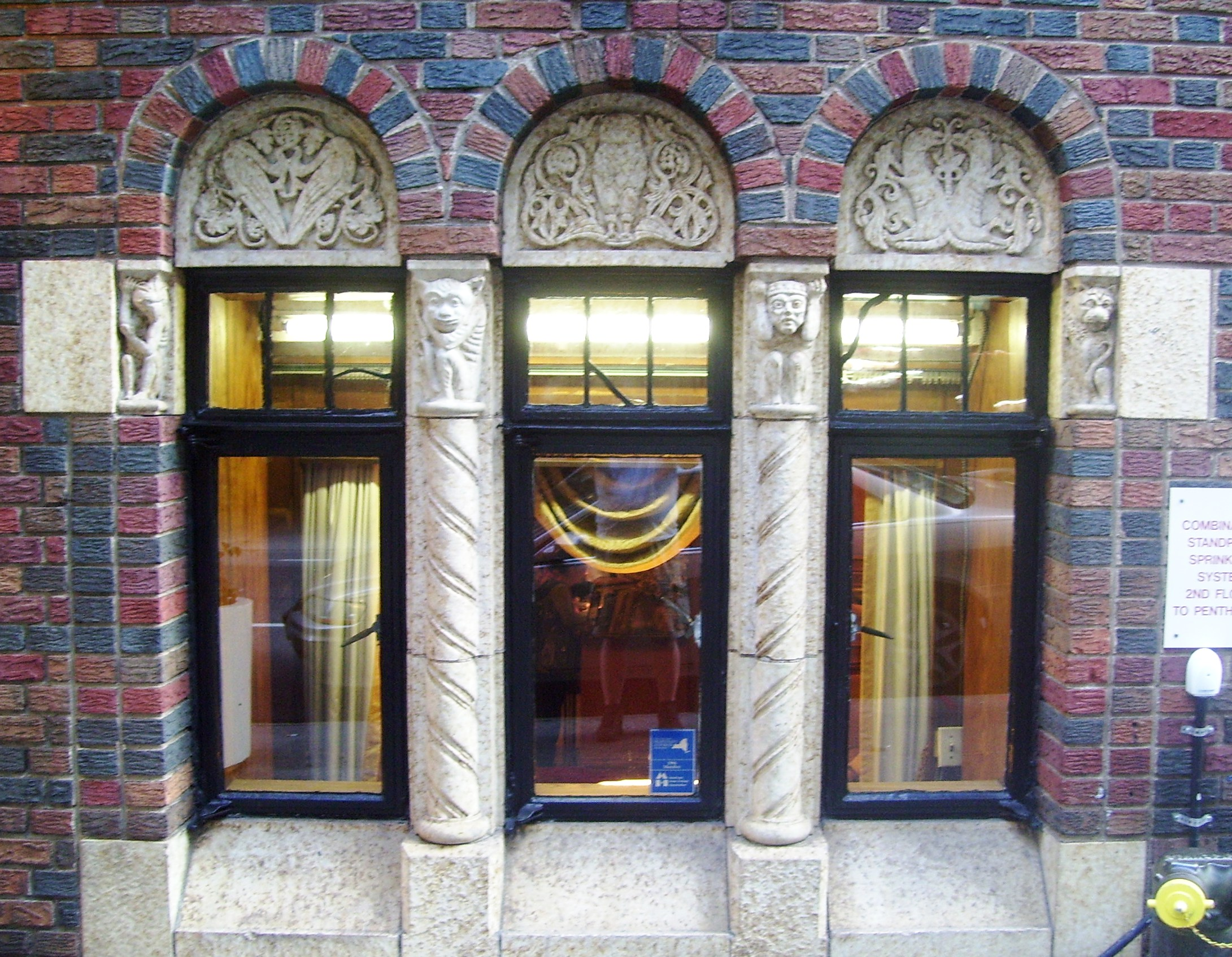
Window treatment on the Hotel Bedford (1928-29), 118 East 40th Street between Park and Lexington Avenues in the Murray Hill neighborhood of Manhattan

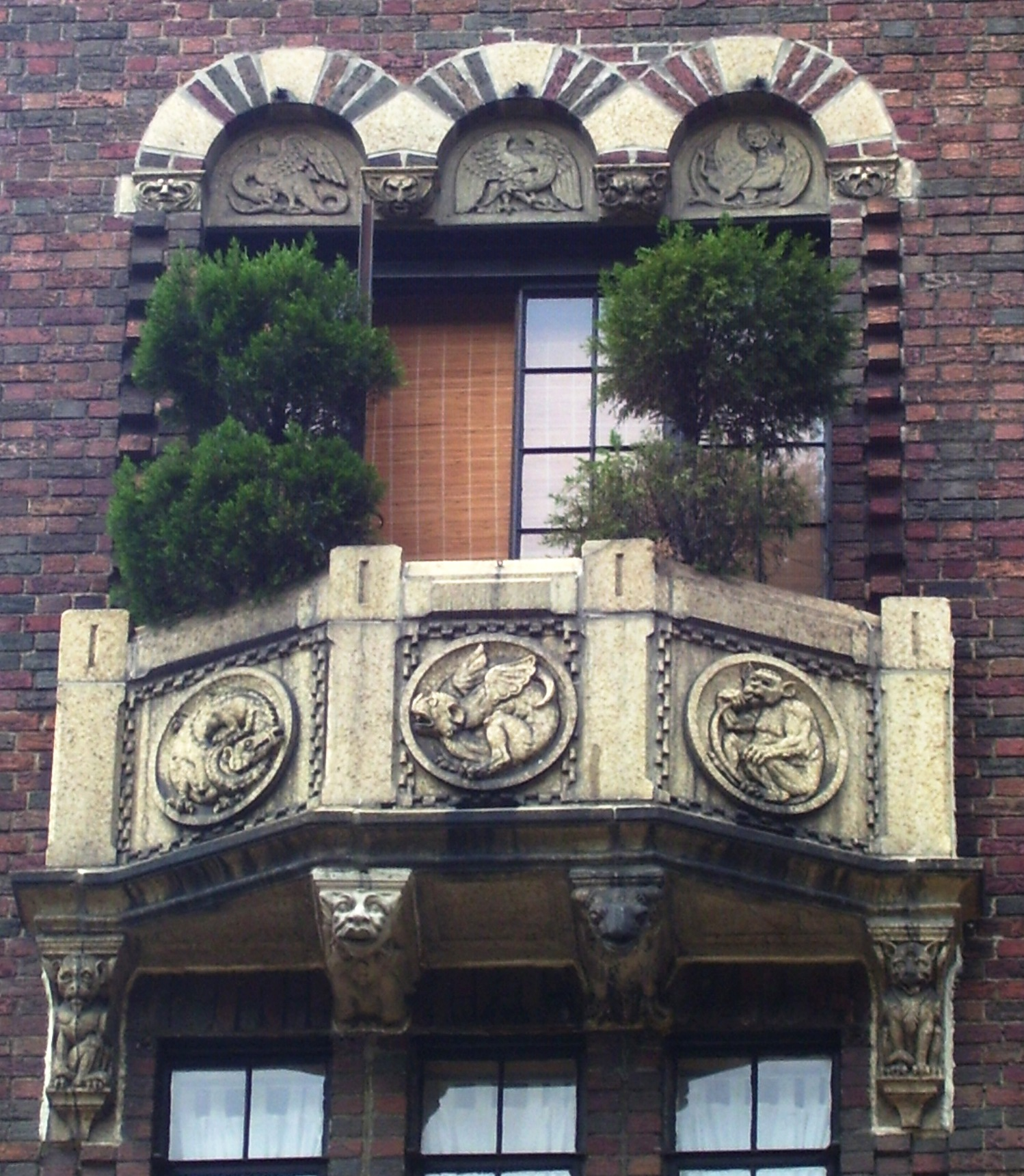
A balcony at 81 Irving Place (1930) at the corner of East 19th Street in Gramercy Park neighborhood of Manhattan

George Frederick Pelham (1867 – February 7, 1937) was an American architect and the son of George Brown Pelham, who was also an architect.

== Life and career ==
Pelham was born in Ottawa, Ontario, coming to New York City when his father opened an architectural office there in 1875. The elder Pelham designed for the city's Department of Public Parks, and employed his son as a draftsman in his firm. After being privately tutored in architecture, the younger Pelham opened his own office in 1890, specializing in apartment houses and hotels, row houses, and commercial buildings and utilizing the Renaissance Revival, Gothic Revival and Colonial Revival styles. His work is particularly represented on the Upper West Side of Manhattan. He designed buildings for 43 years; his final building was the Central Hanover Bank and Trust Company Building.

Pelham was the architect of the Chalfonte Hotel at 200 West 70th Street in Manhattan. Built in 1927, it was later converted to rental apartments and is still standing today.

In 1905, he designed the Riverdale apartment building at 67 Riverside Drive for developer John Louis Miller. It opened on October 31, 1907. In 1905 he also designed a new synagogue building for Brooklyn's Beth Jacob Anshe Sholom, based on Arnold Brunner's West Side Synagogue building on Manhattan's West 88th Street. The synagogue is no longer extant.

For many years the office was at 200 West 72nd Street, originally built as a clubhouse for the Colonial Club of New-York. Pelham, like Rosario Candela, chose that address because a number of developers had their offices there, including Paterno & Son and Anthony Campagna.

Pelham's son George Fred Pelham Jr. joined the firm in 1910 and continued the family tradition; he was the architect of a number of New York City buildings, such as Castle Village in 1938-1939, 411 West End Avenue in 1937, and 1150 Park Avenue in 1940.

== Works ==
Building Name	Floors	Year
St. James House (501 West 113th Street)	20	1931
121 East 31st Street	12	1931
1120 Park Avenue	19	1930
47 East 88th Street	16	1930
Atlantic Bank of New York (960 Sixth Avenue)	16	1930
77 Second Avenue	6	1903
125 Second Avenue	7	1901
81 Irving Place	14	1930
98 Riverside Drive	17	1929
50 West 96th Street	15	1929
944 Park Avenue	15	1929
400 East 58th Street	16	1929
14 East 90th Street	12	1929
Bedford Hotel (118 East 40th Street)	17	1928-29
Belvoir Apartments (470 West End Avenue)	16	1928
245 Fifth Avenue	26	1927
33 Riverside Drive	17	1927
331 W 84th Street	5	1894
585 West End Avenue	17	1927
115 East 86th Street	16	1927
310 West 106th Street	16	1927
The Broadmoor (235 West 102nd Street)	16	1927
The Marbro (171 West 79th Street)	16	1927
175 West 79th Street	16	1927
21 East 90th Street	16	1927
315 East 84th Street	6	1905
Beekman Apartments (30 Beekman Place)	15	1927
Chalfonte Hotel (200 West 70th Street)	15	1927
263 West 38th Street	17	1926
1225 Park Avenue	16	1926
243-253 East 78th Street	6	1905
20 West 77th Street	16	1926
Park Royal Hotel (23 West 73rd Street)	16	1926
164 West 79th Street	15	1926
Hotel Milburn (242 West 76th Street)	15	1926
The Olcott (27 West 72nd Street)	16	1925
10 West 86th Street	15	1925
1136 5th Avenue	15	1925
910 West End Avenue	15	1925
Surrey Apartments (215 West 83rd Street)	15	1925
1160 Park Avenue	14	1925
964 Madison Avenue	5	1925
Hudson View Gardens (116 Pinehurst Avenue)	6	1924-25
Hotel Plaza Athénée (37 East 64th Street)	16	1924
The Florence (545 West End Avenue)	16	1924
314 West 77th Street	9	1924
140 West 86th Street	15	1924
161 West 54th Street	15	1924
290 Riverside Drive	15	1924
Bradford Hotel (210 West 70th Street)	15	1924
Butler Hall (400 West 119th Street)	15	1924
The Gatsby (65 East 96th Street)	15	1924
300 Riverside Drive	14	1924
136 East 36th Street	12	1924
Marboro Apartments (171 West 79th Street)	16	1923
135 East 74th Street	12	1923
130 East 94th Street	9	1923
Oxford Apartments (205 West 88th Street)	15	1922
29 East 64th Street	12	1922
710 West End Avenue	15	1920
270 West End Avenue	13	1918
533-539 West 150th Street (row houses)	5	1915
Bellguard Apartments (216 West 89th Street)	12	1915
Buchova Apartments	12	1915
385 Edgecombe Avenue	6	1913
36 West 25th Street	16	1912
44 West 28th Street	16	1912
675 West End Avenue	16	1912
Francis Edmund Court (423 West 120th Street)	10	1912
Soundview Court (260 Convent Avenue)	10	1911-12
133 West 21st Street	12	1911
37 West 28th Street	12	1911
72 Madison Avenue	12	1911
137-139 Grand Street	7	1911
The Woodhull (62 Pierrepont Street, Brooklyn)	8	1911
Raymore Court (238 West 106th Street)	6	1910
Hadson Hotel (31 West 34th Street)	12	1910
The Cliffden (265 Riverside Drive)	11	1909
15 East 32nd Street	12	1909
Fowler Court (400 Riverside Drive)	12	1909
The Lansdown (352-354 West 46th Street, now the Lyric)	6	1908
The Riverdale (67 Riverside Drive)	9	1907
[Eleanor Thomas] Elliott Hall (49 Claremont Avenue)	6	1906
Kennedy House (47 Claremont Avenue)	6	1906
Concord Hall (468 Riverside Drive)	12	1906-07
17 West 17th Street	11	1907
Woodward Hall (50 East 96th Street)	6	1905
The Fairholm (503 W. 121st Street)	6	1905
Congregation Beth Jacob Ohev Sholom (274–276 South 3rd Street, Brooklyn)	Unknown	1905
Dream Hotel (210 West 55th Street)	13	1904
224-226 Avenue B	6	1904
504-508 East 12th Street	6	1904
Parc 77 (50 West 77th Street)	13	1903
36 West 22nd Street	7	1903
441-461 East 140th Street, The Bronx (tenements)	5	1902-03
34-42 West 96th Street (row houses)	4	1897
616 West 113th Street (row house)	4 + basement	1897
32-36 West 85th Street (row houses)	5	1897
97 Wooster Street	7	1896-97
526 West 114th Street	5	1897
42 Hudson Street	6	1896
16-22 West 68th Street (row houses)	5	1896
347 West Broadway	7	1895-96
495 Broome Street	7	1895-96
397 Washington Street	6	1895-96
303-309 West 103rd Street (row houses)	3	1895-96
93 Crosby Street	6	1894-95
18 North Moore Street	5	1894
The Fanwood (112-114 East 17th Street)	6	1890-91
123 Second Avenune	5 (formerly 3)	1913
Congregation Kehilath Jeshurun (117 East 85th Street)	5	1902

Sources (unless otherwise noted):
