= Paterna (surname) =

Paterna is a surname. Notable people with the surname include:

- Maria Paterna (born 2000), Greek footballer
- Peter Paterna (1937–2018), German politician

== See also ==
- Paterno (surname)
- Palermo (surname)
