= Paterno Castle (New York City) =

Castle in Manhattan, New York (1905–38)

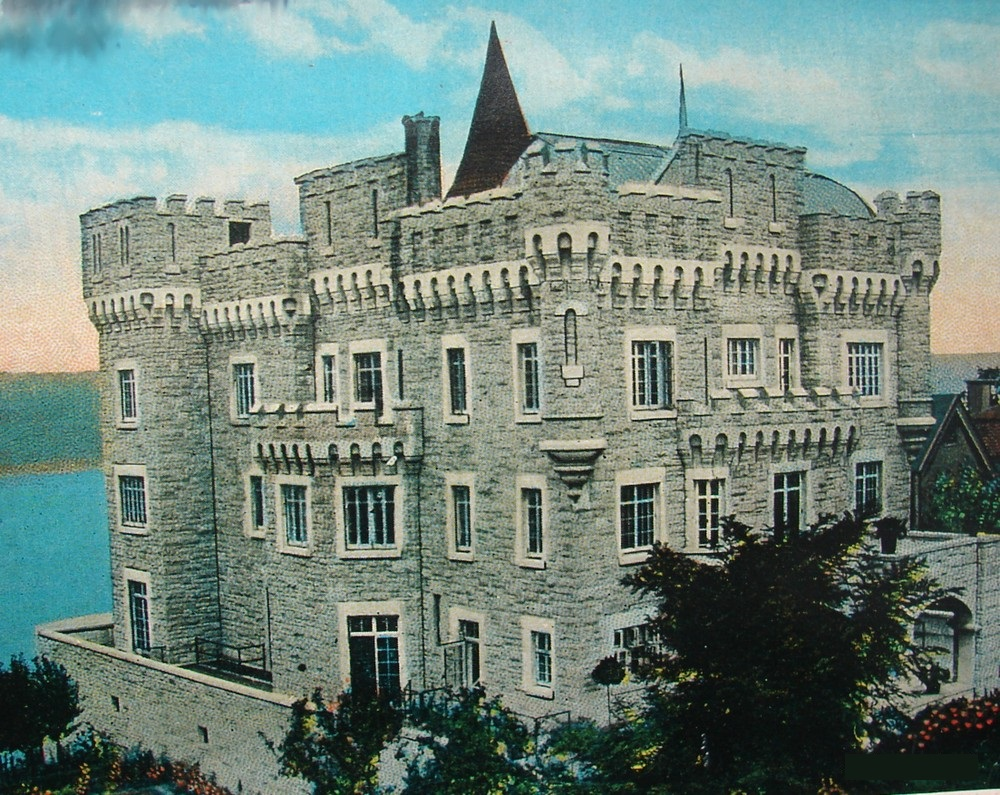
- Postcard showing the castle, 1920s
- Interactive map of the Paterno Castle area

General information
- Status: Demolished
- Location: New York City, USA, New York City, USA
- Coordinates: 40°51′14″N 73°56′21″W
- Construction started: 1905
- Completed: 1916
- Destroyed: 1938
- Landlord: Charles V. Paterno

The Paterno Castle was a residential castle on Riverside Drive and Northern Boulevard (now Cabrini Boulevard), between 181st and 185th Streets in the Hudson Heights neighborhood of Washington Heights, Upper Manhattan, New York City, which was built in 1905 by Charles V. Paterno and demolished by him in 1938. The Castle Village apartment complex is now located on the property.

== Background ==
In the late 19th century, Upper Manhattan was still primarily farmland and marsh dotted with occasional small houses and taverns- a bucolic setting that would soon begin to disappear with the arrival of the Industrial Revolution. The clean air and remoteness of the area soon attracted newly created millionaires who built homes that were extravagant monuments to display their wealth.

Reportedly inspired by a European castle whose surroundings reminded Charles V. Paterno of the Fort Washington area, in 1905 gave orders to start building the castle which John C. Watson designed. The four-story castle cost a gigantic sum of $500,000 (equivalent to $17,900,000 in 2025) to build. The castle, was located on the site of what is today's Castle Village apartment complex.

== Structure ==
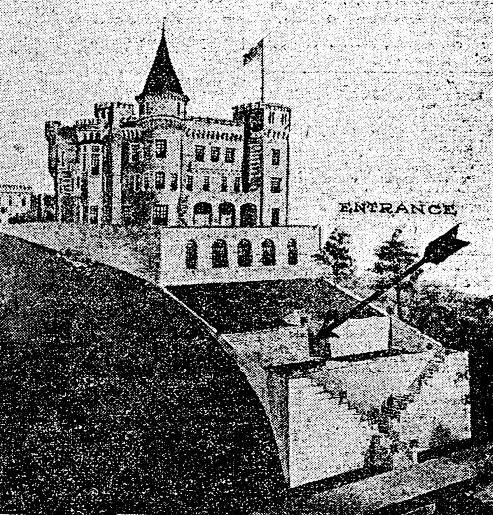
Image of the Paterno Castle, showing the underground passageway, 1908

The centerpiece of Paterno's seven-acre (2.8 ha) estate, located in what is now the Hudson Heights neighborhood was a 35-room four-story Neo-Gothic mansion in the form of a castle. The building's white marble facade featured large turrets, and the entrance was a 75-foot (23 m) underground passageway that went under the building's front. The main reception hall was 80 feet (24 m) above street level, off of which were Paterno's den and a parlor, music room, and library.

Although the building's facade was medieval, the interior design was not. Each room was decorated in a different style: Louis XV for the parlor, Colonial for the dining room, Asian for the library. An antique clock in the entrance hall triggered chimes on the hour and half-hour in the castle's tower and, at certain times of the day, operated a $7,000 organ on the second floor gallery. The organ was expanded in 1910, 1911, 1913, and 1927, at the cost of tens of thousands of dollars. When the castle was slated for demolition, the organ was purchased and donated to St. Paul's Episcopal Church in Glen Cove, New York.

The second floor was the location of the bedrooms, each entered through its own vestibule, as opposed to directly from the hallway. The master bedroom measured 20 by 80 feet (6.1 by 24.4 m). The floor also had a nursery and a sewing room.

On the third floor were the banquet hall and ballroom, each 50 square feet (4.6 m^{2}) with 20-foot (6.1 m) ceilings, and a billiard room. The ballroom had balconies with views of the Hudson River.

Half of the roof was dedicated to a roof garden with a foot and a half of soil. It featured a large conservatory, an aviary, and a solarium.

The basement had massage rooms, Turkish baths, a grill room, a lounge, and a swimming pool that was surrounded by birdcages and filled with filtered water from the nearby Hudson. One cellar was dedicated to raising mushrooms, called the "mushroom vault".

The grounds featured Italian gardens, greenhouses, colonnades, fountains, and pergolas. At its peak, the garage held five Rolls-Royces.

== History ==
Paterno moved into the castle in 1909, although the building was not completed until 1916.

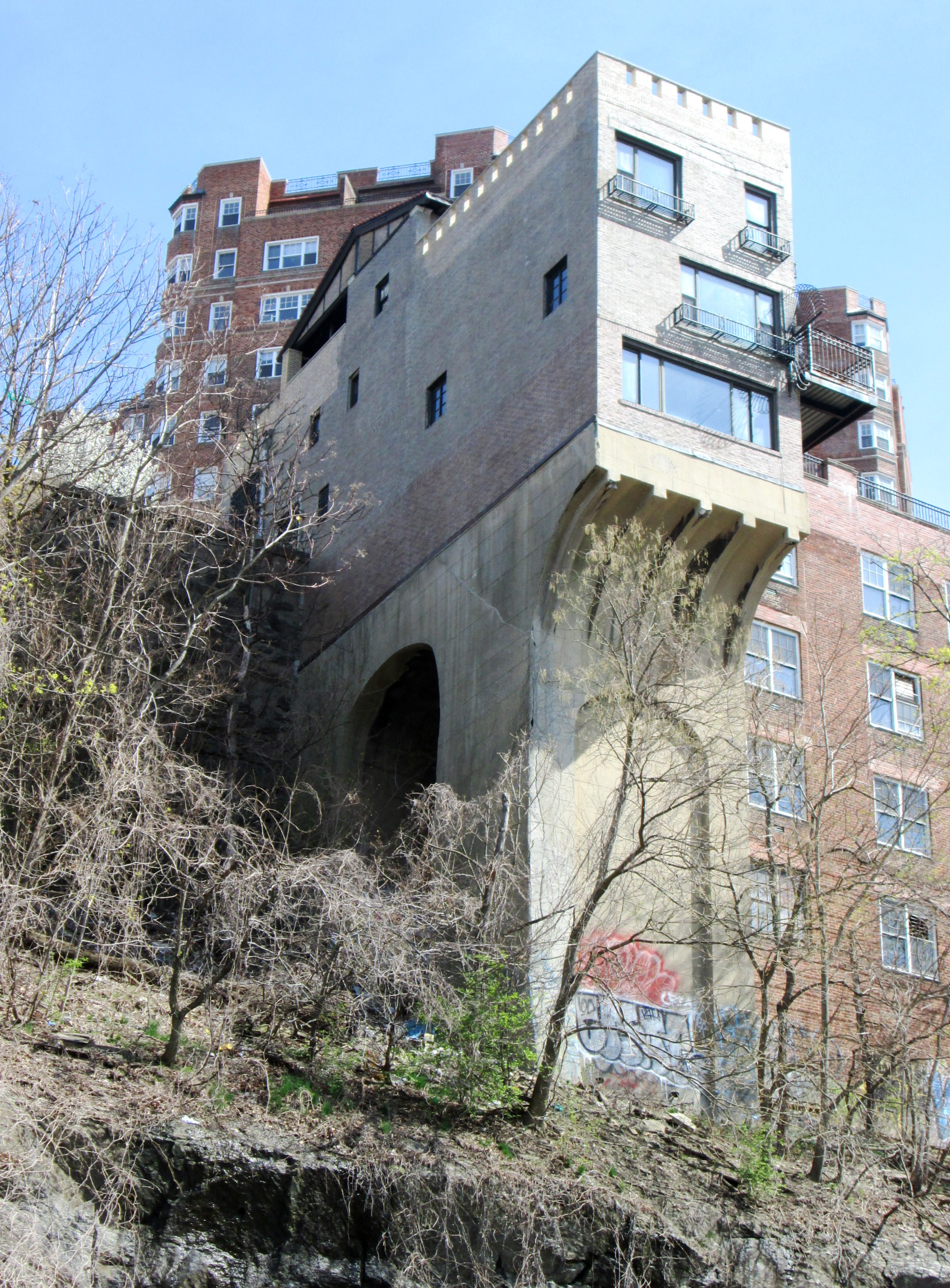
The "Pumpkin House", the former guest house of the Paterno estate as seen from the Hudson River Greenway

Paterno moved to Greenwich, Connecticut, and in 1938 he razed the castle and most of the rest of the estate to erect Castle Village complex of co-operative apartments. The area was becoming increasingly residential, and The New York Times quoted Paterno as saying that "the many improvements in that part of the city...had led to a strong residential movement in that area with a definite demand for the finer type of garden type apartments.”

Paterno died in 1946 aged 69, eight years after the castle's demolition.

== Other constituents ==
=== Guest house ===
The former guest house of the estate is a remnant leftover after the estate's redevelopment. Located at 16 Chittenden Avenue at the corner of West 186th Street, the house was built around 1925, and sits on a 250-foot (76 m) pier suspended over a sheer drop to the Henry Hudson Parkway and the Hudson River Greenway. It was commissioned by Cleveland Walcutt, an engineer, who built it on land he purchased from the estate of the editor of the New York Herald, James Gordon Bennett Jr. The house is sometimes referred to locally as "The Pumpkin House", because of its orange color when lit up at night.

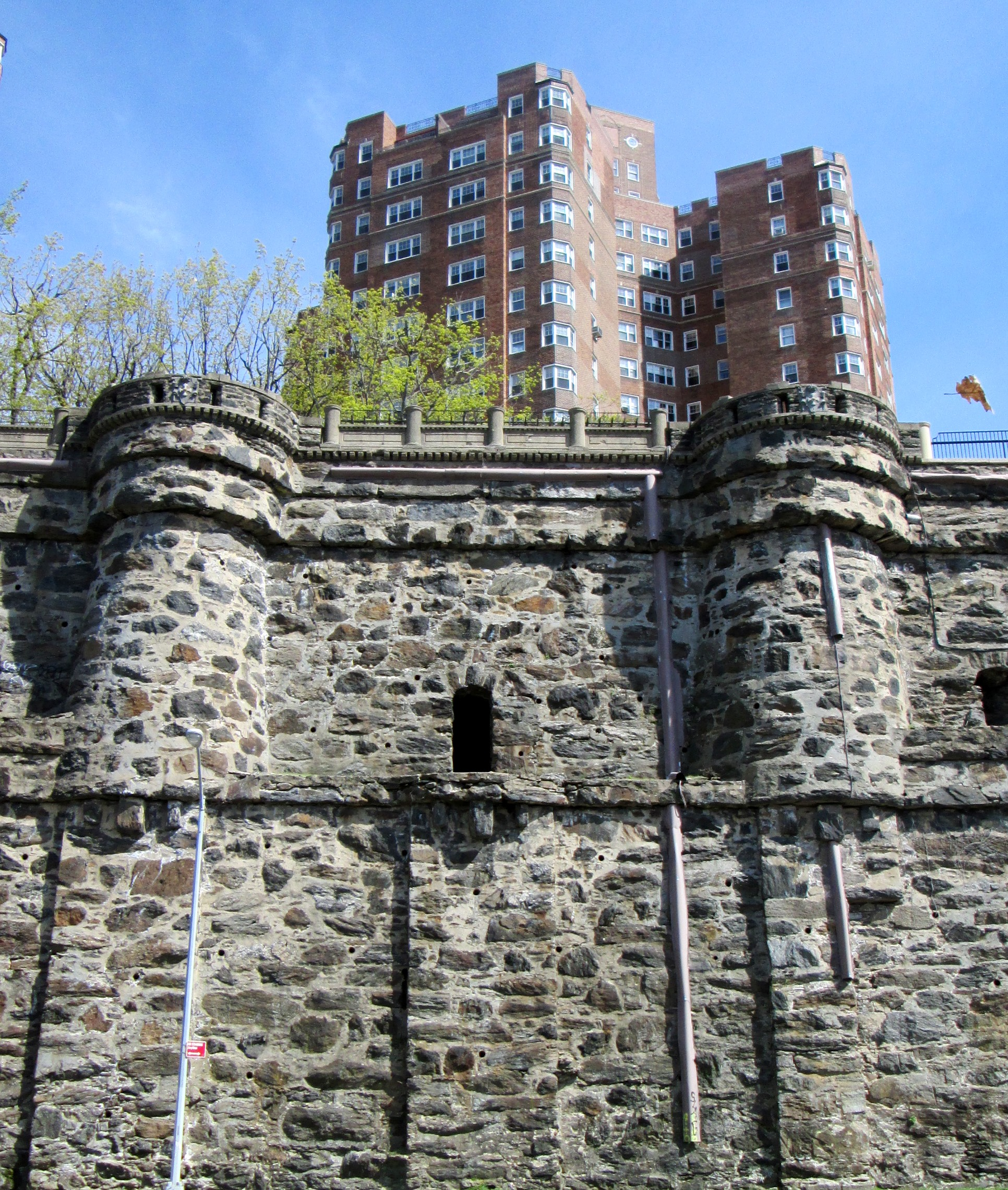
Part of the retaining wall, above which stands one of the five towers of Castle Village

The three-story, 3,144-square-foot (292.1 m^{2}), house is configured as a two-family home with separate rental one-bedroom apartment. The main unit includes a parlor floor, a dining room. a library, and a "French country" kitchen. The living room and balcony afford views of the downtown Manhattan skyline, as well as the George Washington Bridge and the Hudson River. On clear days, the new Governor Mario M. Cuomo Bridge (Tappen Zee Bridge) connecting Westchester and Rockland counties can be seen to the north. Upstairs are two master bedrooms, two additional bedrooms which can also be used as studies, and two full bathrooms.

The house was bought in 2000 for $1.1 million. By 2010 the house had only had four owners, and sold c.2011 for around $3.9 million. In 2016, it was put on the market at the asking price of $5.25 million, and after almost three years, it was sold in January 2019 for $2 million.

Several other remnants of the estate are still extant as part of the Castle Village complex.

=== Retaining wall ===
Another remnant of the Paterno estate is the 75-foot retaining wall built to protect Riverside Drive; it now protects the Henry Hudson Parkway. On May 12, 2005, the wall partly collapsed, producing a landslide that buried the northbound lanes of the parkway and six parked cars. No one was injured. The road re-opened to traffic on May 15, but an entry ramp to the highway remained closed for almost two years. A later study found that the collapse could have been prevented.

Reconstruction of the wall, which had been built in 1925, was substantially completed by October 2007, at the cost of $24 million. The access ramp to the Henry Hudson Parkway below the wall was partially reopened in March 2008. All reconstruction on the wall, including the full opening of the access ramp was complete by November 2010.
