= Paterno (surname) =

Paterno is a surname. Notable people with the surname include:

- Charles V. Paterno (1876–1946), American real estate developer
- Dolores Paterno (1854–1881), Filipina composer, sister of Pedro Paterno
- Emanuele Paternò (1847–1935), Italian chemist
- Fabio Paternò, Italian computer scientist
- Jay Paterno, Joe Paterno's son and former assistant coach to his father
- Joe Paterno (1926–2012), American college football coach
- Pedro Paterno (1857–1911), Filipino politician, poet, and novelist; brother of Dolores Paterno

== See also ==
- Paterna (surname)
- Palermo (surname)
