= Cabrini Boulevard =

Street in Upper Manhattan, New York

Coordinates: 40°51′16.18″N 73°56′19.69″W

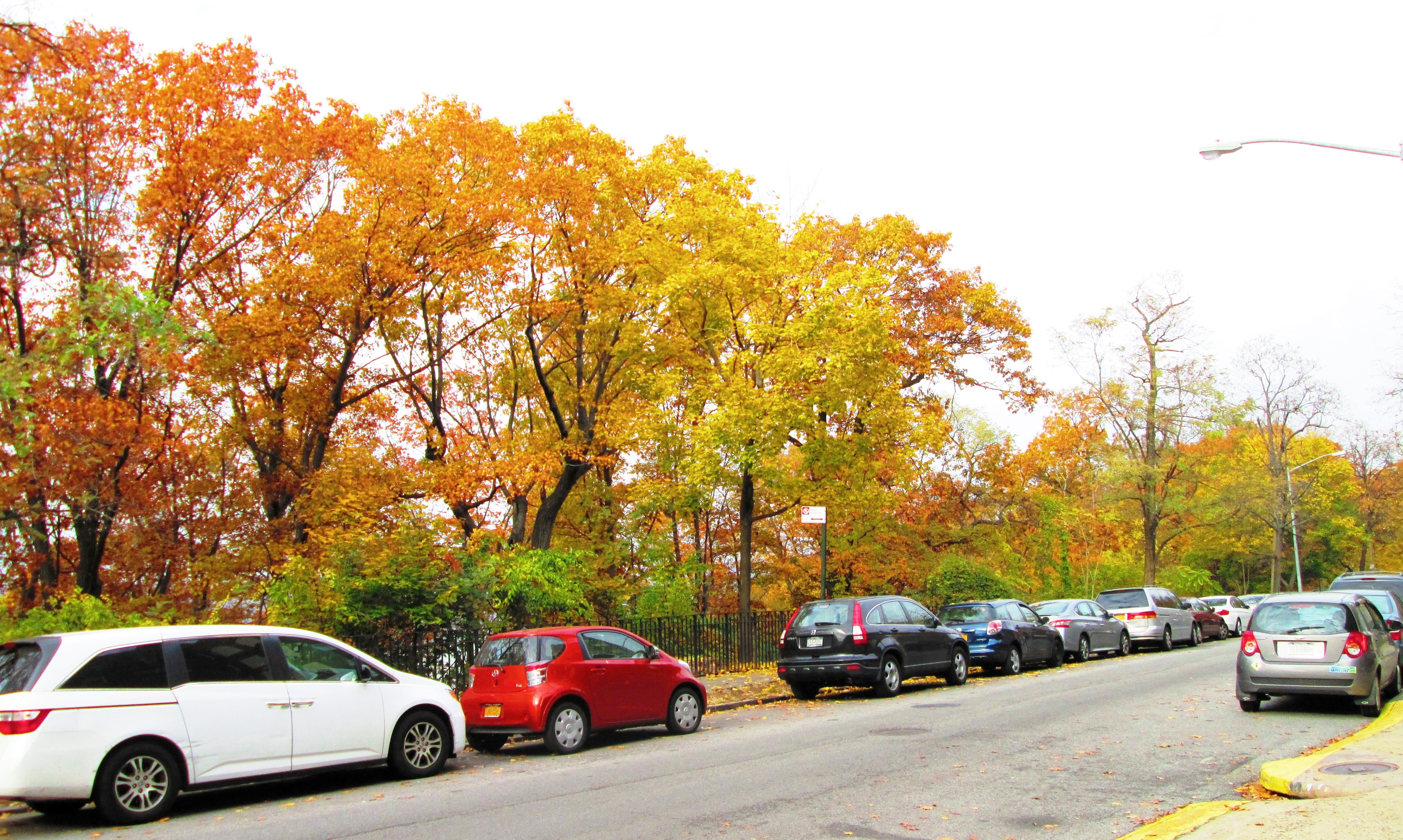
Fall foliage in the Cabrini Woods section of Fort Tryon Park along the upper portion of Cabrini Boulevard

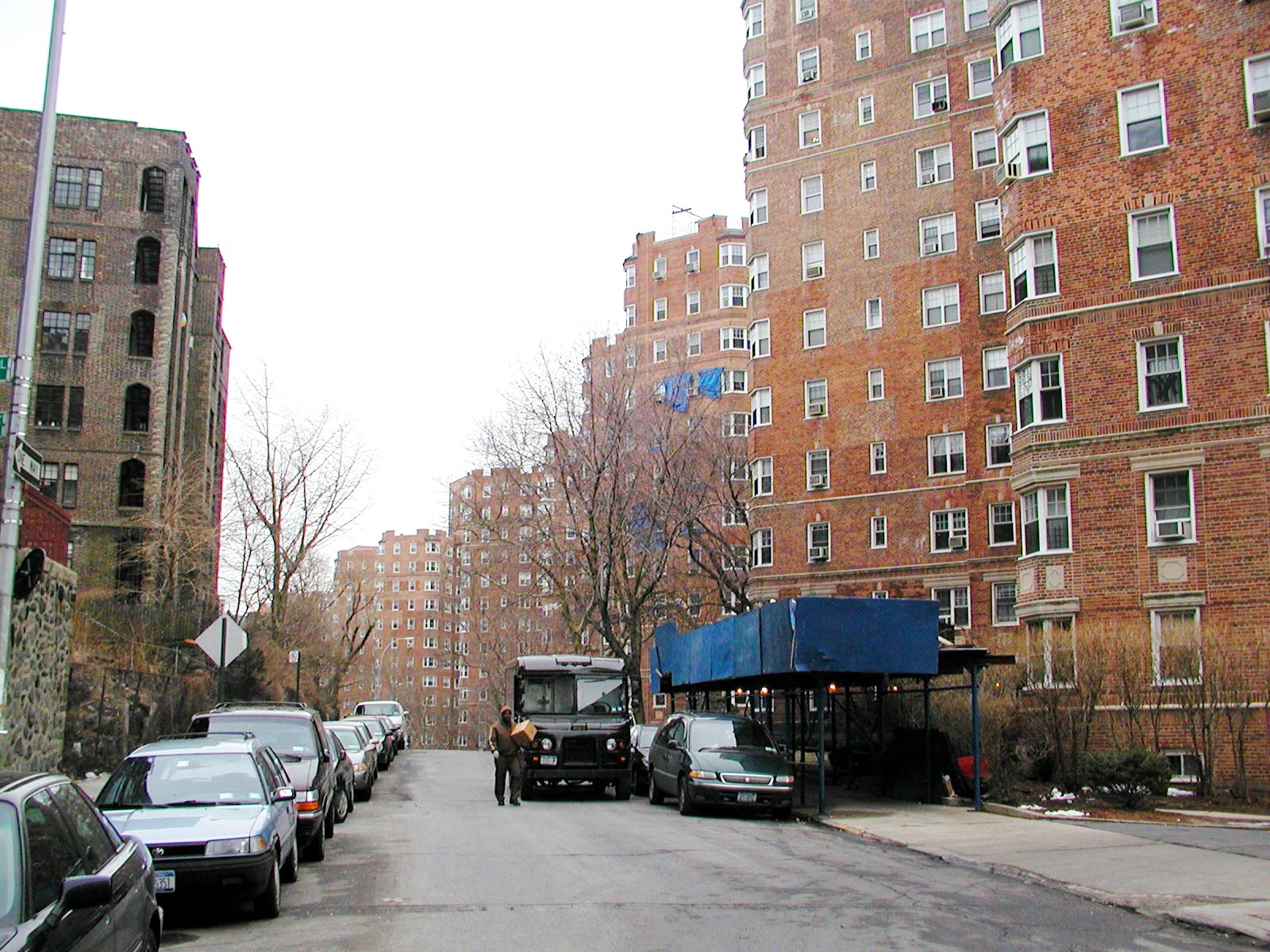
Cabrini Boulevard, looking south from 186th Street. Hudson View Gardens is on the left and Castle Village is on the right

Cabrini Boulevard is a street in the Hudson Heights neighborhood of Upper Manhattan, New York City. It runs from West 177th Street in the south, near the George Washington Bridge, to Fort Tryon Park in the north, along an escarpment of Manhattan schist overlooking the Henry Hudson Parkway and the Hudson River. It is the westernmost city street in the neighborhood except for a one block loop formed by Chittenden Avenue between West 186th and 187th Streets.

Cabrini Boulevard was originally named Northern Avenue, and was renamed for Frances Xavier Cabrini, the first American canonized as a Roman Catholic saint, in 1938, the year of her beatification. Part of her remains are enshrined at the St. Frances Xavier Cabrini Shrine, at 701 Fort Washington Avenue, the western entrance of which is on Cabrini Boulevard.

At its northern end, past the last building on the west side of the street, Cabrini Boulevard runs alongside the "Cabrini Woods" section of Fort Tryon Park, which has been set aside as a bird sanctuary.

Cabrini Boulevard is the site of two housing developments in New York City, both by real estate developer Charles Paterno. Hudson View Gardens, started in 1923 is one of the oldest housing cooperatives in the United States. The five tower Castle Village, from 1938, was initially a rental property, but converted to a cooperative in 1985.

On October 18, 2015, a portion of the street was co-named in honor of human rights activist Jacob Birnbaum, who lived on Cabrini Boulevard.
