= Albaladejo =

Coordinates: 38°37′5″N 2°48′22″W

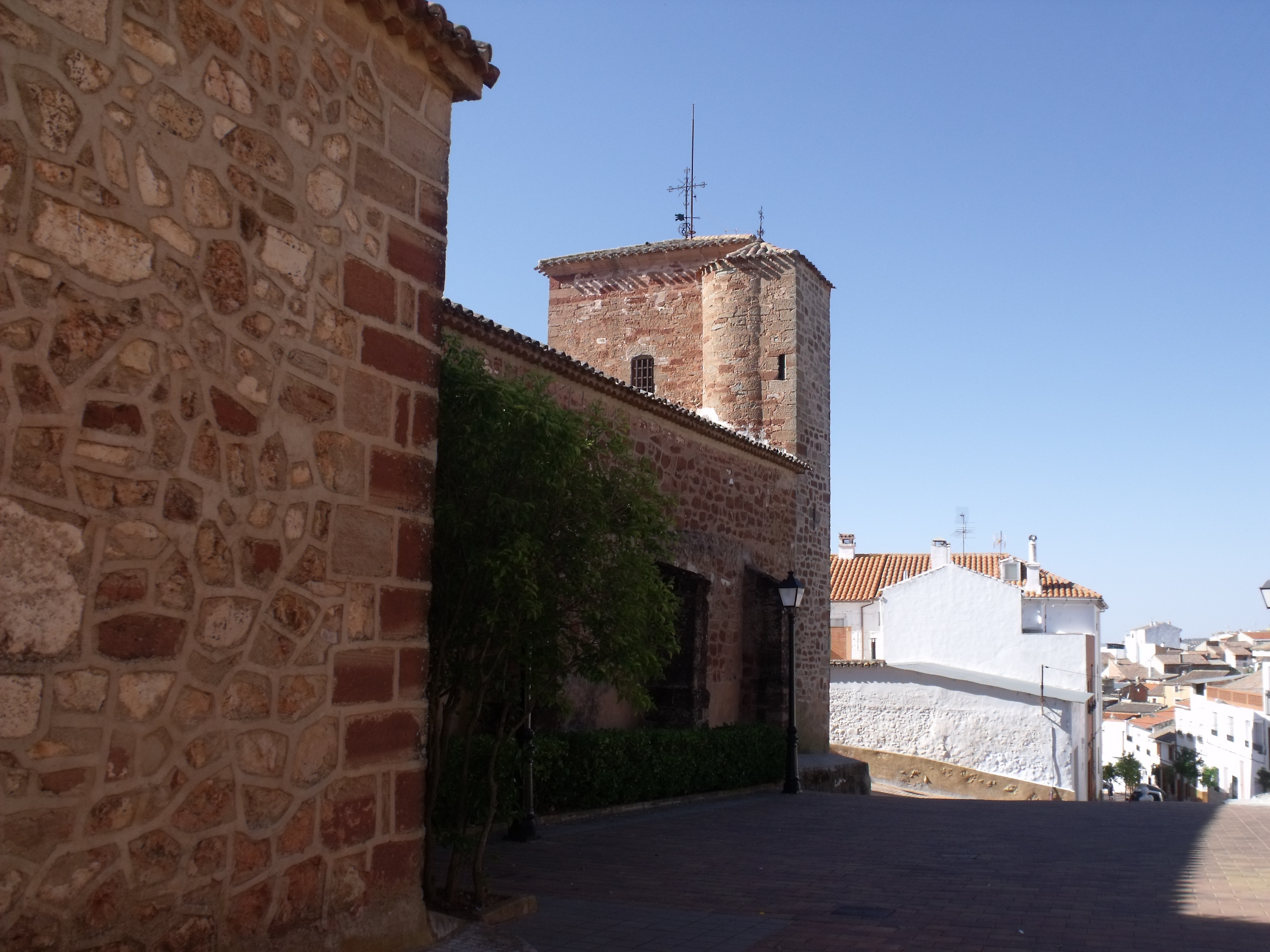
Church of Albaladejo

Flag of Albaladejo

Coat of arms of Albaladejo

Albaladejo is a village and municipality situated in the south of the province of Ciudad Real, Castile-La Mancha in Spain. Its economy is based on the textile industry, farming and on agriculture, especially olive-tree cultivation. Albaladejo has an annual celebration on the day of St. James, on the 25th of July.

Albaladejo is a Spanish municipality, located in the southeast of the province of Ciudad Real, in the autonomous community of Castilla-La Mancha and belonging to the region of Campo de Montiel.

== Geography and population ==
It has an area of 48.94 km^{2} with a population of 1,323 inhabitants (INE 2015) and a density of 28.57 inhabitants / km^{2}. It is bordering with the province of Albacete.
