= Palermo (surname) =

Palermo is an Italian surname. Notable people with the name include:

- Blinky Palermo, pseudonym of the German artist Peter Heisterkamp (1943–1977)
- Brian Palermo, American actor and comedian, and science communicator
- Felício Palermo (born 1940), Brazilian footballer
- Gianpiero D. Palermo, American andrologist
- Girolamo Palermo, American mobster
- John Palermo (born 1952), American football coach and player
- Johnny Palermo (1982–2009), American actor
- Martín Palermo (born 1973), Argentine soccer coach and player
- Olivia Palermo (born 1986), American socialite, fashion influencer, entrepreneur, model, and television personality
- Steve Palermo (1949–2017), American baseball umpire
- Tony Palermo (born 1979), American musician
- Vincent Palermo (born 1944), American mobster

== See also ==
- Palermi, another surname
- Paterna (surname), another surname
- Palermo (surname), another surname
