= Bronx Theatre High School =

Public school in New York City

Coordinates: 40°52′39″N 73°54′49″W

Location
- 99 Terrace View Avenue, 7th Floor, Bronx, NY 10463

Information
- Established: 2003
- School number: X546
- Principal: Daniel Albetta

Bronx Theatre High School is a high school in New York City, on the border of the Marble Hill neighborhood of Manhattan and the Spuyten Duyvil neighborhood of the Bronx. It is currently a small school located within the John F. Kennedy High School building (99 Terrace View Avenue, 7th Floor, Bronx, NY 10463). The enrollment is about 435 students. A large proportion of these students are women, approximately 70%.

== History ==
The school was opened in September 2003 under the leadership of Principal Debi Effinger in collaboration with the Roundabout Theater Company. The first freshman class entered with an estimated 100 kids. These students were the first graduating class of Bronx Theatre High School in the spring of 2007.

== Curriculum ==
Along with required academic classes (Math, English, Science, and History), Bronx Theatre High School offers theatre arts classes such as acting, costume design, set design, and theatre business.
