= John F. Kennedy High School (New York City) =

Public school in New York City

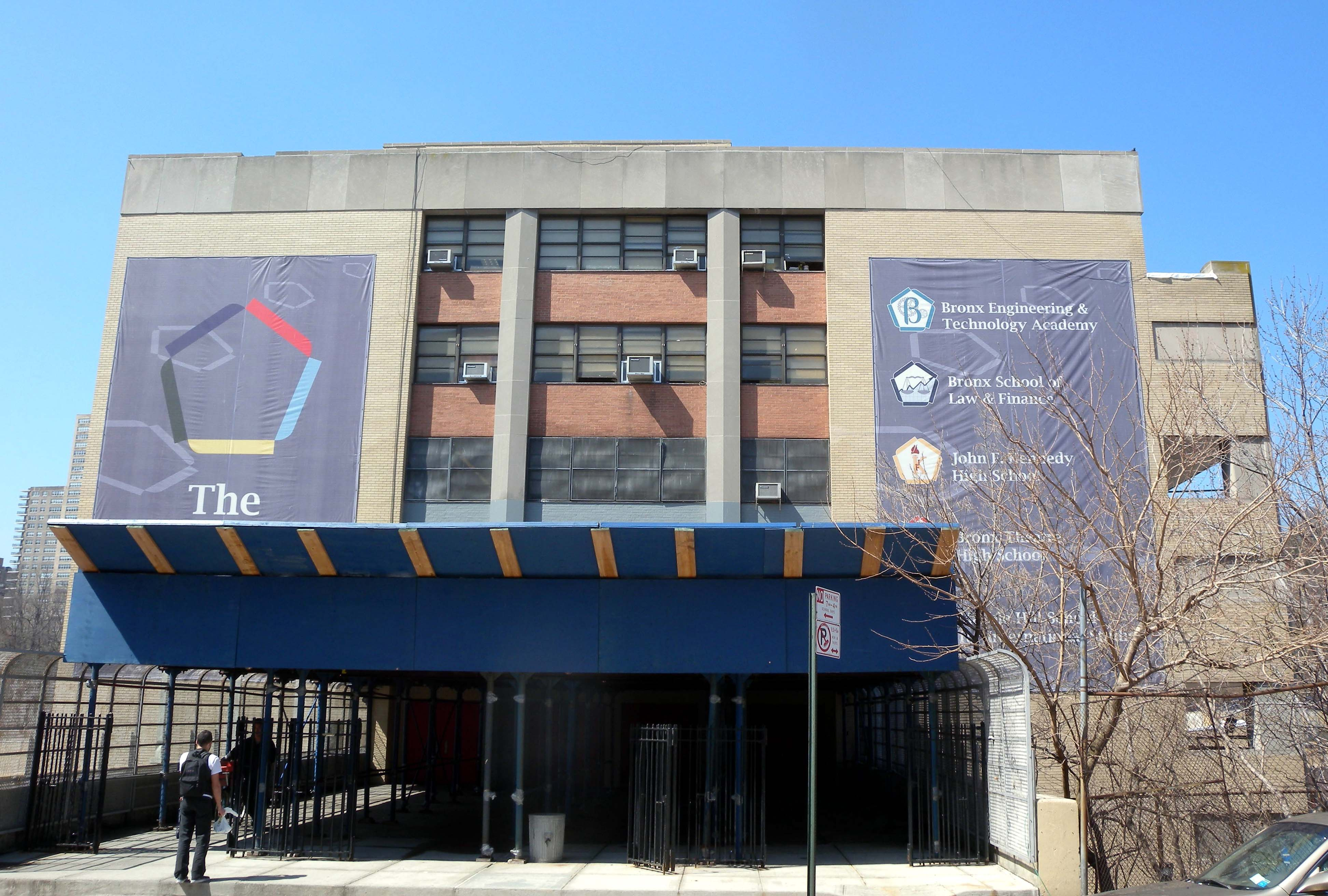
- The Marble Hill Entrance to the JFK campus (2009)

Location
- 99 Terrace View Avenue; Bronx, New York 10463; United States; 40°52′39″N 73°54′49″W

Information
- Type: Public
- Established: September 11, 1972
- Status: Serves as John F. Kennedy Educational Campus (seven co-located high schools, none named for JFK)
- Closed: 2014 (as JFK High School)
- Grades: 9-12
- Team name: Knights

John F. Kennedy High School was a four-year comprehensive New York City public high school, opened in 1972 and graduating its final class in 2014. The building and associated facilities currently operates as John F. Kennedy Educational Campus, housing five public high schools and two charter high schools. The campus serves grades 9–12 and is operated by the New York City Department of Education. The campus is located at 99 Terrace View Avenue, straddling the border of the Spuyten Duyvil neighborhood of the Bronx and the Marble Hill neighborhood of Manhattan.

JFK High school is known as one of the most successful Public Schools Athletic programs in New York City. The male sports teams' mascot is the Knight and the female's is the Flame. The school has won 37 Public Schools Athletic League championships as of 2011, including titles in basketball, football, volleyball, gymnastics, and track and field.

Notable alumni include American politicians, hip-hop legends, and professional sport stars.

== Location ==
John F. Kennedy Campus is located along the north–south border of the Bronx and Manhattan, the eastern half of the campus within Marble Hill, and the western half in Spuyten Duyvil, with the Hudson Line of the Metro-North Railroad and Spuyten Duyvil Creek to the south. Marble Hill is politically and legally part of Manhattan, but geographically within the Bronx. The school was built as part of an "educational park" along with PS/MS 37 and In-Tech Academy (MS/HS 368) to the north. The high school building was built to serve 4,000 students and is eight-stories high, but is depressed from the surrounding neighborhoods in the former creek riverbed. Entrance to the building is via a pedestrian bridge at the fourth floor, leading east to Terrace View Avenue in Marble Hill. A second bridge on the west side of the school to Spuyten Duyvil was originally planned, but never built. The other access point is at West 230th Street and Tibbett Avenue at the north end of the educational park, leading to a first floor entrance. The building features a large 22,000-volume library, several gymnasiums, and numerous industrial arts shops. The building also features several escalators and elevator banks. The roof of the school features solar panels, which provide five percent of the structure's electricity. Several portable buildings are located at the north end of the building, used for security offices and extra classrooms. At the south end of the campus near the shore is the athletic complex, featuring a football field circumscribed by a .25-mile (0.40 km) running track, a baseball field, and eight tennis courts. The football field was originally AstroTurf, but now consists of modern artificial turf. The baseball field is dirt and grass.

The campus is served by the Marble Hill–225th Street subway station, and the Marble Hill Metro-North station, both located at West 225th Street and the foot of the Broadway Bridge. The school is also served by the Bx1, Bx7, Bx9, Bx10 and Bx20 bus routes, which run along either Broadway or West 231st Street near the campus.

== History ==
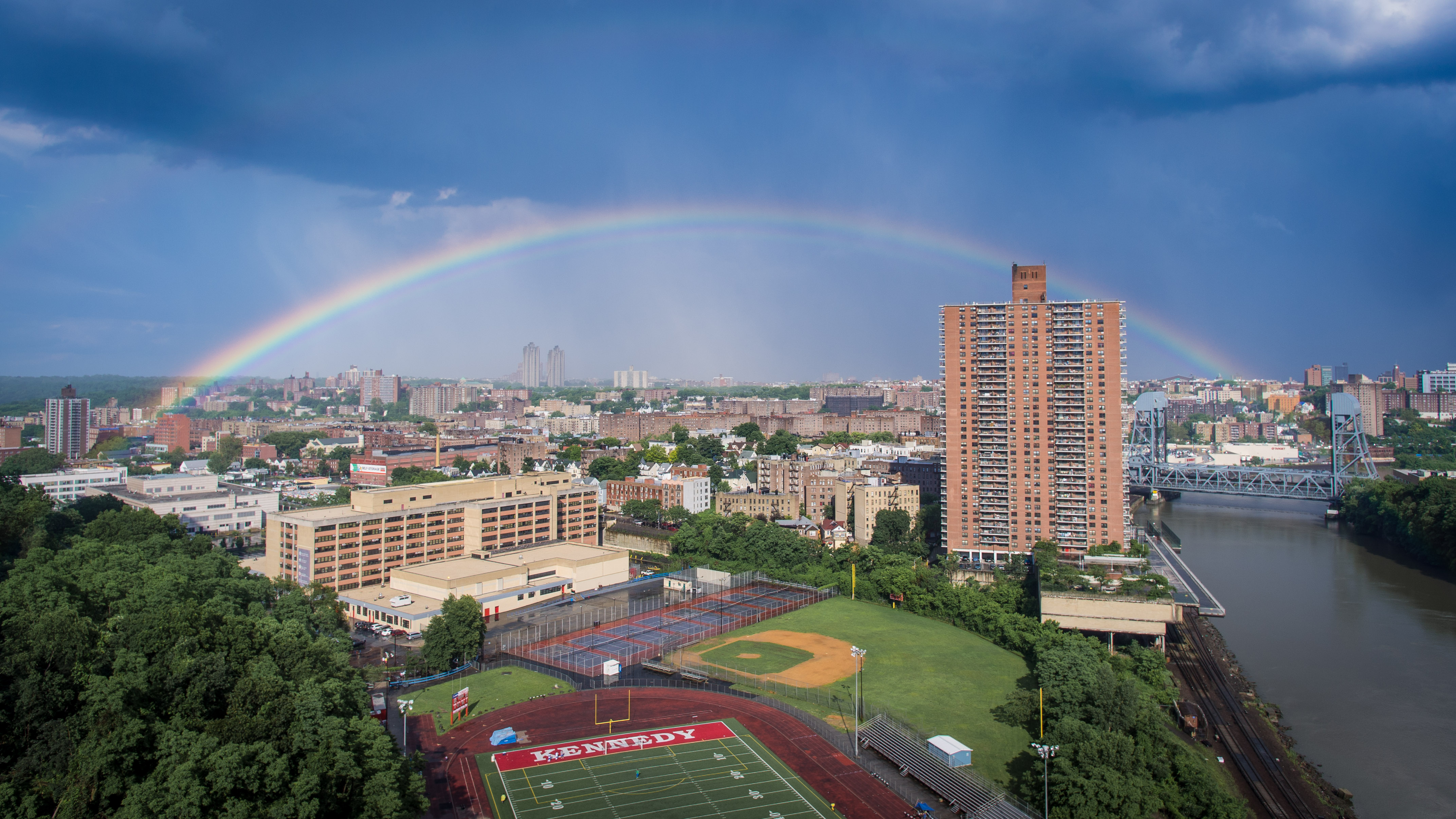
A view in 2012 of the Kennedy Campus (bottom left) and athletic fields (bottom center).

Prior to the 20th century, the site of John F. Kennedy High School was part of the course of Spuyten Duyvil Creek which separated Manhattan and the Bronx, while Marble Hill was geographically part of Manhattan. Tibbett Avenue was originally the right-of-way of Tibbetts Brook, which merged with the creek at approximately West 230th Street. In 1895, the Harlem River Ship Canal was dug between Marble Hill and the rest of Manhattan, and in 1914 the original creek routing was filled in. The land was later used as a freight spur called Kingsbridge Yard by the New York Central Railroad, as part of the Spuyten Duyvil and Port Morris Railroad.

In the mid-1960s, the city proposed to construct John F. Kennedy High School; Harry S. Truman High School, Herbert H. Lehman High School and Adlai E. Stevenson High School in eastern Bronx; South Shore High School in Brooklyn; and August Martin High School in Queens. Both Kennedy and Truman High Schools were planned as "educational parks", containing multiple schools in park settings, and integrating students from multiple areas and backgrounds to stave off de facto segregation within the school system. The Kennedy park would include two middle schools and other academic institutions including a planetarium, museum, and weather station, as well as a community center. The high school and park were named after President John F. Kennedy, who had resided in nearby Riverdale during his youth. The school was designed to serve students in the Northwest Bronx and Upper Manhattan, relieving overcrowding at DeWitt Clinton High School and George Washington High School. After several delays, the site was acquired by the city via condemnation in 1968, and construction began in 1969. The school opened on September 11, 1972, along with Lehman High School and Tottenville High School in Staten Island. The adjacent middle schools were completed at a later date.

In April 1982, Kennedy formed a joint arts program called "Urban Arts" with the private-Fieldston School in Riverdale. That year, a mural was created on the south side of the building facing the athletic fields. This mural has since been removed. Beginning in September 1982, Kennedy High School hosted the Phoenix House academy to educate former drug addicts. By this time the high school was overcrowded, housing nearly 5,500 students. In 1985, Kennedy was among 72 city public high schools whose performance was considered deficient. By 1995, less than 25 percent of seniors at the school graduated. The school also suffered increasing crime and gang-related activity. In 2002, the school began utilizing metal detectors following a fatal stabbing outside the school in August of that year.

Beginning in fall 2002, smaller high schools were established within the JFK campus, co-existing with Kennedy High School. Marble Hill High School was opened in September 2002. The Bronx School of Law and Finance and Bronx Theatre High School were opened in September 2003. The Bronx School for Law & Finance was opened in September 2004. The enrollment of John F. Kennedy High School began shrinking in 2004 as the small schools grew, with a target cap of 2,500 students. Results from the 2010-11 NYC School Survey were abysmally low. Over half of students who took the survey reported that their peers did not respect teachers or other students; over 70 percent of teachers reported the same; meanwhile, the school became increasingly plagued by crime and poor academic results. In late 2010, the Department of Education decided to shut John F. Kennedy by eliminating one grade per year until it graduated its last class in 2014. Crucial to the decision to close the school was the DOE's assertion that the school was underperforming, earning an overall D on its 2009-10 progress report, with an F grade for student performance. According to the DOE, four-year graduation rate at Kennedy High School was 46%, as opposed to a 63% average for the city. JFK High School graduated its final class in June 2014.

In mid-2014, solar panels were installed on the roof of the building.

On August 20, 2015, a gas explosion occurred at 8:10 p.m., damaging the fourth, fifth, and sixth floors and injuring three workers who were at the time repairing the science lab on the sixth floor.

== Sports ==
From 1972 to 2011, The Knights won 38 city championships in a variety of sports and PSAL divisions over 40 years, according to officials of the school's athletic department. This includes 21 titles won by boys' teams and 17 by girls teams.

- Boys Basketball - 2000, 2005
- Football - 1984, 1991, 1994, 1996, 2000
- Track & Field - 1978, 1981, 1982, 1985, 1986
- Tennis - 1981, 2011
- Girls Volleyball - 1979, 1980, 2002, 2004, 2006

== Current schools ==
Seven specialty schools – four established in 2004 and two in 2011 – are co-located on the JFK campus:

- Bronx Engineering and Technology Academy
- Bronx School of Law and Finance
- English Language Learners and International Support Preparatory Academy (ELLIS)
- Bronx Theatre High School
- Marble Hill High School for International Studies
- New Visions Charter High School for Advanced Math and Science
- New Visions Charter High School for the Humanities

== Notable alumni ==
- Bronx Style Bob (born 1965), hip hop artist
- David Britton (born 1958), basketball player for Texas A&M University who was named MVP of the 1980 Southwest Conference men's basketball tournament
- Kid Capri (born 1967), Grammy award winning DJ and rapper known for his seven seasons of Def Comedy Jam.
- Angel Estrada (born 1978), American football wide receiver and defensive back
- Stephfon Green (born 1989), American football running back who played for the Detroit Lions
- Dwight Hardy (born 1986), professional basketball player
- Karamba Janneh (born 1989), Gambian footballer
- Miguel Jimenez (born 1969), professional baseball player
- Joseline Peña-Melnyk (born 1966), is an American politician represent District 21 in and Speaker of the Maryland House of Delegates (2007–present)
- Scott Stringer (born 1960), is an American politician who served as the 44th New York City Comptroller
