= University Heights Bridge =

Bridge in New York City

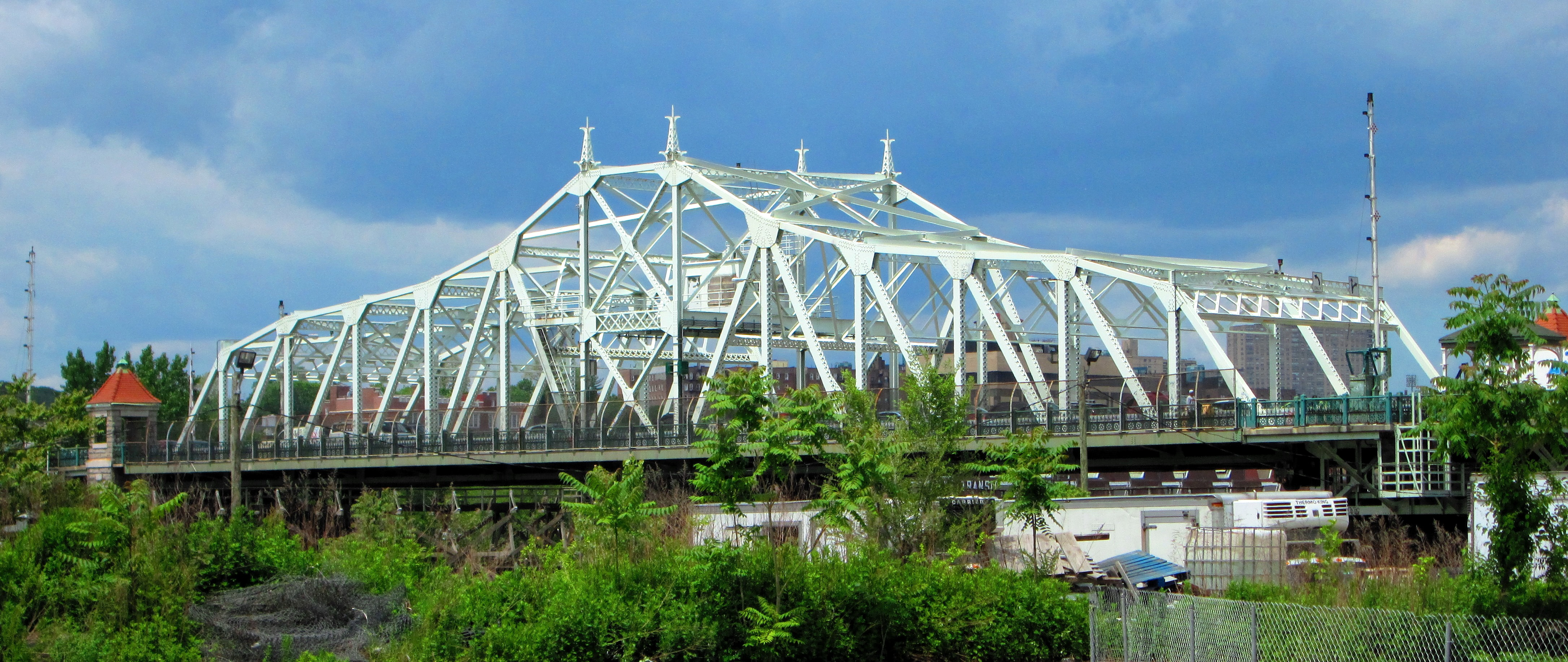
- from the University Heights Metro-North station (2014)
- Coordinates: 40°51′46″N 73°54′54″W
- Carries: 4 lanes of roadway
- Crosses: Harlem River
- Locale: Manhattan and the Bronx, New York City
- Other name: 207th Street Bridge
- Maintained by: New York City Department of Transportation

Characteristics
- Design: Swing
- Total length: 1,566 ft (477 m)
- Width: 50 ft (15 m)
- Longest span: 264 to 270 ft (80 to 82 m)

History
- Opened: 1895 (Harlem River Ship Canal); January 8, 1908 (University Heights)

Statistics
- Daily traffic: 40,078 (2016)

New York City Landmark
- Designated: September 11, 1984
- Reference no.: 1455

Location
- Interactive map of University Heights Bridge

The University Heights Bridge is a steel-truss revolving swing bridge across the Harlem River in New York City. It connects West 207th Street in the Inwood neighborhood of Manhattan with West Fordham Road in the University Heights neighborhood of the Bronx. The bridge is operated and maintained by the New York City Department of Transportation.

The bridge carries two lanes of traffic in each direction, along with a sidewalk on its southern side. The bridge has three masonry piers supporting the steel approach spans. The sidewalk features four shelters with cast-iron supports while the bridge deck has decorative iron railings and two stone pavilions.

The bridge structure was originally installed further to the north, carrying Broadway across the Harlem River Ship Canal. It opened in 1895 as the Harlem Ship Canal Bridge and was relocated southward to University Heights in 1908. Over the following decades, the University Heights Bridge carried streetcar and bus service. By the late 20th century it was in disrepair. The New York City Landmarks Preservation Commission designated the University Heights Bridge as a city landmark in 1984, and it was completely rebuilt between 1989 and 1992.

== Description ==
The University Heights Bridge, a swing bridge over the Harlem River, connects West 207th Street in Inwood, Manhattan, with West Fordham Road in University Heights, Bronx. The movable central span pivots around a small masonry island in the middle of the river. The movable section is designed as a metal truss bridge composed of numerous Howe trusses and Warren trusses. The University Heights Bridge carries the Bx12 local and Select Bus Service bus routes operated by MTA New York City Transit. Between 2000 and 2014, the bridge opened for vessels 114 times.

The bridge was designed by consulting engineer William Hubert Burr, who later became consulting engineer at several other bridge and tunnel projects, mostly in the New York City area. Burr was posthumously described as "one of the engineers who helped to raise the level of American building technology to the status of exact science". Burr also gave credit to Alfred Pancoast Boller, who was responsible for the bridge's aesthetics, and George W. Birdsall, chief engineer of the Department of Public Works. Boller had been involved in the design of several other Harlem River bridges, including the Madison Avenue Bridge and the Macombs Dam Bridge, and was also a consulting engineer or designer for numerous other bridges across the world. He had stated in 1877 that, by including ornamental detail in bridge designs, "the appearance of a roadway-bridge having sidewalks is very much enhanced, and at a very small cost." Birdsall appears to have been given ex officio credit, by virtue of his position as Public Works chief engineer.

=== Original site ===
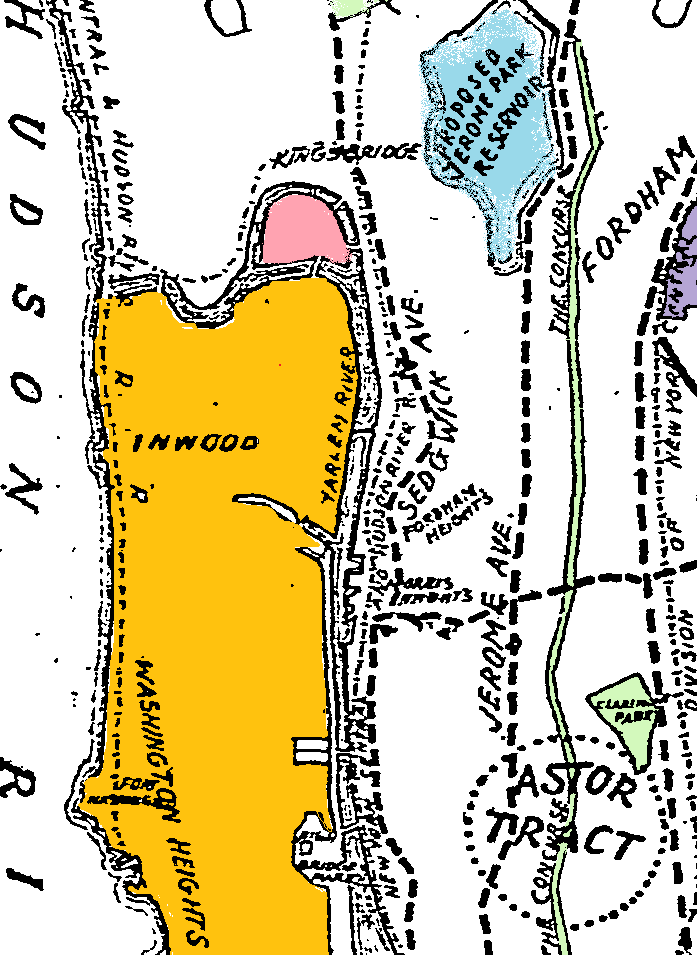
Detail from an 1896 map, showing Marble Hill (pink) as an island. The bridge originally connected Marble Hill with Inwood (orange). In 1908 the bridge was moved south, connecting Inwood with the Bronx (white) to the east.

From 1895 to 1905, the bridge structure was situated on the Harlem River Ship Canal further north, during which time it was known as the Harlem Ship Canal Bridge. It carried Broadway between the Inwood and Marble Hill neighborhoods of Manhattan. Prior to the construction of the Harlem River Ship Canal, Marble Hill was part of Manhattan Island, and the Spuyten Duyvil Creek made a tight curve around the northern shore of Marble Hill, connecting the Hudson River on the west shore of Manhattan Island with Harlem River on the east shore. Marble Hill was separated from Manhattan Island when the canal opened in 1895.

The Harlem Ship Canal Bridge measured 551 feet (168 m) from end to end, or 483 feet (147 m) excluding stone abutments. It was constructed with four sections supported by three masonry piers. The two central sections comprised the swing span, which pivoted around a small masonry island in the middle of the canal. On either side of the masonry island were navigable openings that measured 104 feet 1 inch (31.72 m) wide at mean high water. The swing span was approached by two 100-foot-long (30 m) approach structures, as well as stone abutments. The bridge had a total width of 50 feet (15 m), with a roadway of 33.5 feet (10.2 m) and two sidewalks of 8.25 feet (2.51 m). The bridge weighed 1,200 short tons (1,100 long tons; 1,100 t), with the machinery comprising one-sixth of the weight.

=== Current site ===
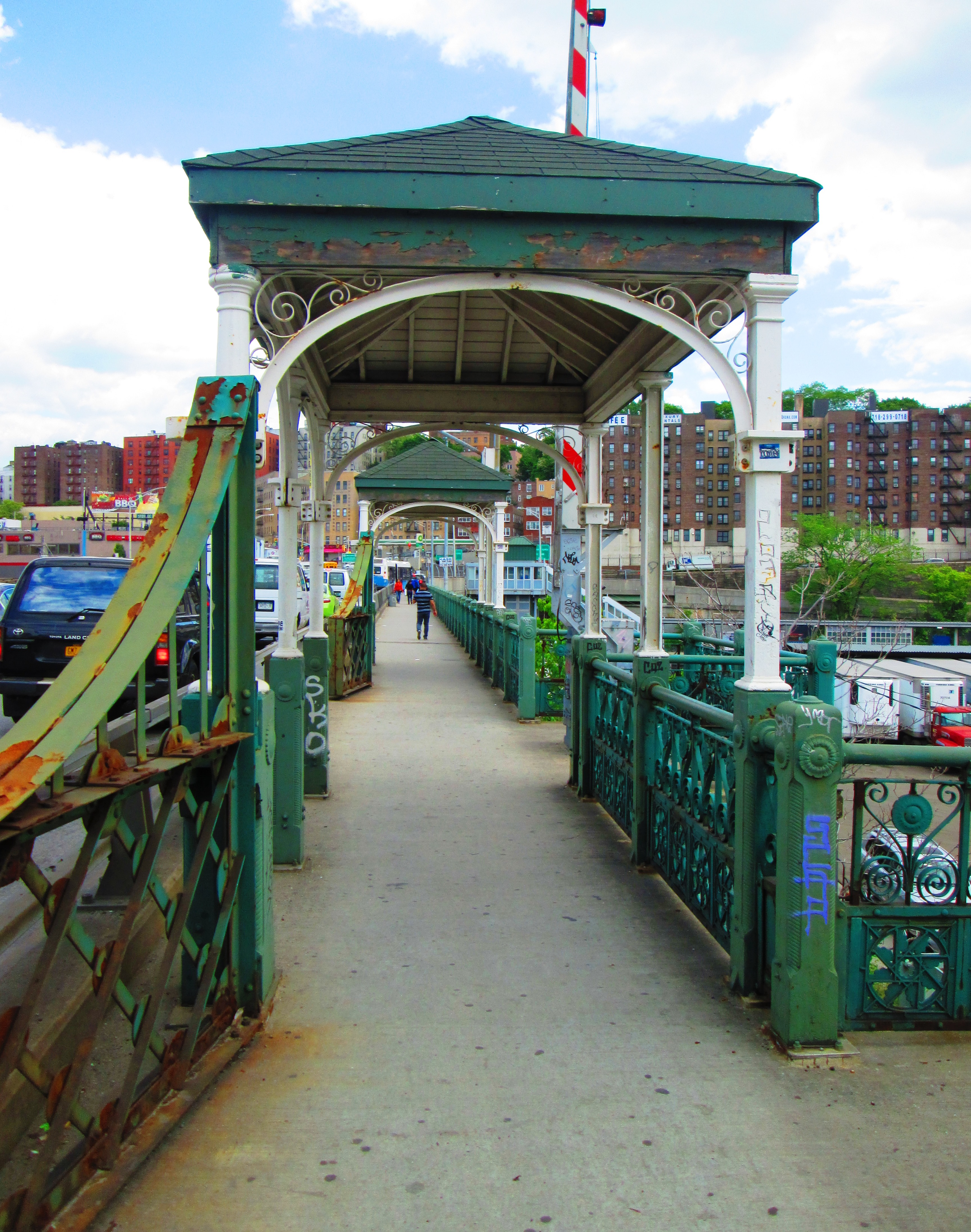
Sidewalk shelters

The University Heights Bridge is composed of five sections. The easternmost section and the two westernmost sections are fixed-deck Warren trusses, while the central sections comprise the swing span above the Harlem River. The westernmost approach span was made for the 207th Street location, while the other spans were carried over from their original Broadway location. According to the New York City Department of Transportation (NYCDOT), which maintains the bridge, its total length is 1,566 feet (477 m), including its approach spans. The bridge carries four lanes for vehicular traffic and a sidewalk on the southern side for pedestrians. The deck previously had two sidewalks, each 5.67 feet (2 m) wide. The northern sidewalk was eliminated during the 1989–1992 renovation and the southern sidewalk widened to 8 feet (2.4 m).

The swing span is variously cited as being 264 feet (80 m) or 270 feet (82 m) long. The swing span's trusswork consists of concave chords running along the top. The chords taper up toward a square section in the center of the span, which is topped by four finials. The swing span can be rotated around a tower below the center of the deck, which in turn is on the small masonry island. The rotating tower is about 50 feet (15 m) in diameter and is anchored into the bedrock beneath the Harlem River. The swing span is supported by three piers, one in the center of the river and one on each bank; these piers are made of concrete and faced with ashlar. At either end of the bridge's approach spans are concrete ramps with walls made of granite ashlar.

The western end of the bridge is at 207th Street's intersection with Ninth Avenue. At the eastern end of the bridge, an overpass crosses the Metro-North Railroad's Hudson Line, and an entrance to the line's University Heights station leads from the sidewalk. The overpass continues as Fordham Road, which intersects with the on- and off-ramps of Interstate 87 (I-87), the Major Deegan Expressway.

On either bank of the river is an iron, copper, and stone shelter house with a red tile roof. The shelter house on the east bank is north of the roadway, while that on the west bank is south of the roadway. There are drawbridge gates near these end piers, blocking off access to the swing span when it is open for maritime traffic. Many of the original railings have been replaced. The bridge's sidewalk contains four pergolas or shelters, two on each bank of the river. The pergolas each consist of six cast-iron columns with elliptical wrought-iron arches, as well as hip roofs with copper shingles.

== History ==
As a result of the River and Harbor Act, passed by the United States Congress in 1890, bridges on the Harlem River with low vertical clearance were to be replaced with those with at least 24 feet (7.3 m) of clearance during mean high water springs. Drawbridges and swing spans were determined to be most suitable for this purpose. In 1891, a wooden pedestrian drawbridge was constructed between 207th Street in Manhattan and Fordham Road in the Bronx.

To the north, the New York City Department of Public Works was commissioned in 1892 to build the Harlem Ship Canal Bridge between Inwood and Marble Hill, carrying Broadway over the new canal. This bridge was designed by Burr, Boller, and Birdsall, and constructed by A. McMullen & Co. The bridge opened on January 1, 1895. At the time, it was one of several swing bridges that had been built on the Harlem River, and it was the second oldest major bridge in New York City behind the Brooklyn Bridge.

=== Relocation from Broadway ===
By the first decade of the 20th century, the city sold the Harlem Ship Canal Bridge to the Interborough Rapid Transit Company (IRT), which was constructing the New York City Subway's first line. A branch of the line was to cross the Harlem Ship Canal above Broadway, which involved modifying or replacing the existing bridge. Ultimately, the IRT determined the existing structure could not support the elevated subway line, choosing instead to build the double-decker Broadway Bridge. The need to replace the bridge was further emphasized when, in 1903, the New York State Legislature passed legislation allowing the realignment of the New York Central Railroad's Spuyten Duyvil Line (now the Metro-North Railroad's Hudson Line) along the Harlem River's eastern bank. The railroad wished to avoid a grade crossing with the Metropolitan Street Railway's streetcar tracks on the replacement Broadway Bridge.

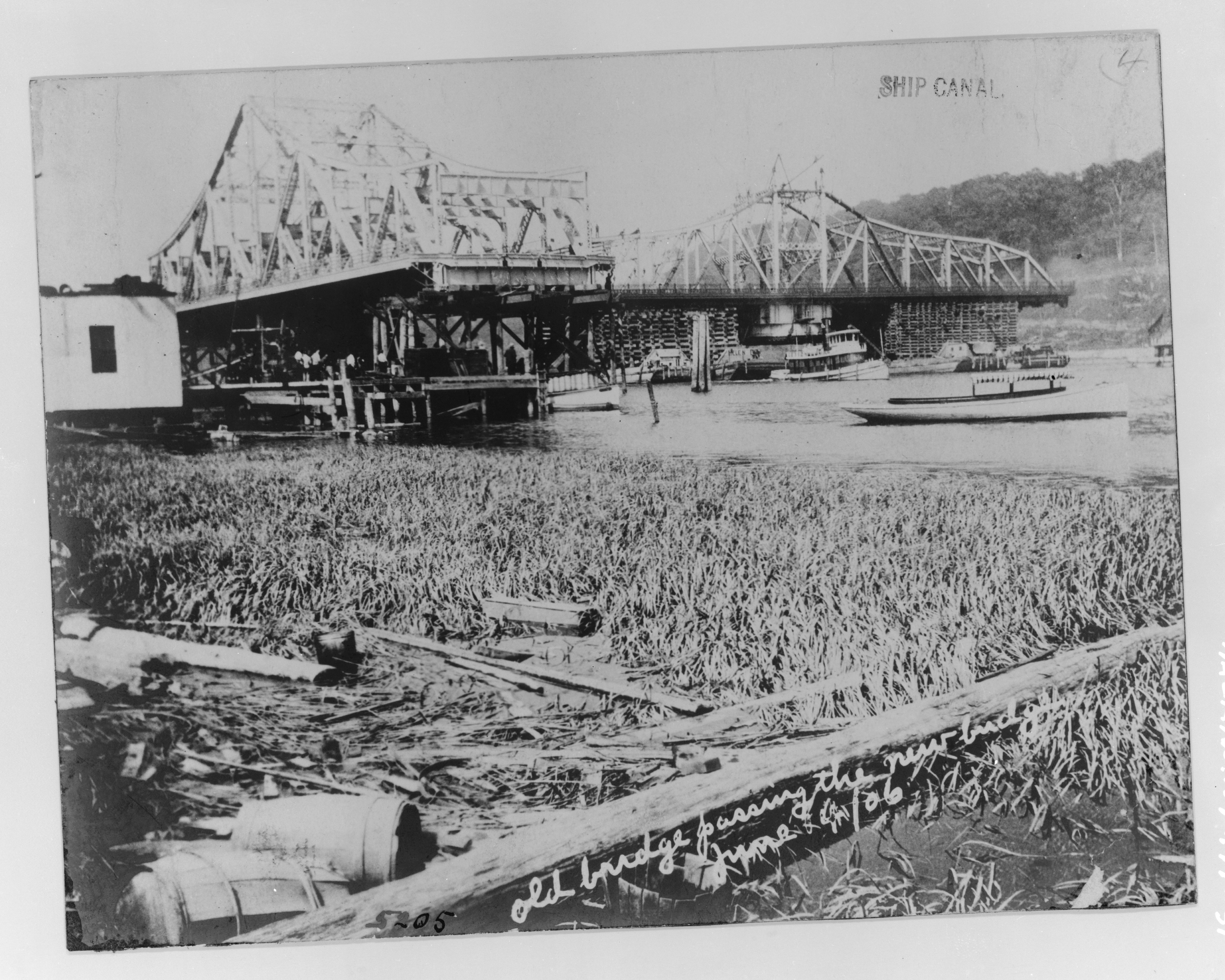
Relocation of the bridge in June 1906

In 1903, bridge engineer Gustav Lindenthal suggested constructing a bridge from University Heights in the Bronx to Inwood in Manhattan. An early proposal called for a 2,600-foot-long (790 m), 80-foot-wide (24 m) bridge from 184th Street (now Fordham Road) in the Bronx to 210th Street in Manhattan. However, that span was reduced to 1,250 feet (380 m) long and 50 feet (15 m) wide to save money. The city suggested that the Harlem Ship Canal Bridge could be relocated for that purpose. Ultimately, the city made an agreement with the three railroads to relocate the first span down the Harlem River, only ten years after it had been constructed. The Board of Estimate authorized the Commissioner of Bridges to repurchase the bridge from the IRT. Accordingly, the spans of the old Harlem Ship Canal Bridge were replaced with the new double-decker spans in three phases. After the old spans were disconnected from their old location and moved aside, the corresponding sections of the new Broadway Bridge were floated into place. The southern approach at Broadway was replaced in October 1905, followed by the northern approach in November.

At 207th Street, the Foundation and Contracting Company started constructing the pier at the center of the river in November 1903, completing it ten months later. The relocated bridge, initially slated to be known as the Fordham Heights Bridge, was formally renamed the University Heights Bridge in May 1904. The Snare & Triest Company was hired in 1905 to perform additional work on the relocated bridge's approaches, as well as construct an additional span for the western approach. The same year, the Department of Bridges issued $821,215 in capital stock to fund the relocation. The existing spans underwent major modifications before being installed at 207th Street. The Harlem Ship Canal Bridge's southern approach was towed by barges to 207th Street in May 1906 and reinstalled as the University Heights Bridge's western approach. The following month, the swing span was towed from its Broadway location and lifted onto the new pivot pier at 207th Street. In November 1907, the old northern approach was towed to Fordham Road and reinstalled as the University Heights Bridge's eastern approach. The relocation was conducted under the supervision of chief engineer Othniel F. Nichols. The bridge reopened to traffic on January 8, 1908.

=== Usage ===
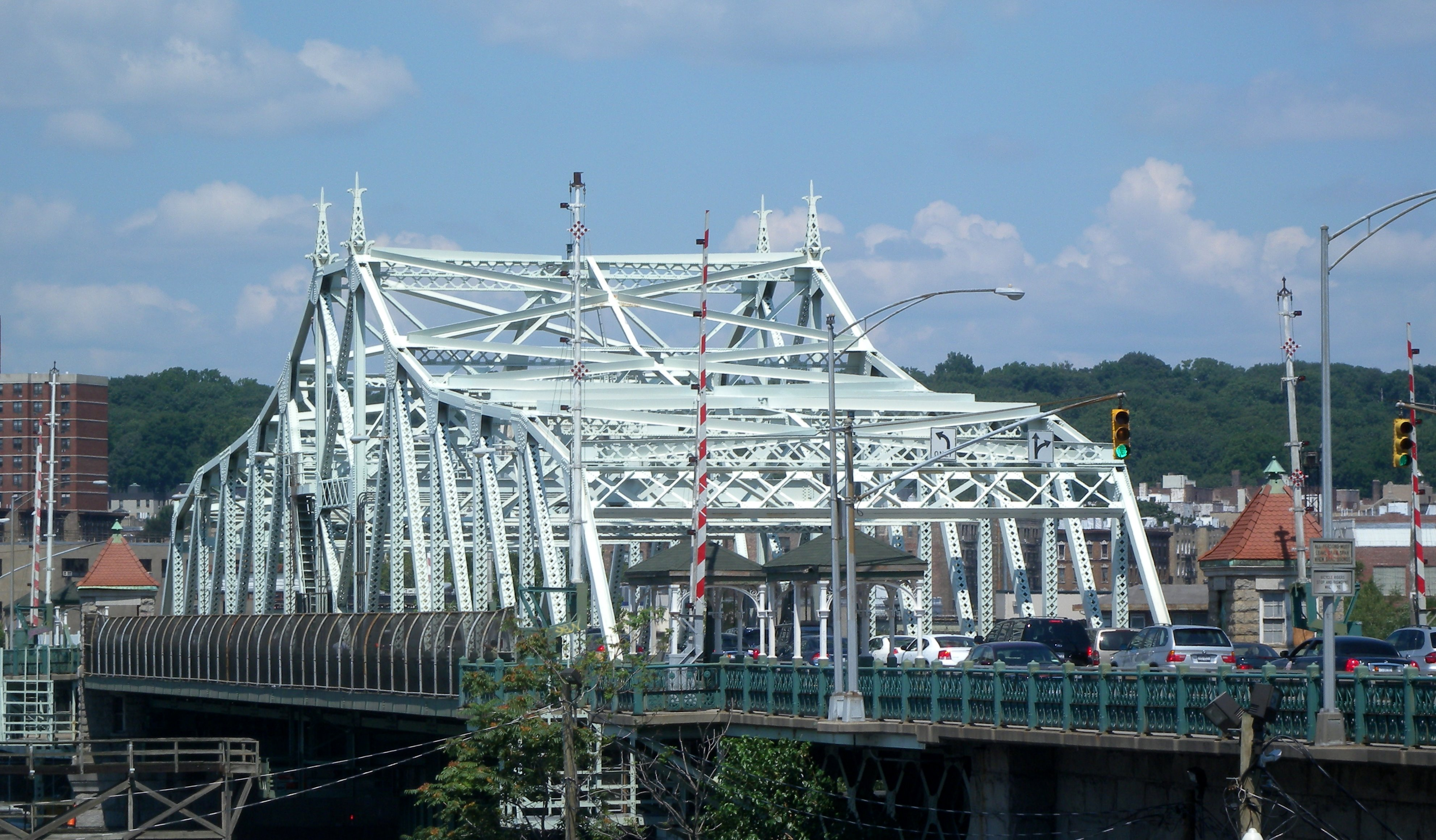
View from the east

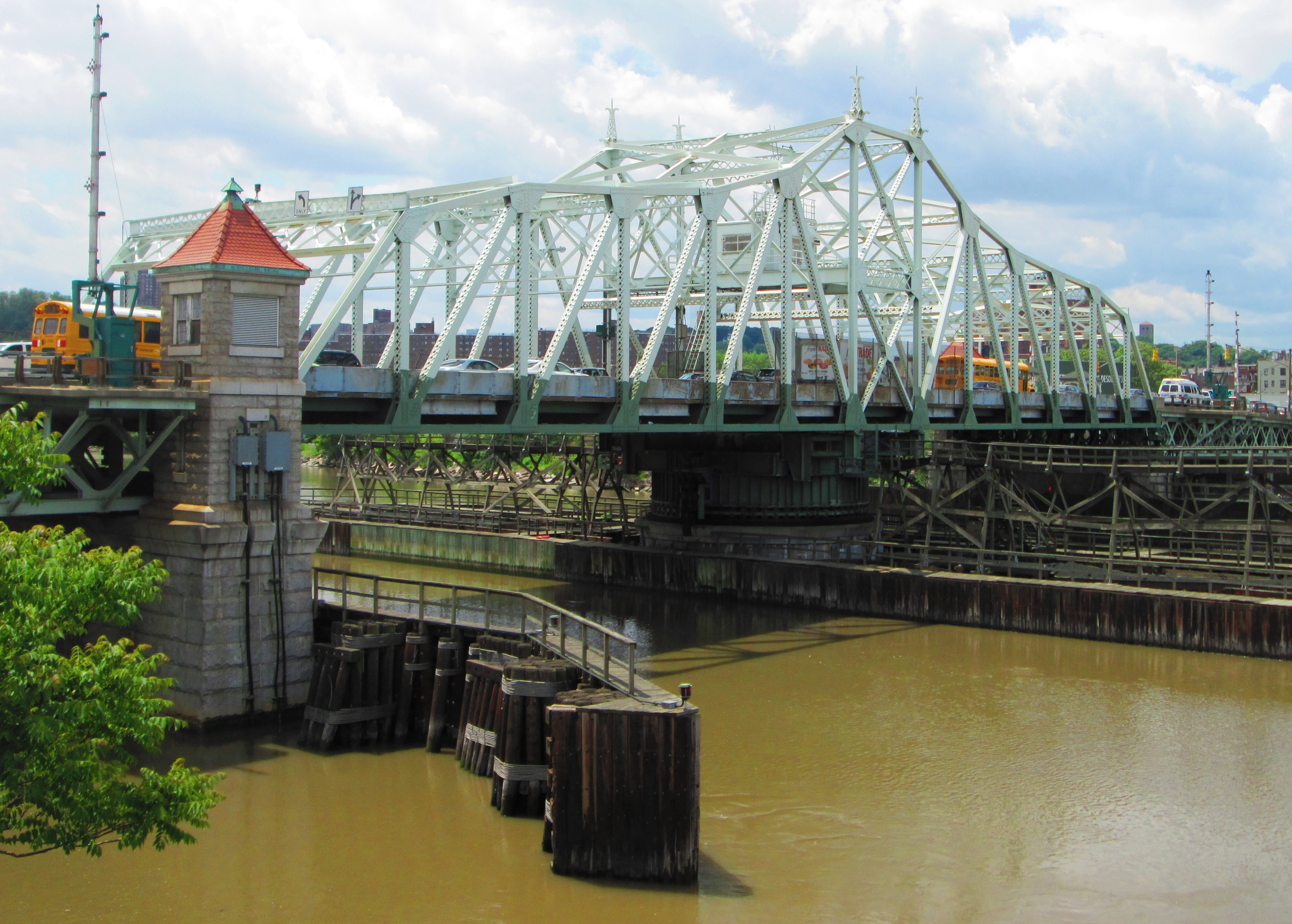
View from the north

The Union Railway Company planned to extend their Fordham Road streetcar line from the Bronx to Manhattan when the bridge was announced. By late 1908, after the opening of the bridge, the Union Railway applied for permission for a Manhattan extension. After the permission was granted, streetcar service across the bridge began in November 1910. The bridge was designated as part of U.S. Route 9X in December 1934, which was redesignated as New York State Route 9X shortly afterward. The highway designation was deleted in the 1940s. The Fordham Road streetcar service was replaced with the Bx19 bus, later the Bx12 bus, in 1948. The next year, the deck was replaced and the streetcar tracks were removed. A freestanding gantry for the streetcar's electric wires remained on the swing span's eastern end through the 1980s.

Mayor John Lindsay proposed enacting tolls along the University Heights Bridge, as well as all other free bridges across the East and Harlem rivers, in 1971. The proposal failed in 1977 after the United States Congress moved to ban tolls on these bridges. The city and state were planning to restore or replace the bridge by the 1980s. A $1.25 billion bond issue, proposed in 1983, had provided $15 million for the bridge's rehabilitation. The Landmarks Preservation Commission held a hearing to designate the crossing as an official city landmark, which would mandate that any bridge replacement would have to conform with the original design. Manhattan Community Board 12 voted against the landmark designation and the city and state governments advised against designating the bridge as a landmark. Despite the opposition, on September 11, 1984, the bridge was designated a city landmark.

The bridge's condition continued to deteriorate; in late 1987, vehicles weighing over 15 short tons (13 long tons; 14 t) were banned from crossing the bridge, and wheelchair-accessible buses were swapped with lighter, non-accessible buses. By 1988, the deck contained several holes and was supported by corroded steel beams. The NYCDOT estimated that it would cost $24 million to fix the corroded approach viaduct, and the New York State Department of Transportation received a $34.3 million low bid for the bridge's reconstruction that year. The replacement of the deteriorated structure was a high priority for residents of University Heights. The bridge was entirely reconstructed starting in 1989, with a budgeted cost of $35 million. Because of the bridge's landmark status, the replacement latticework had to be built in the same design as in the old span. Mechanical and electrical equipment was also replaced, and the northern sidewalk was removed. Reconstruction was performed in three phases: the southern portions of the approach viaducts were renovated first, followed by the swing span and the northern portions of the approaches. The bridge reopened on February 18, 1992. The Fordham Road overpass was renovated starting the same year. The work was supposed to be finished in 1995 but was delayed by two years because of a lack of coordination with other government agencies, which were renovating the University Heights station and the I-87 exit and entrance ramps.

On June 12, 2008, the New York City Bridge Centennial Commission organized a parade to mark the centennial of the bridge. The event was attended by Bronx Borough President Adolfo Carrión, Jr. and Manhattan Borough President Scott Stringer. The celebration was the commission's first such event.

== Critical reception ==
Architectural critic Montgomery Schuyler stated that the Macombs Dam and University Heights Bridges were "highly creditable works, in an artistic as well as in a scientific sense." The University Heights Bridge was also described by Engineering Magazine in 1909 as "probably the prettiest of the swing bridges".

== See also ==
- List of bridges documented by the Historic American Engineering Record in New York
- List of New York City Designated Landmarks in Manhattan above 110th Street
- List of New York City Designated Landmarks in the Bronx
