= New York State Route 9X =

Former state highway in New York State

New York State Route 9X
- NY 9X highlighted in red

Route information
- Auxiliary route of US 9
- Maintained by NYSDH
- Length: 1.83 mi (2.95 km)
- Existed: April 1935–1940s

Major junctions
- South end: US 9 in Inwood
- North end: US 9 in Kingsbridge

Location
- Country: United States
- State: New York
- Counties: New York, Bronx

Highway system
- New York Highways; Interstate; US; State; Reference; Parkways
← US 9W	→ NY 10

New York State Route 9X (NY 9X) was a 1.83-mile-long (2.95 km) state highway located within New York City. It served as an alternate route of U.S. Route 9 (US 9) through Manhattan and the Bronx. The southern terminus of the route was in the Manhattan neighborhood of Inwood; its northern terminus was in the Bronx neighborhood of Kingsbridge. NY 9X was assigned in April 1935; however, the road had been signed as a numbered highway since 1934. The designation was removed entirely in the 1940s.

== Route description ==
NY 9X began at the intersection of West 207th Street and Broadway (US 9) in the Manhattan neighborhood of Inwood. The route headed to the southeast, following 207th Street for five blocks through Inwood prior to crossing over the Harlem River on the University Heights Bridge. On the opposite side of the river in the Bronx, within the community of University Heights, NY 9X became Fordham Road and continued east to a junction with Sedgwick Avenue. While Fordham Road continued on to meet US 1, located just three blocks to the east, NY 9X turned north to follow Sedgwick Avenue along the Harlem River.

The route changed streets again just two blocks later as it veered onto Bailey Avenue, another north–south street that continued Sedgwick Avenue's course along the riverside. NY 9X proceeded north along the Harlem River to the Kingsbridge neighborhood, where the river turned westward to delimit the northern edge of Manhattan. The route remained on a northward course until West 230th Street, where it turned west for one block to rejoin US 9 at an intersection with Broadway. NY 9X ended at this point, located just 1 mile (1.6 km) northeast of where the route began in Inwood.

== History ==
Although US 9 was signed in the state of New York in 1927, it, like all other routes within the New York City limits, was not signed within the city until 1934. In mid-December of that year, US 9, as well as several other routes that passed through the city limits (such as US 1), were posted in New York City for the first time. Several routes were also extended into the city or created within the city limits, including US 9X, an alternate route of US 9 through northern Manhattan and the lower Bronx along 207th Street, Bailey Avenue, and 230th Street. Although the termini of the route never changed, it was redesignated as NY 9X in April 1935, before being removed completely in the 1940s.

== Major intersections ==
Borough	Location	mi	km	Destinations	Notes
Manhattan	Inwood	0.00	0.00	US 9 (Broadway)	
The Bronx	University Heights	0.84	1.35	West Fordham Road	Connection to US 1 three blocks east
The Bronx	Kingsbridge	1.83	2.95	US 9 (Broadway)	
1.000 mi = 1.609 km; 1.000 km = 0.621 mi
