= Angel Estrada =

American football player (born 1978)

Angel Estrada (born March 12, 1978, from Bronx, New York) is a former American football wide receiver and defensive back for the New York Dragons of the Arena Football League. He played college football at West Virginia University.

== High school ==
Estrada attended John F. Kennedy High School in Bronx, New York and was a letterman in football and baseball.

== Collegiate career ==
Angel Estrada attended Nassau Community College in 2000, where he earned Junior College All-American honors.

Estrada attended West Virginia University after junior college, where became a walk-on and earned his scholarship before starting at safety the rest of his career. As a junior, Estrada earned second team All-Big East honors and earned first-team honors as a senior after grabbing two interceptions in 2002.

== Professional career ==
=== NIFL ===
After college, Estrada worked as a residential counselor in Boston. He then joined the National Indoor Football League with the Ohio Valley Greyhounds for a season, where he led the league with 14 interceptions and totaled 425 yards on 30 receptions and 12 touchdowns.

Awards:

- Rookie of the Year from the Greyhounds
- NIFL Defensive MVP
- NIFL All-star

=== Nashville Kats ===
After his season in the Indoor League, Estrada joined the Arena Football League with the Nashville Kats for his rookie season. He started all three games he played in, recording his first career interception against the New York Dragons, where he finished out the season.

=== New York Dragons ===
After ending his rookie season with the New York Dragons, Estrada finished his second season in the AFL with 32 tackles, two forced fumbles and an interception.

=== Grand Rapids Rampage ===
In 2007, Estrada played his third season with the Grand Rapids Rampage. He finished the season with 23 tackles in only five games, missing the rest due to injury.

=== Return to New York ===
For the 2008 season, Estrada returned to the New York Dragons, where he played in 2006. He was again injured but finished with 16.5 tackles, a fumble recovery, and an interception.
