= David Britton (basketball) =

American basketball player (born 1958)

Personal information
- Born: August 29, 1958 (age 68) Harlem, New York, U.S.
- Listed height: 6 ft 4 in (1.93 m)
- Listed weight: 180 lb (82 kg)

Career information
- High school: John F. Kennedy (The Bronx, New York)
- College: Potomac State (1977–1978); Texas A&M (1978–1980)
- NBA draft: 1980: 3rd round, 57th overall pick
- Drafted by: Dallas Mavericks
- Position: Point guard
- Number: 30

Career history
- 1980: Washington Bullets
- 1981: Lehigh Valley Jets
- 1981–1982: Maine Lumberjacks
- Stats at NBA.com
- Stats at Basketball Reference

David Britton (born August 26, 1958) is an American former basketball player. He played college basketball for Texas A&M University where he was named MVP of the 1980 Southwest Conference men's basketball tournament.

== Early years ==
David Britton was born in Harlem, New York at St Luke Hospital to Theodore and Verdelle Britton on August 29, 1958. He attended John F. Kennedy High School in The Bronx.

== Texas A&M University ==
At Texas A&M, Britton was a first-team all Southwest Conference player in his senior season in 1979–1980. Playing alongside "The Wall" of centers Rudy Woods and Claude Riley, and forwards Vernon Smith (basketball) and Rynn Wright, as well as point guard Dave Goff, Britton's senior team set the school record of 26 victories. They earned a place in the 1980 NCAA Tournament, beating Bradley and eking out a double-overtime victory against North Carolina before losing in overtime to eventual national champion Louisville. Britton was named to the All-Midwest Regional Team for his performance in the tournament.

== Professional career ==
The Dallas Mavericks chose Britton as the 11th pick in the third round of the 1980 NBA draft, but he did not play with the team, joining the Washington Bullets instead. He appeared in two games for the Bullets before he was waived in end of December.

== Career statistics ==
Legend
GP	Games played	GS	Games started	MPG	Minutes per game
FG%	Field goal percentage	3P%	3-point field goal percentage	FT%	Free throw percentage
RPG	Rebounds per game	APG	Assists per game	SPG	Steals per game
BPG	Blocks per game	PPG	Points per game	**Bold**	Career high

=== NBA ===
==== Regular season ====
Year	Team	GP	MPG	FG%	3P%	FT%	RPG	APG	SPG	BPG	PPG
1980–81	Washington	2	4.5	.667	–	–	1.0	1.5	.5	.0	2.0
