= Marble Hill Houses =

Public housing development in Manhattan, New York

- NYCHA Property
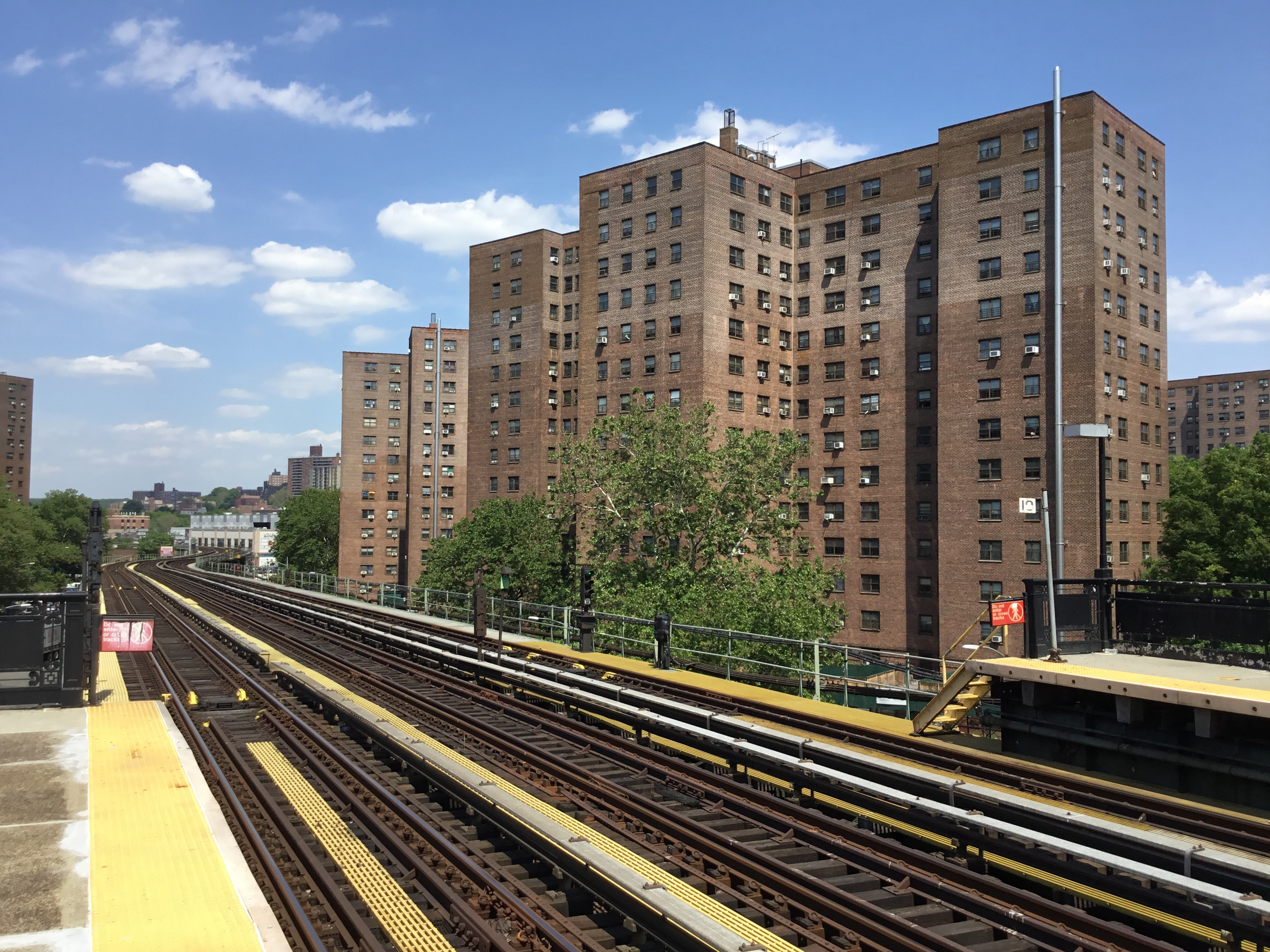
- Seen from the Marble Hill-225th Street station.
- Interactive map of Marble Hill Houses
- Country: United States
- State: New York
- City: New York City
- Borough: Manhattan

Area
  - Total: 17.27 acres (6.99 ha)

Population
  - Total: 2,975
- Zip Code: 10463

The Marble Hill Houses is NYCHA housing project that has 11 buildings with 14 and 15 stories. The first 9 buildings are located between West 225th to 230th Streets and also between Broadway and Exterior Street. Building X and XI are located between West 228th and 230th Streets and also between Marble Hill Avenue and Broadway. This housing project is in the Marble Hill neighborhood of Manhattan, and straddles the border between Manhattan and the Bronx.

== History ==
The first tenants began moving into the housing project in August 1951. Construction of the complex was completed in March 1952.

In 1955, a tablet marking the former location of the King's Bridge across Spuyten Duyvil Creek was placed on Building XI of the complex by the Kingsbridge Historical Society.

=== 21st century ===
In July 2025, NYCHA completed the installation of 6 new high-efficiency boilers for heating in space and hot water heating and scale improvements which started on late 2023 for $24.1M.

== See also ==
- New York City Housing Authority
