= Broadway Bridge (Manhattan) =

Bridge in New York City

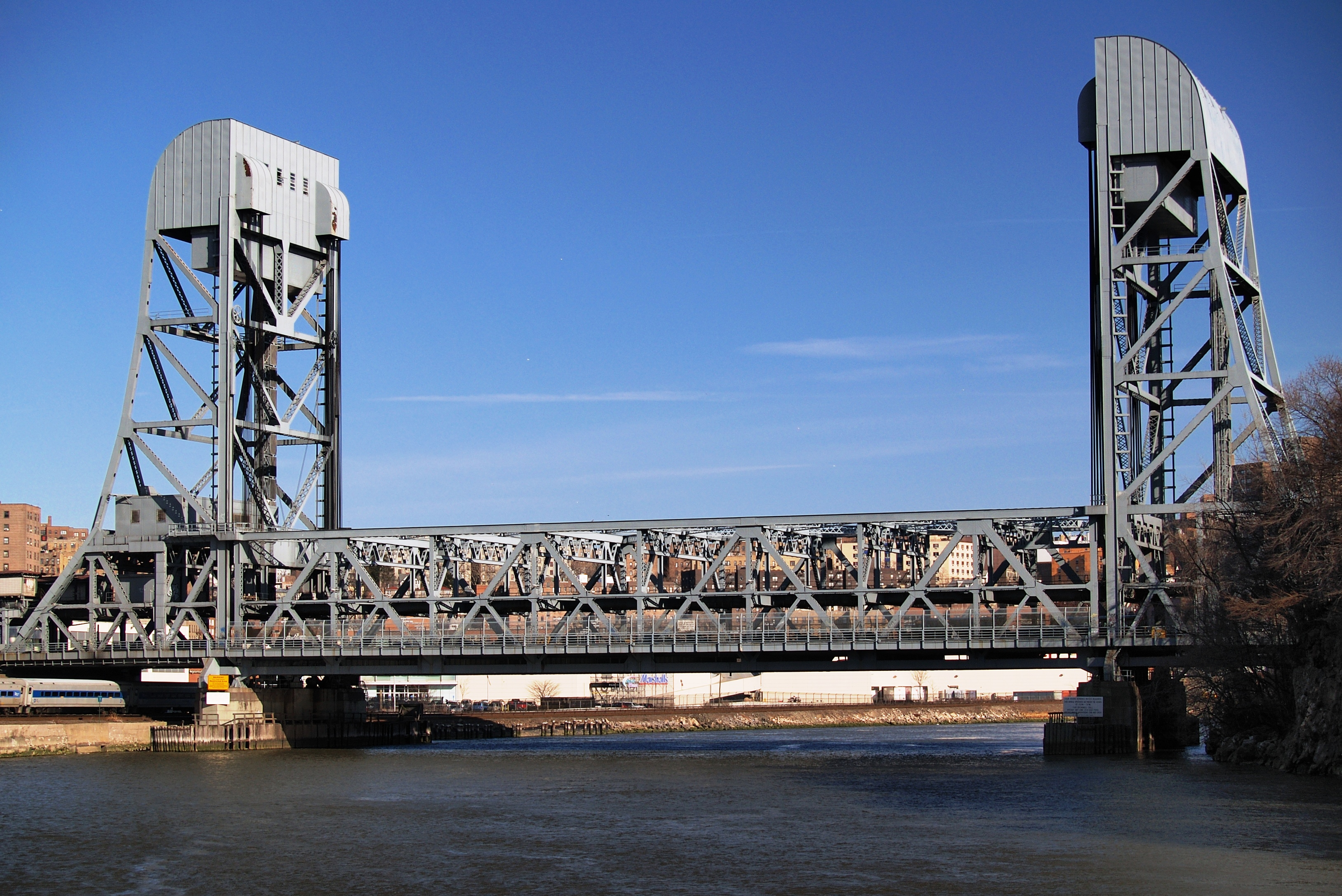
- From the west
- Coordinates: 40°52′25″N 73°54′40″W
- Carries: 6 lanes of US 9 (Broadway) (lower); 3 tracks of IRT Broadway–Seventh Avenue Line ( train) (upper)
- Crosses: Harlem River Ship Canal
- Locale: Manhattan, New York City
- Maintained by: New York City Department of Transportation

Characteristics
- Design: Double-decked vertical lift bridge
- Total length: 558 feet (170 m)
- Longest span: 304 feet (93 m)
- Clearance below: 136 feet (41 m) (raised); 25 feet (7.6 m) (lowered)

History
- Opened: Current span: December 26, 1960 (subway), January 1961 (highway)

Statistics
- Daily traffic: 36,027 (2016)

Location
- Interactive map of Broadway Bridge

The Broadway Bridge is a vertical-lift bridge across the Harlem River Ship Canal in the borough of Manhattan in New York City. It connects the neighborhoods of Inwood on Manhattan Island and Marble Hill on the mainland. The bridge consists of two decks. The lower deck carries Broadway, which is designated as U.S. Route 9 at this location. The upper deck carries the New York City Subway's IRT Broadway–Seventh Avenue Line, serving the 1 train.

The site was previously occupied by two successive swing bridges. The first, known as the Harlem Ship Canal Bridge, was built between 1893 and 1895 to cross the canal, which had been constructed to bypass a meandering alignment of the Spuyten Duyvil Creek. By the first decade of the 20th century, the construction of the city's first subway line had made the original bridge obsolete, and a double-decker span called the 225th Street Bridge was built to accommodate the subway line above highway traffic. Between 1905 and 1906, the second bridge was installed, and the first bridge was relocated southward on the Harlem River, becoming the University Heights Bridge.

The current bridge was constructed between 1957 and 1962 to replace the second span. It contains a navigable channel 304 feet (93 m) wide. The bridge provides 136 feet (41 m) of vertical clearance when it is in the open position and 25 feet (7.6 m) of vertical clearance in the closed position.

== Description ==
The Broadway Bridge is a double-deck vertical-lift bridge crossing the Harlem River Ship Canal in the New York City borough of Manhattan. It carries Broadway, also known as U.S. Route 9, on the lower level and three New York City Subway tracks on the upper level. Although the bridge serves as a route for traffic between Manhattan and the Bronx, it is entirely in Manhattan. The southern end of the bridge is in Inwood, on Manhattan Island, while the northern end is in Marble Hill, on the mainland United States. The bridge also passes over the Metro-North Railroad's Hudson Line on its northern end.

The lower level is used by the Bx7 and Bx20 local bus routes, operated by MTA New York City Transit, and the BxM1 express bus route operated by the MTA Bus Company. The subway tracks carry the Broadway–Seventh Avenue Line (1 train). Immediately to the north of the bridge along this line is the Marble Hill–225th Street station. In 2016, the New York City Department of Transportation, which operates and maintains the bridge, reported an average daily traffic volume in both directions of 36,027. The peak ADT over the Broadway Bridge was 42,555 vehicles in 1990. Between 2000 and 2014, the bridge opened for vessels 434 times.

The bridge measures 558 feet (170 m) long, including approaches. The lift span is 304 feet (93 m) long and sits 25 feet (7.6 m) above mean high water in the "closed" position, though it can be raised to 136 feet (41 m) above mean high water. It weighs 2,600 short tons (2,300 long tons; 2,400 t) and is composed of two Warren trusses. The lift span is supported by the lift towers at each end, which rise 160 feet (49 m) above mean water. The lift span is suspended by two sets of 12 wire ropes at each corner. Each rope is wrapped around counterweights on each end: at the top of each tower and on the span. The span can be lifted by one electrical drive in each tower. The tops of the lift towers were tapered to be flush with the top of the lift span.

The lower deck contains two roadways and sidewalks, one on each of the west and east sides. The roadways are each 34 feet (10 m) wide, carrying one direction of traffic on Broadway, and the sidewalks are each 8 feet (2.4 m) wide. A median divides the two roadways. In addition, there are 80 short tons (71 long tons; 73 t) of subway and electrical conduits along the bottom of the Harlem Ship Canal. The conduits had to be placed in a trench at the bottom of the canal because it was infeasible to place fixed conduits on the movable span.

=== Previous spans ===
The first span at the site, the Harlem Ship Canal Bridge, was a single-deck swing bridge. It measured 551 feet (168 m) from end to end, or 483 feet (147 m) excluding stone abutments. It was constructed with four sections supported by three masonry piers. The two central sections comprised the swing span, which pivoted around a small masonry island in the middle of the canal. On either side of the masonry island were navigable openings that measured 104 feet 1 inch (31.72 m) wide at mean high water. The swing span was flanked by two 100-foot-long (30 m) approach structures, as well as stone abutments. It was operated by steam engines. The bridge had a total width of 50 feet (15 m), with a roadway of 33.5 feet (10.2 m) and two sidewalks of 8.25 feet (2.51 m). The bridge weighed 1,200 short tons (1,100 long tons; 1,100 t), with the machinery comprising one-sixth of the weight.

The second span, the 225th Street Bridge, was a double-deck swing bridge. The upper deck carried the subway tracks while the lower deck carried a 35-foot-wide (11 m) road, two 7-foot-wide (2.1 m) sidewalks, and the Metropolitan Street Railway's streetcar tracks. There was room for three vehicular lanes. The swing span was 266 feet (81 m) long and, when closed, provided 25 feet (7.6 m) of vertical clearance and 100 feet (30 m) of horizontal clearance. It weighed 1,500 short tons (1,300 long tons; 1,400 t) and was operated by two electric motors, each of 60 horsepower (45 kW). The approach spans had riveted Warren trusses about 20 feet (6.1 m) deep with their centers spaced 39 feet (12 m) apart. The south approach measured 100 feet (30 m) in length and weighed 330 short tons (290 long tons; 300 t), while the north approach measured 112 feet (34 m) in length and weighed 380 short tons (340 long tons; 340 t).

== History ==
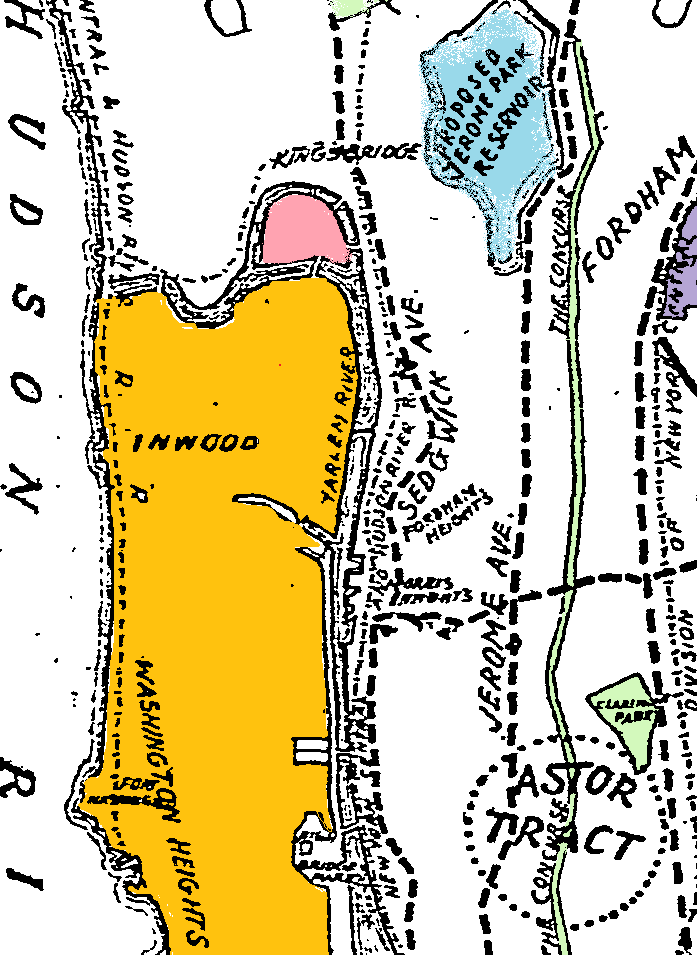
Detail from an 1896 map, showing Marble Hill (pink) as an island. The bridge originally connected Marble Hill with Inwood (orange). In 1908 the bridge was moved south, connecting Inwood with the Bronx (white) to the east.

Prior to the construction of the Harlem River Ship Canal, Marble Hill was part of Manhattan Island, and the Spuyten Duyvil Creek made a tight curve around the northern shore of Marble Hill, connecting the Hudson River on the west shore of Manhattan Island with Harlem River on the east shore. Early crossings of the creek included the King's Bridge, opened in 1693, and the Free (or Farmers) Bridge, opened in 1759. Both bridges were relatively narrow; the King's Bridge was 24 feet (7.3 m) wide and the Farmers Bridge was 18 feet (5.5 m) wide.

Though plans to connect the Harlem and Hudson rivers with a more straightforward path were proposed in the early 19th century, construction of the Harlem River Ship Channel did not start until January 1888. Furthermore, as a result of the River and Harbor Act, passed by the United States Congress in 1890, bridges on the Harlem River with low vertical clearance were to be replaced with those with at least 24 feet (7.3 m) of clearance during mean high water springs. Drawbridges and swing spans were determined to be most suitable for this purpose.

=== First span ===
In accordance with the canal project and the congressional legislation, in 1892, the New York City Department of Public Works was commissioned to build a bridge connecting Inwood and Marble Hill, which would carry Broadway. A corresponding state law, passed that April, allocated $400,000 (equivalent to $12,802,000 in 2025) to the project. The canal was to be opened only after the bridge's abutments were constructed, thus saving the bridge's builders $50,000 (equivalent to $1,600,000 in 2025) by allowing them to construct the abutments in the dry canal bed. The New York City Board of Estimate approved the Harlem Ship Canal Bridge in February 1893. William Hubert Burr, Alfred P. Boller, and George W. Birdsall were named as the bridge's architects, while A. McMullen & Co. was named as contractor.

When the bridge and canal were being constructed, one 4-foot-high (1.2 m) dam was placed at each end of the canal; any leaks were pumped away by steam engines. The bridge's piers were then installed in the path of the canal. During construction, in April 1893, the dams were destroyed in a heavy storm, causing the canal bed to be flooded before the canal was completed. The foundations for the bridge's abutments were sunk into the bed of the canal using caissons. The bridge opened on January 1, 1895. At the time, it was one of several swing bridges that had been built on the Harlem River, and it was the second-oldest major bridge in New York City behind the Brooklyn Bridge. After the Marble Hill section of the canal opened on June 17, 1895, the Harlem Ship Canal Bridge was able to swing open for boat traffic.

The Harlem Ship Canal Bridge connected the islands of Manhattan and Marble Hill, as the Spuyten Duyvil Creek continued to flow around the northern side of Marble Hill until 1914. Another bridge on the northern side of Marble Hill opened in 1900; it carried Broadway over the old creek bed and, along with the King's and Farmers' Bridges, provided direct connections to the Bronx. That span, which had also been called the Broadway Bridge, was demolished by the late 1920s.

=== Second span ===
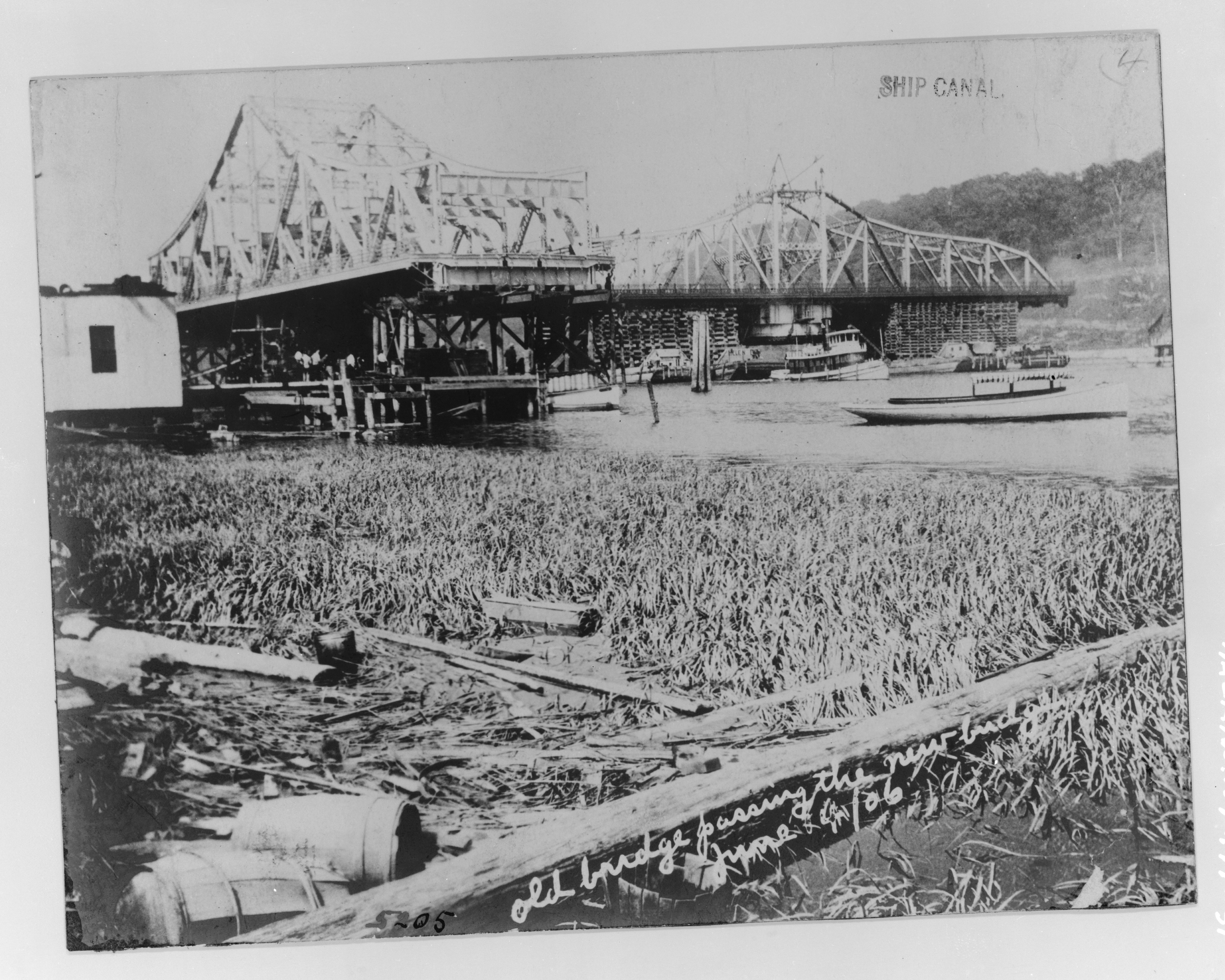
Replacement of the first swing span with the second span in June 1906

Around 1900, the city sold the Harlem Ship Canal Bridge to the Rapid Transit Construction Company, which was building the first city subway line. The subway's West Side Branch was to cross the Harlem River Ship Canal above Broadway, which necessitated modifying or replacing the existing bridge. The Interborough Rapid Transit Company (IRT), which had been formed to operate the subway, determined the existing structure could not support the elevated subway line, choosing instead to build a second, double-decker swing bridge. The old substructure was deemed to be sufficiently strong to support the weight of a new span. The need to replace the Harlem Ship Canal Bridge was further emphasized in 1903, when the New York State Legislature passed legislation allowing the realignment of the New York Central Railroad's Spuyten Duyvil Line (now the Metro-North Railroad's Hudson Line) along the Harlem River's eastern bank. The railroad wished to avoid a grade crossing with the Metropolitan Street Railway's streetcar tracks, to be built on the lower deck. Ultimately, the city made an agreement with the three railroads to relocate the first span down the Harlem River, only ten years after it had been constructed. The old Harlem Ship Canal Bridge became the University Heights Bridge, which opened in 1908.

The American Bridge Company was contracted to construct the new bridge. The temporary framework for the second bridge's swing span was constructed at 216th Street in Manhattan, slightly south of the bridge site. The approach spans were constructed next to Broadway, along the shore where they were to be installed. Pile-driving for the new swing span began at 216th Street in May 1905 and was finished that September. The approach spans were built on crib piers that rested along flatcars, with each span slightly overhanging the shore on either end. After the approach spans were completed, the approach spans were pushed off the flatcars and floated onto scows. The spans of the old Harlem Ship Canal Bridge were replaced with the new double-decker spans in three phases. Traffic on Broadway was not to be interrupted for more than five days total. After the old spans were disconnected from their old location and moved aside, the corresponding sections of the second bridge were floated into place. The southern approach at Broadway was replaced in October 1905, followed by the northern approach in November. The old swing span was replaced with the new swing span in June 1906. The second span ultimately cost $1,182,782 to install. When the IRT's West Side Branch was extended in March 1906, it had a temporary terminal at 221st Street, just south of the bridge's Manhattan end. Subway service was extended over the Broadway Bridge to Marble Hill–225th Street in January 1907 and the 221st Street station was closed.

By the early 1930s, there were proposals to build the long-delayed Henry Hudson Bridge to the west, carrying traffic on the Henry Hudson Parkway (New York State Route 9A). The project was being upheld as a way to alleviate traffic on the Broadway Bridge, which in 1933 accommodated 28,000 vehicles a day, almost as much as the Holland Tunnel between New Jersey and New York. While the Henry Hudson Bridge was to be a toll bridge, the Broadway Bridge charged no toll for the eleven million vehicles that, at the time, crossed it every year. In mid-December 1934, the section of Broadway across the bridge was signed as US 9 within New York City for the first time, as were several other U.S. Highways and state routes. The section of US 9 south of the bridge ran to 179th Street, turning west to the George Washington Bridge to New Jersey, while the section north of the bridge ran to the Bronx and Westchester County. The Henry Hudson Bridge opened in 1936.

In 1949, the city's commissioner of public works proposed that a lift bridge be built for $7.64 million (equivalent to $82 million in 2025) to replace the second Broadway Bridge. The swing span's three vehicular lanes could no longer accommodate modern traffic loads, and a lift span would provide more horizontal clearance for marine traffic. As part of this proposal, the lift bridge would carry six lanes, and the sections of Broadway on either side of the bridge would be widened to 125 feet (38 m). The Bridge Department again called for the construction of a lift bridge in 1956, this time at a cost of $12.71 million (equivalent to $115 million in 2025), although the city would still not include money for a new bridge in its budget. The 225th Street Bridge was damaged by fire that October, requiring it to be closed for emergency repairs. In January 1957, Public Works Commissioner Frederick H. Zurmuhlen announced that the swing bridge had sustained more severe damage than originally projected, and that it would be difficult to close the swing span due to warping of the steel beams. The swing bridge was closed to tall marine vessels in 1957.

=== Third span ===
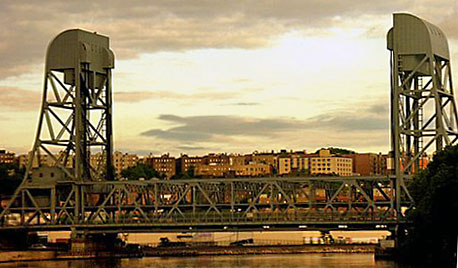
The third and current Broadway Bridge, with a subway train crossing the upper deck

Zurmuhlen announced in February 1958 that work would commence on a new lift span costing $13.4 million (equivalent to $115 million in 2025). The first phase of the work was awarded to the Moore & Lopier Construction Corporation and involved constructing new piers parallel to the second swing span. The American Bridge Company constructed the new lift span on the Bronx side of the bridge. Because the second 225th Street Bridge was so heavily used, with an average of 23,000 vehicles per weekday, the lift span was built before the lift towers, in the opposite sequence from other lift bridges. A construction schedule was planned so that subway traffic would be disrupted as little as possible.

At the end of November 1960, the second bridge was closed to vehicular traffic, but remained open for subway operation. Subway service on the bridge was suspended for three days starting on December 23, 1960, to install the lift span during the Christmas weekend. High winds delayed the installation of the lift span by one day. Subway service and pedestrian crossings resumed on December 26; the iron-grating roadbed had yet to be welded at the time. The second swing span was towed to just north of the University Heights Bridge, where it was cut up into scrap. The new lift bridge opened to vehicles in January 1961, but was closed to vehicles again that July. This closure allowed the lift machinery to be installed and the approach roadways to be rebuilt. The eastern roadway of the new bridge reopened to two-way vehicular traffic on July 1, 1962, while the western roadway opened that November. After further intermittent closures to marine, road, and subway traffic, work was complete by November 1963.

Mayor John Lindsay proposed enacting tolls along the University Heights Bridge, as well as all other free bridges across the East and Harlem rivers, in 1971. The proposal failed in 1977 after the United States Congress moved to ban tolls on these bridges.

The NYCDOT made some minor renovations to the Broadway Bridge in 2003. The work, costing $10 million, included repairs to the deck as well as placing a protective coating on the lift span's steel beams. By 2005, the NYCDOT had classified the bridge's condition as fair, with a 3.986 rating out of 7, indicating that some components were in need of repair. At the time, it had never undergone a major rehabilitation. In 2018, the NYCDOT awarded a contract to Tutor Perini to renovate architectural, electrical, mechanical, and structural components of the bridge. The same year, the agency announced a plan to improve pedestrian and cyclist access to several bridges over the Harlem River, including the Broadway Bridge. As part of the plan, bike lanes would be added to the bridge by 2021. By 2024, the Broadway Bridge was undergoing another renovation, which was scheduled to be finished in 2027. At the time, the roadways around the bridge had seen a high rate of crashes and pedestrian collisions.
