= William Hubert Burr =

American engineer (1851–1934)

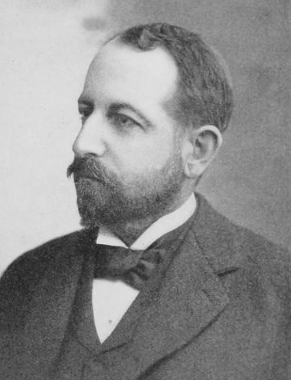
- Born: July 14, 1851; Watertown, Connecticut, US
- Died: December 13, 1934 (aged 83); New York, New York, US
- Education: Rensselaer Polytechnic Institute
- Occupation: Civil engineer
- Spouses: Caroline Kent Sellye (m. 1876; died 1894) Gertrude Ship Goldman (m. 1900)
- Children: 3

William Hubert Burr C.E. (July 14, 1851 – December 13, 1934) was an American civil engineer

== Biography ==
William Hubert Burr was born at Watertown, Connecticut on July 14, 1851. He received his education at the Rensselaer Polytechnic Institute. Over several decades, he worked at various places. In 1884 he became assistant engineer to the Phoenix Bridge Company. After 1893 he was consulting engineer to New York departments, especially in connection with the Catskill Aqueduct work. In 1892–1893 he had been Professor at Harvard University and 1893–1916 Professor for Civil Engineering at Columbia University. In 1904 he was appointed a member of the Isthmian Canal Commission.

As a consulting engineer, Burr was also involved with the design of several bridges, tunnels, and infrastructure projects. In the New York metropolitan area, these included the University Heights (former Harlem Ship Canal) Bridge, Harlem River Speedway, the original City Island Bridge, the original 145th Street Bridge, the Holland Tunnel, the Lincoln Tunnel, and the George Washington Bridge. Burr was also involved with projects such as the Panama Canal; a design for the Arlington Memorial Bridge; and the New York State Barge Canal.

He married Caroline Kent Sellye in 1876, and they had three children. She died in 1894, and he remarried to Gertrude Ship Goldman in 1900.

Burr died at Doctors Hospital in Manhattan on December 13, 1934.

== Works ==
- Stresses in Bridge and Roof Trusses (1879)
- The Elasticity and Resistance of the Materials of Engineering (1883, third edition, 1912)
- Ancient and Modern Engineering and the Isthmian Canal (1902)
- The Graphic Method in Influence Lines for Bridge and Roof Computation (1905, with M. S. Falk)
- Highway Bridges and Culverts (1912, with Charles H. Hoyt)
