= Marble Hill, Manhattan =

Neighborhood in New York City

Marble Hill
- Neighborhood
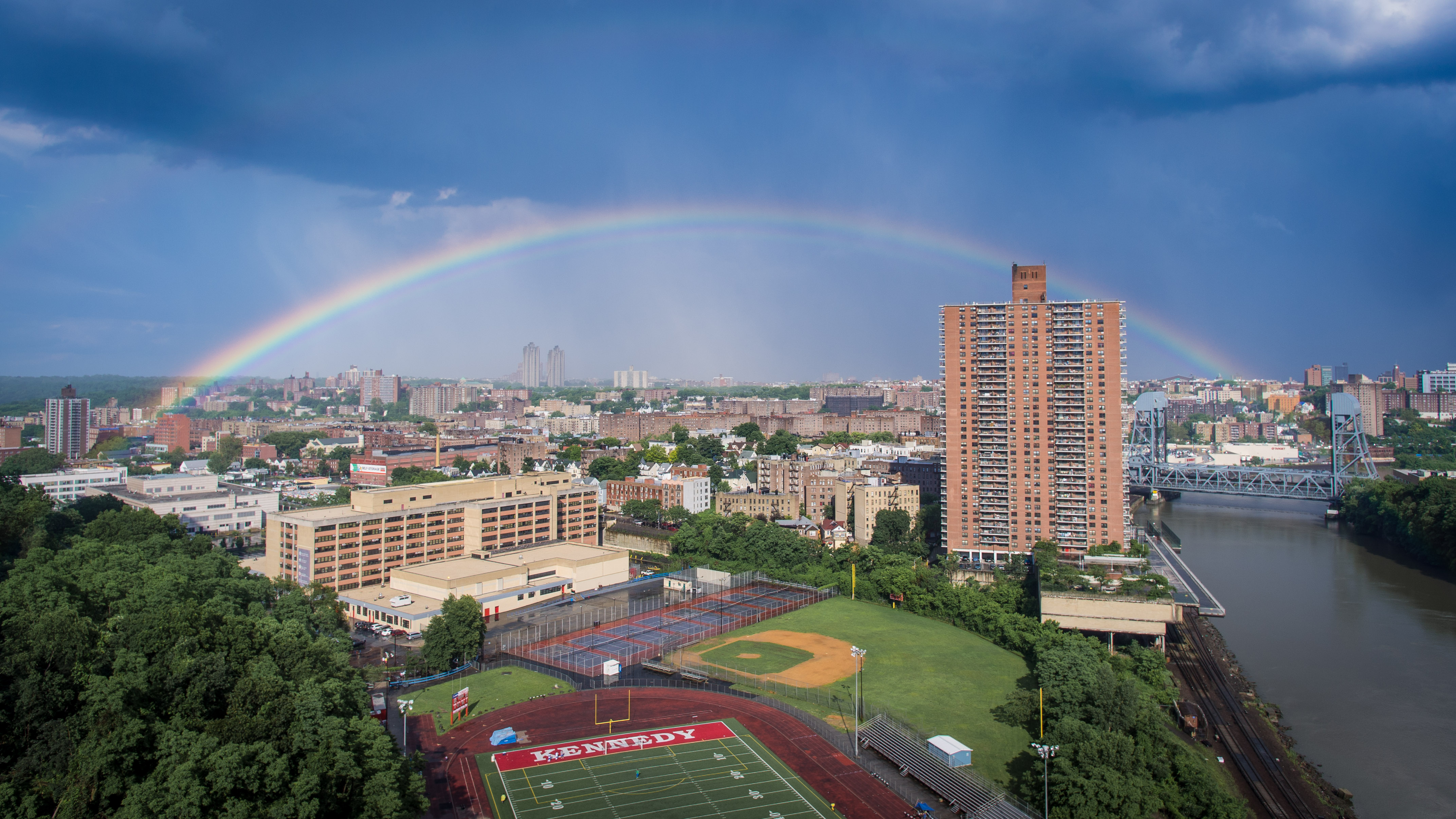
- An overview of Marble Hill seen from the west with John F. Kennedy High School (foreground) and the rest of Marble Hill (center) bound by the Harlem River (on right, the site of the Harlem Ship Canal), and the Bronx (background)
- Interactive map of Marble Hill
- Coordinates: 40.876°N 73.91°W
- Country: United States
- State: New York
- City: New York City
- Borough: Manhattan
- Community District: Bronx 8
- Founded: 1891
- Named for: Local deposits of dolomitic marble quarried for federal buildings in lower Manhattan when New York was the capital of the United States in the 1780s.

Area
  - Total: 0.145 sq mi (0.38 km^{2})

Population (2010)
  - Total: 9,481
  - Density: 65,400/sq mi (25,200/km^{2})

Economics
  - Median income: $44,096
- ZIP Code: 10463
- Area code: 718/347/929/465, 917
- Website: www.marblehillalliance.com

Marble Hill is the northernmost neighborhood in the New York City borough of Manhattan. The neighborhood is bordered by Johnson Avenue on the west, 230th Street on the north, Broadway on the east, and Spuyten Duyvil Creek to the south. Although Marble Hill is legally considered part of Manhattan, it is physically connected to the borough of the Bronx and is not part of the island of Manhattan.

The area later known as Marble Hill became a Dutch colonial settlement in 1646. It served as a crossing point to the mainland when the colonial British had the King's Bridge constructed in 1693 to span the Spuyten Duyvil Creek. It gained its name in 1891 from the Inwood marble deposits discovered underneath the neighborhood. At one time, Marble Hill was part of the island of Manhattan. The neighborhood became a separate island in 1817 when two small streams were dug up to form a narrow canal that separated Marble Hill from the rest of Manhattan. In 1895, the canal was expanded and became the Harlem River Ship Canal. Marble Hill remained an island until it was physically connected to the Bronx by land reclamation in 1913.

Marble Hill is accessible from the rest of Manhattan by the Broadway Bridge. The neighborhood has Bronx area codes and a Bronx ZIP code; furthermore, it is part of Bronx Community District 8 and is served by the New York City Police Department's 50th Precinct, headquartered in the Bronx.

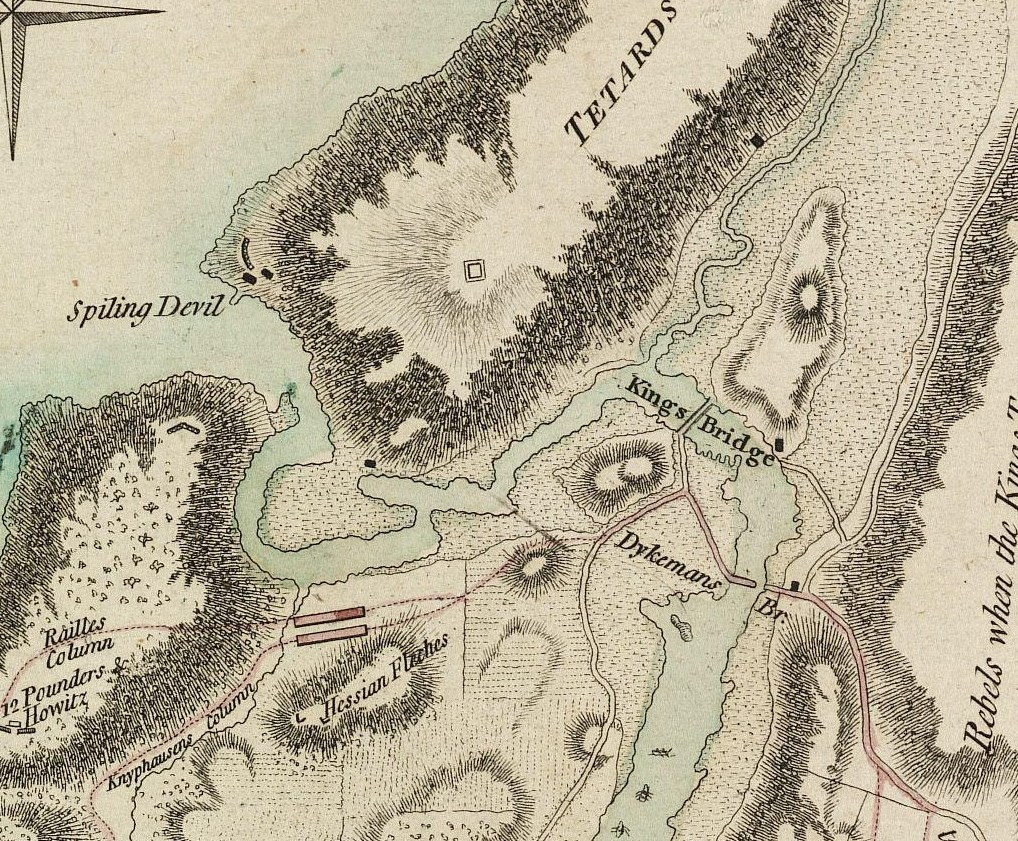
Original course of Spuyten Duyvil Creek and location of King's Bridge and Marble Hill area in the late 1700s.

== History ==
=== Colonial era ===
Marble Hill has been occupied since the Dutch colonial period. On August 18, 1646, Governor Willem Kieft, the Dutch Director of New Netherland, signed a land grant to Mattius Jansen van Keulan and Huyck Aertsen which included the area later known as Marble Hill. Johannes Verveelen petitioned the Harlem authorities to move his ferry from what is now the East River and 125th Street to Spuyten Duyvil Creek because the creek was shallow enough to wade across, thus providing a means of evading the toll. The ferry charter was granted in 1667. Many settlers circumvented the toll for the ferry by crossing the creek from northern Marble Hill to modern Kingsbridge, Bronx, a point where it was feasible to wade or swim through the waters. In 1669 Verveelen transplanted his ferry to the northern tip of Marble Hill, which later became the intersection of Broadway and West 231st Street.

Two bridges connected Marble Hill with the mainland: the King's Bridge and the Dyckman Free Bridge. In 1693 Frederick Philipse, a Frisian-born merchant who had sworn allegiance to the Crown upon the British takeover of Dutch New Netherlands in 1664, built the King's Bridge at Marble Hill near what is now West 230th Street in the Bronx. A prominent trader in New Amsterdam, Philipse had purchased vast landholdings in what was then Westchester County during the 1670s and 1680s. Granted the title Lord of Philipse Manor, he established a plantation and provisioning depot for his shipping business upriver on the Hudson River in present-day Sleepy Hollow. His toll bridge provided access and opened his land to settlement. Later, it carried the Boston Post Road. In 1758, the Free Bridge was erected by Jacob Dyckman and Benjamin Palmer. It opened on January 1, 1759. Its purpose was to serve the farmers who refused to pay the toll. Stagecoach service was later established across the span. The new bridge proceeded to take much of the traffic away from the King's Bridge.

One of the local visiting spots during this period was a tavern operated by the Dyckman family, which also owned the Dyckman House. The tavern was situated to cater to the traffic from both bridges. In 1772 the Dyckmans sold the tavern to Caleb Hyatt, known afterwards as Hyatt's Tavern at the Free Bridge. The Dyckmans used the proceeds to finance a new operation on the west side of Broadway and 226th Street that was to be managed by Benjamin Palmer, who owned property on City Island.

=== American Revolution ===
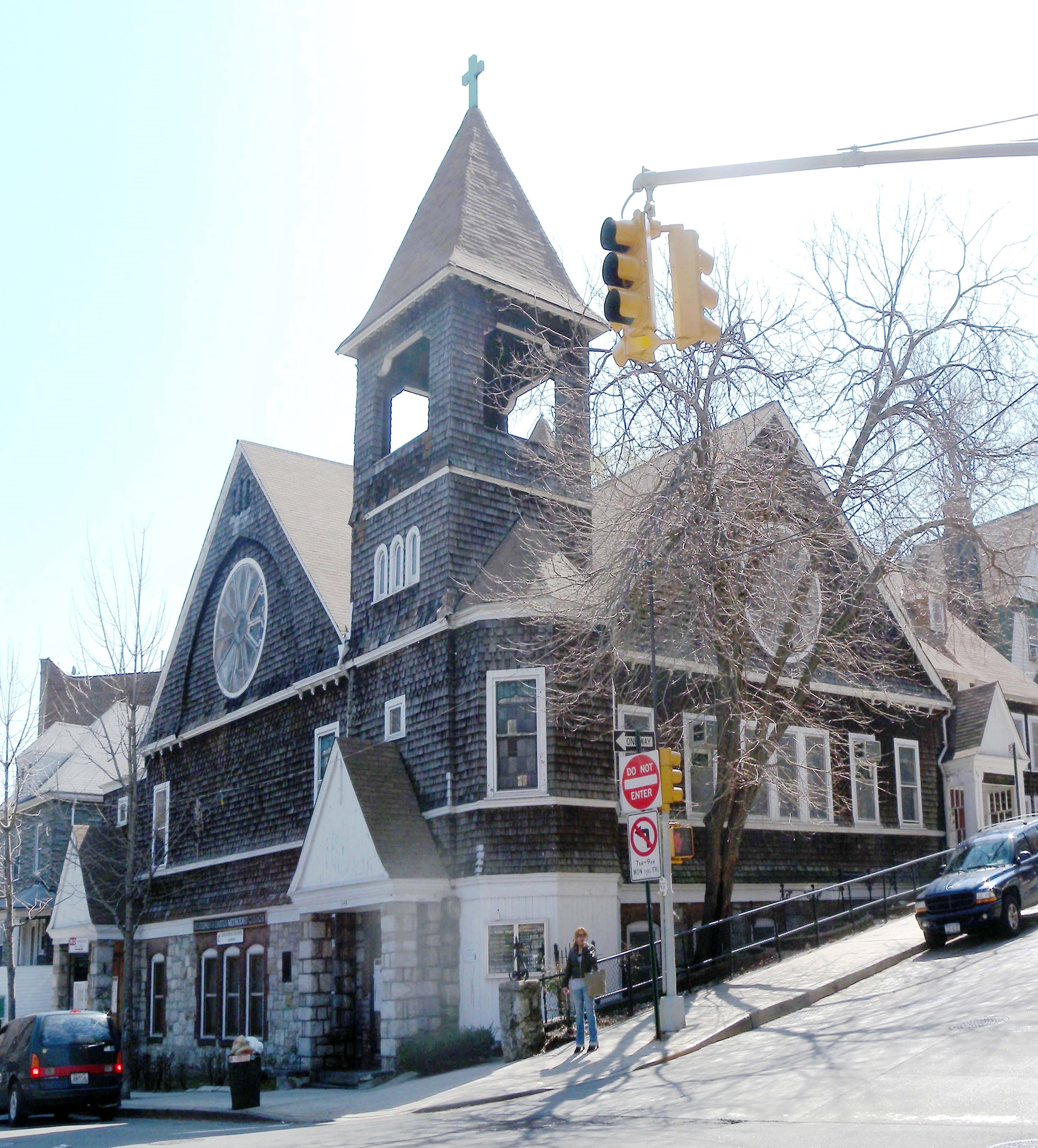
St Stephen's United Methodist Church

When hostilities broke out at the start of the American Revolution, the Continental Army constructed a fort on Marble Hill as part of a series of forts to defend the area. By November 1776, the fort had been taken over by Hessian forces and renamed Fort Prince Charles in honor of Charles, Duke of Brunswick, brother-in-law to George III. Despite contrary beliefs, the King's Bridge and the Dyckman Free Bridge served as escape routes for the retreating American forces after the Battle of Fort Washington on November 16, 1776. The latter of these bridges was destroyed during the war. In January 1777, an American attack was made in the Marble Hill area against the Hessian occupiers. This particular raid was under the command of General William Heath, which, when the cannons opened up, forced the Hessians to retreat from the tavern to the fort to return fire.

=== 19th century ===
Hyatt's Tavern remained in the Hyatt family until 1807, when it was leased to James Devoe. The building was eventually razed, succeeded by the Kingsbridge Hotel on the east side of Broadway at 226th Street. The hotel had a mansard roof and a central turret. It catered to the anglers and sportsman who came to the area either by the Hudson River Railroad Company or boat service up the Harlem River. One of the meals served at the hotel was turtle dinner, which became a favorite of the guests. The hotel's business declined when Broadway was widened and interest was lost in the community. The hotel eventually fell into disrepair and was torn down in 1917.

Philipse Manor was forfeited to the state legislature after the war. Afterward, the King's Bridge was free. In 1817, Curtis and John Bolton purchased land in the area, laying a road called Bolton Road. Their home was on the south side of the community and included a marble mill.

The name of Marble Hill was conceived by Darius C. Crosby in 1891 from the 100-to-500-foot-deep (30 to 152 m) deposits of marble underlying it. Dolomite marble is a relatively soft rock that crops out in Inwood and Marble Hill, known as Inwood marble. The marble was quarried for the federal buildings in lower Manhattan when New York was the capital of the United States in the 1780s.

==== Separation from Manhattan Island ====
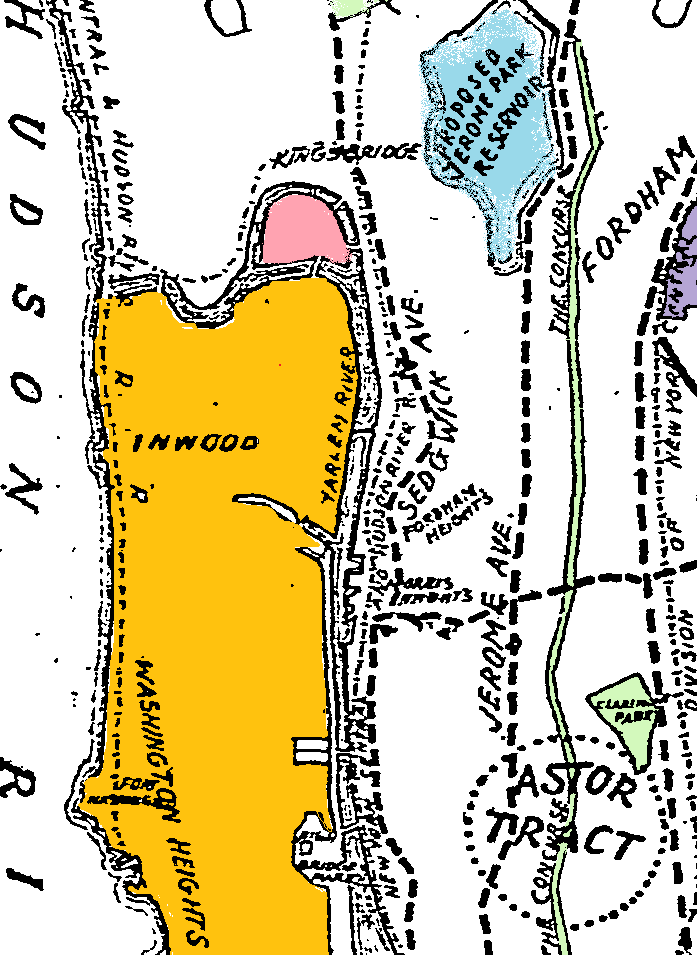
Marble Hill (highlighted in pink) in an 1896 map

Marble Hill formed Manhattan island's northernmost tip. The Spuyten Duyvil Creek flowed to the neighborhood's north, connecting the Hudson and Harlem Rivers. The creek separated Marble Hill from the Bronx, and by extension, the North American mainland. Marble Hill became an island in its own right in 1817, when two small streams were dug up to form a 30-foot-wide canal. This waterway ran 1500 feet east–west from the Spuyten Duyvil Creek to the Harlem River at approximately 222nd Street, cutting off Marble Hill from Manhattan Island. Known at different times as Dyckman's Canal, Boltons’ Canal, or Nichols’ Canal, the waterway once powered Curtis and John Bolton's marble mill, which sat alongside it.

After an increase in ship traffic in the 1890s, the United States Army Corps of Engineers determined that a wide canal was needed for a shipping route between the Hudson and Harlem rivers. Such a canal had been proposed since the early 19th century. Construction of such a waterway, the Harlem River Ship Channel, finally started in January 1888. The canal was to be 400 feet (120 m) in width and had a depth of 15 feet (4.6 m) to 18 feet (5.5 m). It would be cut directly through the rock of Dyckman's Meadow, making a straight course to the Hudson River.

The first section of the canal, the cut at Marble Hill, was completed in 1895 and opened on June 17 of that year. Several festivities including parades were held to commemorate the occasion. This rendered Marble Hill an island bounded by the canal to the south and the original course of the Harlem River to the north. The Greater New York Charter of 1897 designated Marble Hill as part of the Borough of Manhattan.

=== 20th century ===
A bridge opened over the former Marble Hill alignment of the creek in 1900, carrying Broadway. The bridge's superstructure was moved to be used on the 207th Street bridge about a mile south on the Harlem River, with the construction of the IRT subway above Broadway in 1904.

==== Connection to the Bronx ====
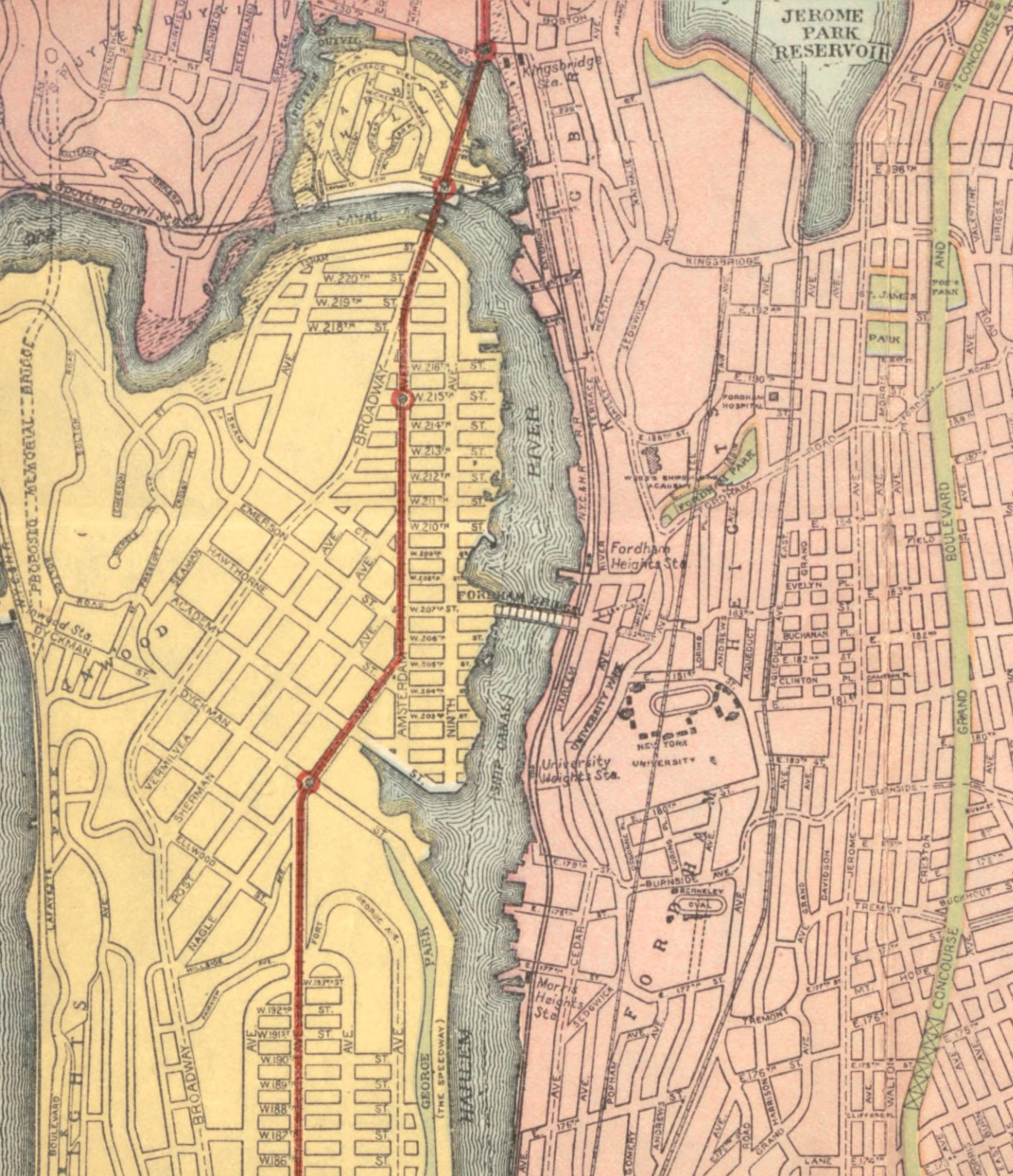
1908 map of the Spuyten Duyvil Creek separating Marble Hill from the Bronx mainland

Marble Hill remained an island until 1913, when it was physically connected to the Bronx. At that time, the old Spuyten Duyvil Creek was filled in with rocks that were removed to build Grand Central Terminal in central Manhattan. Both the King's and Dyckman Free Bridges were covered over with landfill. The bridge carrying Broadway over the former alignment of the creek at 230th Street was destroyed in the late 1920s. At 210 West 230th Street (at the southwest corner with Broadway) is a plaque designating the area as the site of the King's Bridge. The site of the Dyckman Free Bridge is located on the grounds of the Marble Hill Houses.

On January 1, 1914, following passage of an act of the New York State Legislature, Bronx County was created, but Marble Hill remained part of New York County.

== Geography ==
Marble Hill is the northernmost neighborhood in the borough of Manhattan. The neighborhood is part of the borough of Manhattan and was once the northernmost tip of the island of Manhattan. Because of the rerouting of the Spuyten Duyvil Creek from the northern to the southern boundary of Marble Hill in the 19th and early 20th centuries, it is no longer part of the island of Manhattan. Rather, it is physically connected to the borough of the Bronx. The neighborhood is bordered by Johnson Avenue on the west, by 230th Street on the north, by Broadway on the east, and by Spuyten Duyvil Creek to the south.

Marble Hill gained its name from the Inwood marble deposits discovered underneath the neighborhood.

== Character ==
=== Architecture ===
Saint Stephen's United Methodist Church, built in 1898, is located at 228th Street and Marble Hill Avenue. It is the third structure of the same name, as well as one of the oldest remaining buildings in Marble Hill. The congregation was founded on Mosholu Parkway in 1826 and was incorporated a decade later, making it one of the earliest religious institutions in the area. It moved to another structure in Riverdale in 1876. The church building was restored in the 1950s, and again in 2010. One of its corners, the one closest to the intersection, has a tall bell tower. There are circular stained glass windows facing both streets. Inside is an Akron Plan-inspired setup with balconies and an auditorium that is laid out like an amphitheater. One of the pastors of St. Stephen's was Reverend William Tieck, who served the church from 1946 to 1977. Tieck was the official Bronx County historian from 1989 to 1996, authoring several books about the Bronx.

Six-story apartment houses were constructed in the 20th century, and in the early 1950s urban renewal came to the area. A complex was built bounded by Broadway, Exterior Street and 225th Street and was called the Marble Hill Houses. This property was acquired by New York City on August 26, 1948. The houses were completed in 1952. Part of the acquisition became the Marble Hill Playground, which is located on Marble Hill Avenue between 228th and 230th Streets. Despite the name, only seven of the 11 towers are actually in Marble Hill; the other four are in Kingsbridge.

Private residences in Marble Hill include detached single- and two-story houses. It is not uncommon to see a detached house next to a multilevel apartment building in Marble Hill. The neighborhood is described as cozy, with neighbors watching out for one another, and a sense of "community spirit." The blocks of Marble Hill with these single-story houses were described as a "well-kept secret": relatively cheap, with ample space and a backyard. In 1995 one reporter wrote of these houses, "Where else in Manhattan can you find a six-bedroom, three-story house on a quiet, tree-lined street with an attic, a basement, an enclosed front porch and a pretty facade for sale for $174,000? Or a three-family house with six bedrooms on an architecturally magnificent street with an asking price of $295,000?"

=== Street naming ===
Many of the neighborhood's streets were named for Dutch settlers to Marble Hill. For instance, Teunissen Place, a dead-end alley off Terrace View Avenue to the neighborhood's west, is named after Tobias Teunissen, a wool washer from Leyden, Holland, who came to the area in 1636. He applied for and received a land grant to live in Inwood near 213th Street. Occasionally he had worked on the De La Montagne farm, which was in what is now the Harlem section of Manhattan. Teunissen was killed in an Indian raid in 1655, and his wife and child were held hostage until they were ransomed by the Dutch authorities. The Dyckmans and the Nagles, who owned land in Inwood, purchased the Teunissen property in 1677.

Adrian Avenue is named after Adriaen van der Donck, an early lawyer in New Amsterdam. With permission, he bought a strip of land from local Native American tribes in 1646. This land stretched from Spuyten Duyvil to present-day Yonkers along the Hudson coastline.

Van Corlear Place, which comprises half of a U-shaped street curving around Marble Hill, has detached one- and two-family homes in addition to a few brick townhouses. It was named after Anthony Van Corlaer, a messenger of New Amsterdam Governor-General Peter Stuyvesant who was sent to the mainland Bronx for backup soldiers following reports of attempts by British forces to seize New Amsterdam. In Washington Irving's book A History of New York, van Corlaer is said to have drowned while crossing Spuyten Duyvil Creek. The street's name is misspelled.

Jacobus Place, with four large apartment buildings, is named after Jacob (Jacobus) Dyckman, the owner of the Dyckman Tavern and a sponsor of the Dyckman Free Bridge.

Fort Charles Place, the other half of the U-shape that includes Van Corlear Place, has both a large brick apartment building and freestanding private houses with diverse designs, and remains as a token of the Hessian-named Fort Prince Charles.

=== Shopping mall ===
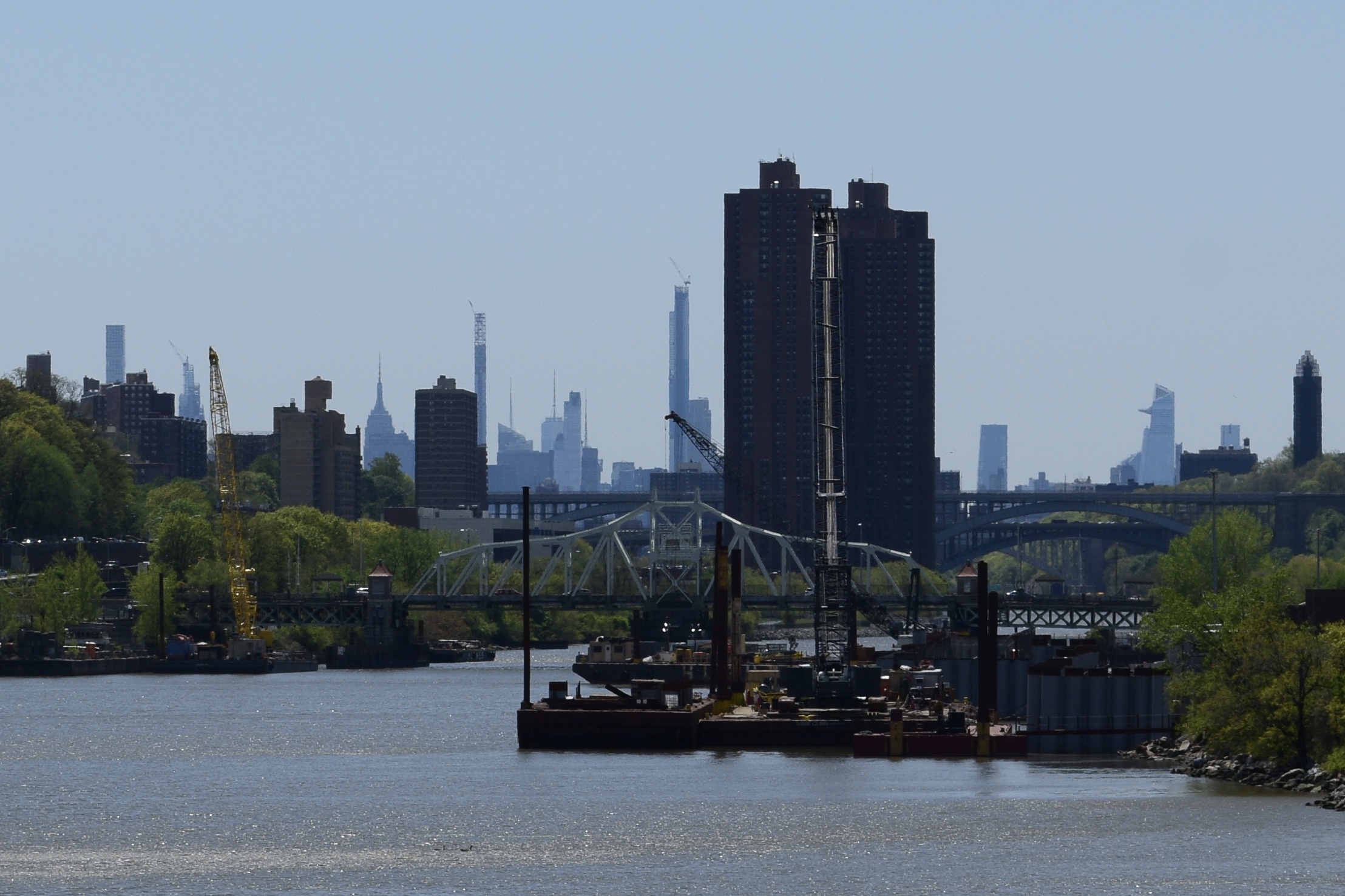
The skyline of Manhattan seen from River Plaza

River Plaza, a shopping mall located on 40 West 225th Street between Broadway and Exterior Street and overlooking the Harlem River, opened in August 2004. It is the commercial center for Marble Hill. It cost $90 million and has a floor area of 235,000 ft^{2} (21,800 m^{2}). The mall, which has an open-air format in which the passageways between stores are outdoors, has a 640-space parking lot on the roof. In 2002, before construction, developers purchased adjacent land from six owners, with the largest building on these lots being a deteriorating, 3 1/2-floor, 326,000 ft^{2} (30,300 m^{2}) warehouse owned by NewYork–Presbyterian Hospital. Since the building could not be renovated cheaply enough, it was demolished. The mall was built on a foundation of soft soil and a shallow water table, so builders had to place 1,500 concrete-capped steel piles into the soil. The finished building was designed to retain views of landmarks like the George Washington Bridge and the Empire State Building.

== Demographics ==
For census purposes, the New York City government classifies Marble Hill as part of a larger neighborhood tabulation area encompassing Inwood and Marble Hill. Based on data from the 2010 United States census, the population of Inwood and Marble Hill was 46,746, a change of -2,341 (-5%) from the 49,087 counted in 2000. Covering an area of 405.79 acres (164.22 ha), the neighborhood had a population density of 115.2 inhabitants per acre (73,700/sq mi; 28,500/km^{2}). The racial makeup of the neighborhood was 15.1% (7,060) White, 9.1% (4,239) African American, 0.1% (64) Native American, 1.9% (884) Asian, 0% (5) Pacific Islander, 0.4% (179) from other races, and 1% (458) from two or more races. Hispanics or Latinos of any race were 72.4% (33,857) of the population.

The racial composition of Marble Hill and Inwood changed moderately from 2000 to 2010, with the most significant changes being the Black population's decrease by 13% (661) and the Hispanic / Latino population's decrease by 5% (1,880). Meanwhile, the White population grew by 5% (335) and remained a minority, as with the Asian population which grew by 11% (86); the small population of all other races decreased by 24% (221).

The entirety of Bronx Community District 8, which comprises Marble Hill as well as Kingsbridge, Riverdale, Spuyten Duyvil, Fieldston, and Van Cortlandt Village, had 102,927 inhabitants as of NYC Health's 2018 Community Health Profile, with an average life expectancy of 80.9 years. This is about the slightly lower than the median life expectancy of 81.2 for all New York City neighborhoods. Most inhabitants are children and middle-aged adults: 28% are between the ages of 25–44, while 25% are between 45 and 64, and 20% are between 0–17. The proportion of college-aged and elderly residents was lower, at 9% and 18% respectively.

Out of Marble Hill's 4,000 households, only 135 lived in private houses as of 1995, down from 138 such households in 1989. The majority of Marble Hill's 9,481 residents (as of the 2010 United States census) live in the Marble Hill Houses. There are also Art Deco apartment buildings lining some streets. These buildings even boast one pedestrian alley, Marble Hill Lane, in a manner similar to in Inwood and surrounding Bronx neighborhoods.

As of 2019, the median household income in Bronx Community District 8 was $47,000 compared to $53,000 in the entire city. In 2019, an estimated 15% of residents lived in poverty, compared to 25% in all of the Bronx and 20% in all of New York City. One in eleven residents (9%) were unemployed, compared to 13% in the Bronx and 9% in New York City. Rent burden, or the percentage of residents who have difficulty paying their rent, is 52% in Community District 8, compared to the boroughwide and citywide rates of 58% and 51% respectively. Based on this calculation, as of 2018, Community District 8 is not considered to be gentrifying: according to the Community Health Profile, the district was not low-income in 1990.

== Police and crime ==
Marble Hill is patrolled by the 50th Precinct of the NYPD in the Bronx, located at 3450 Kingsbridge Avenue. As of 2022, the 50th Precinct had a lower crime rate than it did in the 1990s; crimes across all categories decreased by 69.9% between 1990 and 2022. The precinct reported three murders, 22 rapes, 185 robberies, 213 felony assaults, 126 burglaries, 695 grand larcenies, and 288 grand larcenies auto in 2022.

As of 2018, Bronx Community District 8 has a non-fatal assault hospitalization rate of 40 per 100,000 people, compared to the Bronx's rate of 113 per 100,000 and the citywide rate of 59 per 100,000. Its incarceration rate is 225 per 100,000 people, compared to the Bronx's rate of 670 per 100,000 and the citywide rate of 425 per 100,000.

Of the five major violent felonies (murder, rape, felony assault, robbery, and burglary), the 50th Precinct had a rate of 363 crimes per 100,000 residents in 2019, compared to the Bronx's average of 851 crimes per 100,000 and the citywide average of 572 crimes per 100,000.

In 2019, the highest concentration of felony assaults in Marble Hill was on Broadway between 225th Street and 228th Street, where there were 13 felony assaults. The highest concentration of robberies was nearby, at the intersection of Broadway and 225th Street, where there were 8 robberies.

== Fire safety ==
Engine Co. 81 and Ladder Co. 46 of the New York City Fire Department (FDNY), at 3025 Bailey Avenue, is the primary or "first due" fire station for Marble Hill.

The Marble Hill Hose Company was organized in 1895 because, at the time, there was no fire station in the neighborhood. FDNY horses were unable to climb the neighborhood's steep hills, so the FDNY loaned the company a hose cart; a fire engine was not required because the water pressure in the hydrants were sufficient to propel a stream of water. It was the only independent fire company in Manhattan after the FDNY became a paid fire department in 1865.

== Education ==
=== Schools ===
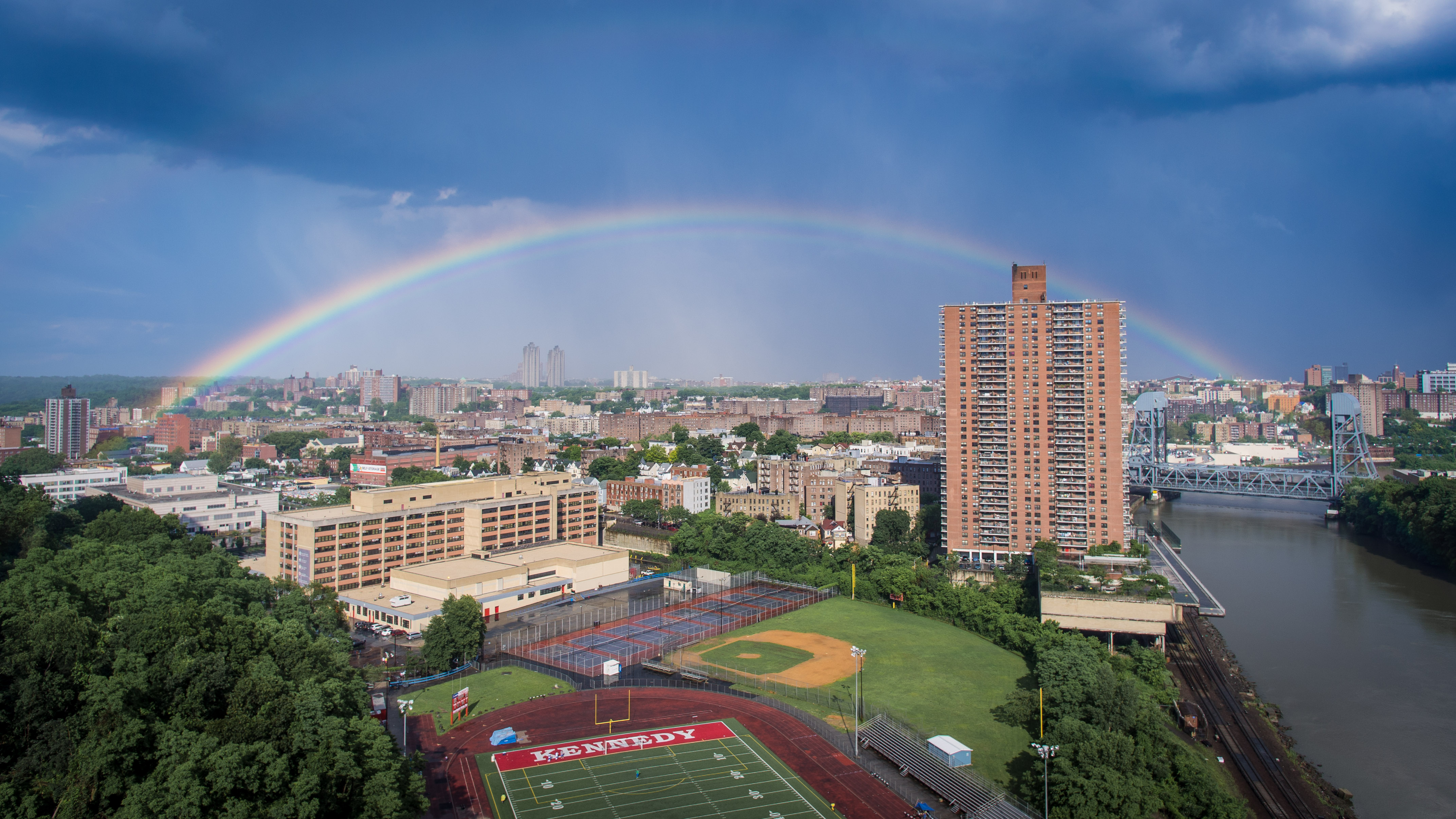
A view of the John F. Kennedy High School campus (bottom left) and athletic fields (bottom center).

John F. Kennedy High School was built in the former riverbed on the western side of Marble Hill, and was opened in September 1972. Beginning in fall 2002, smaller high schools were established within the campus. Due to poor academic performance in the 2000s, as well as a series of violent crimes at the school (including the murder of a student), the New York City Department of Education made a decision in fall 2010 to close the school, phasing out one grade per year until 2014. It closed down in 2014, and six smaller, specialty high schools now occupy its campus: four public, two charter. Four of these schools were founded in 2002, while the other two were established in 2011 after the decision was made to close John F. Kennedy High School. The nearest public elementary school is PS 7 Milton Fein School in Kingsbridge, serving grades K–5.

Nearby private schools include Horace Mann School, Riverdale Country School, and Ethical Culture Fieldston School. The nearest parochial school is now Good Shepherd, in Inwood. The parochial school formerly serving the neighborhood, St. John's, in Kingsbridge was closed in 2020. The Marble Hill Nursery School, in the Marble Hill Houses, is privately operated with some funding with the city.

=== Library ===
The New York Public Library (NYPL) operates the Kingsbridge branch at 291 West 231st Street, which replaced a building from 1959 located across West 231st Street.

== Transportation ==
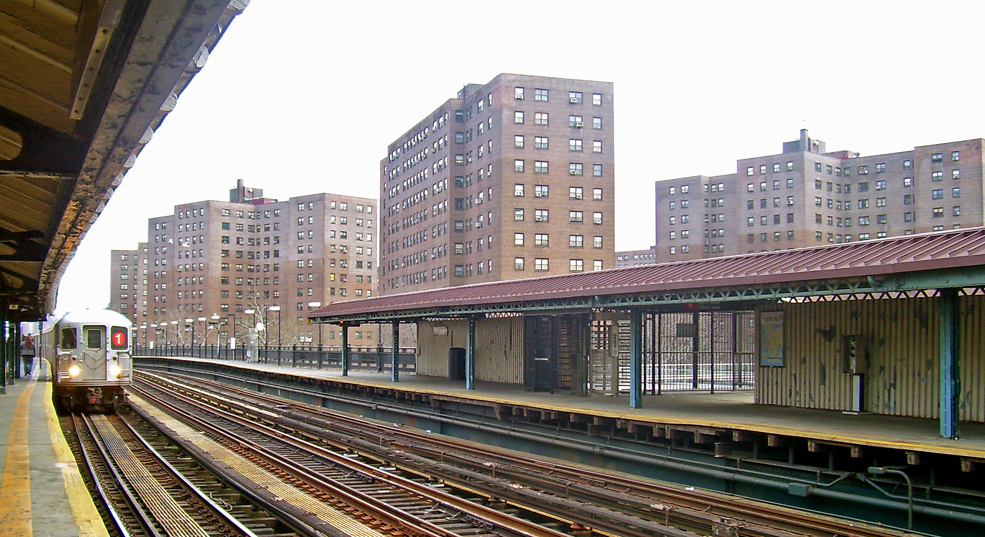
Marble Hill–225th Street subway station

In 1905–1906, the New York Central and Hudson River Railroad built the Marble Hill station as a replacement for the former Kingsbridge Station used by an affiliate known as the Spuyten Duyvil and Port Morris Railroad. The station was relocated from the east side of Broadway to the west side in the late-1970s and is now served by the Metro-North Railroad's Hudson Line, which provides commuter railroad service to Grand Central Terminal in midtown Manhattan, locations in the Bronx, and points north. The station is at the bottom of a substantial cliff. For the purpose of purchasing Combo Tickets, Metro-North considers Marble Hill to be in the Bronx.

The Interborough Rapid Transit Company (IRT) extended their Broadway–Seventh Avenue line, now part of the New York City Subway, from 145th Street to 242nd Street in 1906. As part of the construction, the IRT built a station at 225th Street. That station is served by the 1 train.

The main road through Marble Hill is Broadway, which is part of U.S. Route 9.

== Politics ==
The United States Census Bureau defines Marble Hill as Census Tract 309 of New York County. As of the 2010 census, it had a population of 8,463 on a land area of 0.3065 km^{2} (0.1183 sq mi; 75.7 acres). Because Marble Hill is legally part of Manhattan, residents who serve on jury duty go to the courthouses at Foley Square in lower Manhattan.

=== Political representation ===
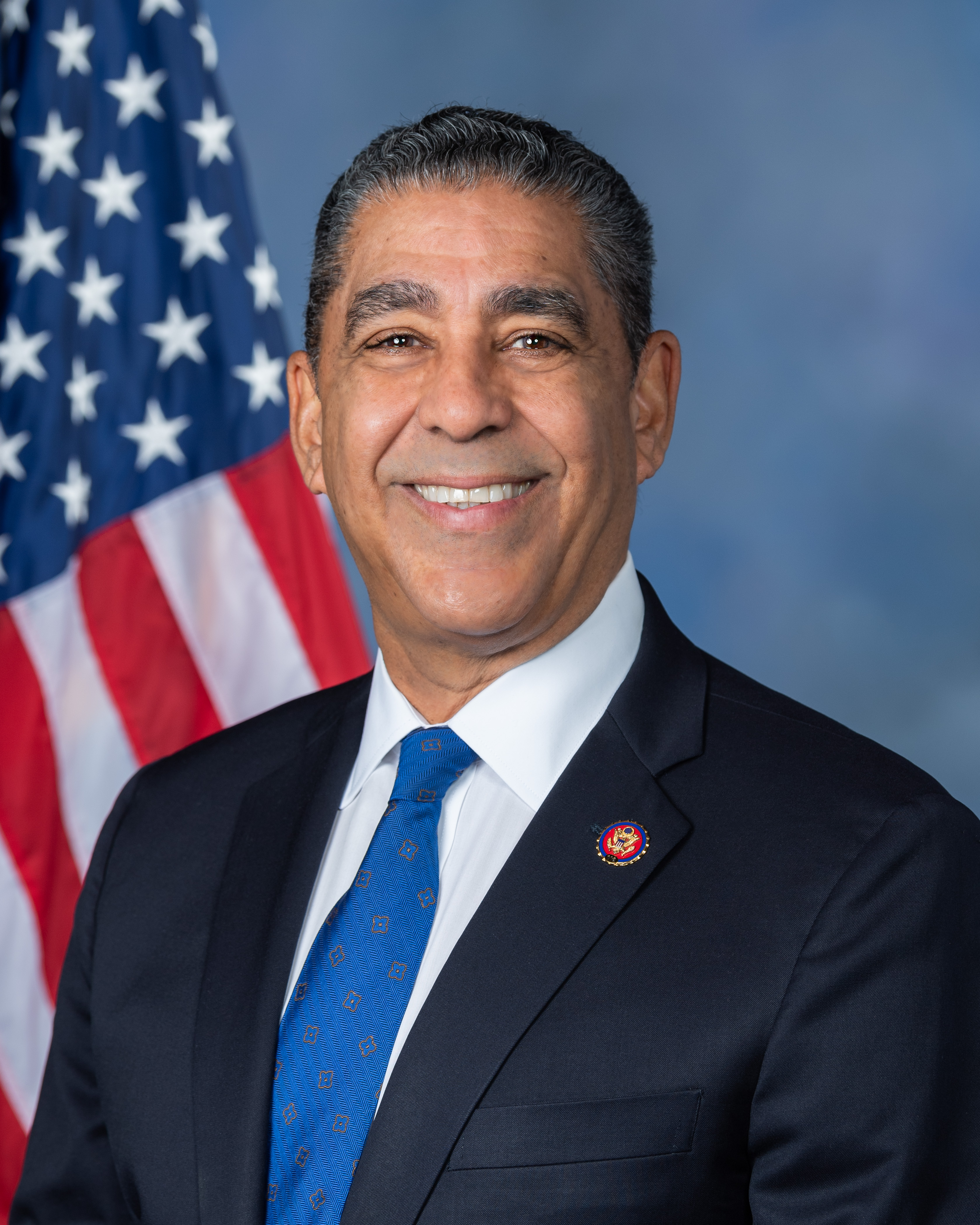
Adriano Espaillat

Politically, Inwood is in New York's 13th congressional district for the U.S. House of Representatives, represented by Democrat Adriano Espaillat since 2017. On the state level, it is in New York State Senate's 31st district, represented by Democrat Robert Jackson, and the New York State Assembly's 72nd district. On the city level, it is in the New York City Council's 10th district. Bronx Community Board 8 is the local community board for Marble Hill.

=== History of political dispute ===
On March 11, 1939, as a publicity stunt, Bronx Borough President James J. Lyons planted the Bronx County flag on the rocky promontory at 225th Street and Jacobus Place. Lyons proclaimed Marble Hill as a part of the Bronx and demanded the subservience of its residents to that borough, saying it was "The Bronx Sudetenland", referring to Hitler's 1938 annexation of the Sudetenland region of Czechoslovakia. The incident was met with boos and nose-thumbing by 50 residents of Marble Hill, who referred to the effort as similar to an "Anschluss". Since then, more lighthearted "annexations" have occurred.

Residents of the neighborhood wished to remain residents of Manhattan, and petitions and signatures were gathered to be sent to Governor Herbert H. Lehman to ensure that Marble Hill remain part of Manhattan. In 1984, in response to one Marble Hill resident's refusal to serve on jury duty for a murder case in Manhattan that year due to the resident claiming that she was not a resident of New York County and Manhattan, New York Supreme Court justice Peter J. McQuillan ruled that Marble Hill was simultaneously part of the Borough of Manhattan (not the Borough of the Bronx) and part of Bronx County (not New York County) and the matter was definitively settled later that year when the New York Legislature overwhelmingly passed legislation declaring the neighborhood part of both New York County and the Borough of Manhattan and made this clarification retroactive to 1938, as reflected on the official maps of the city.

The confusion has been so great that when New York City Councilman Guillermo Linares was elected as Marble Hill's representative in 1991, he originally thought the neighborhood was part of the Bronx.

=== Services ===
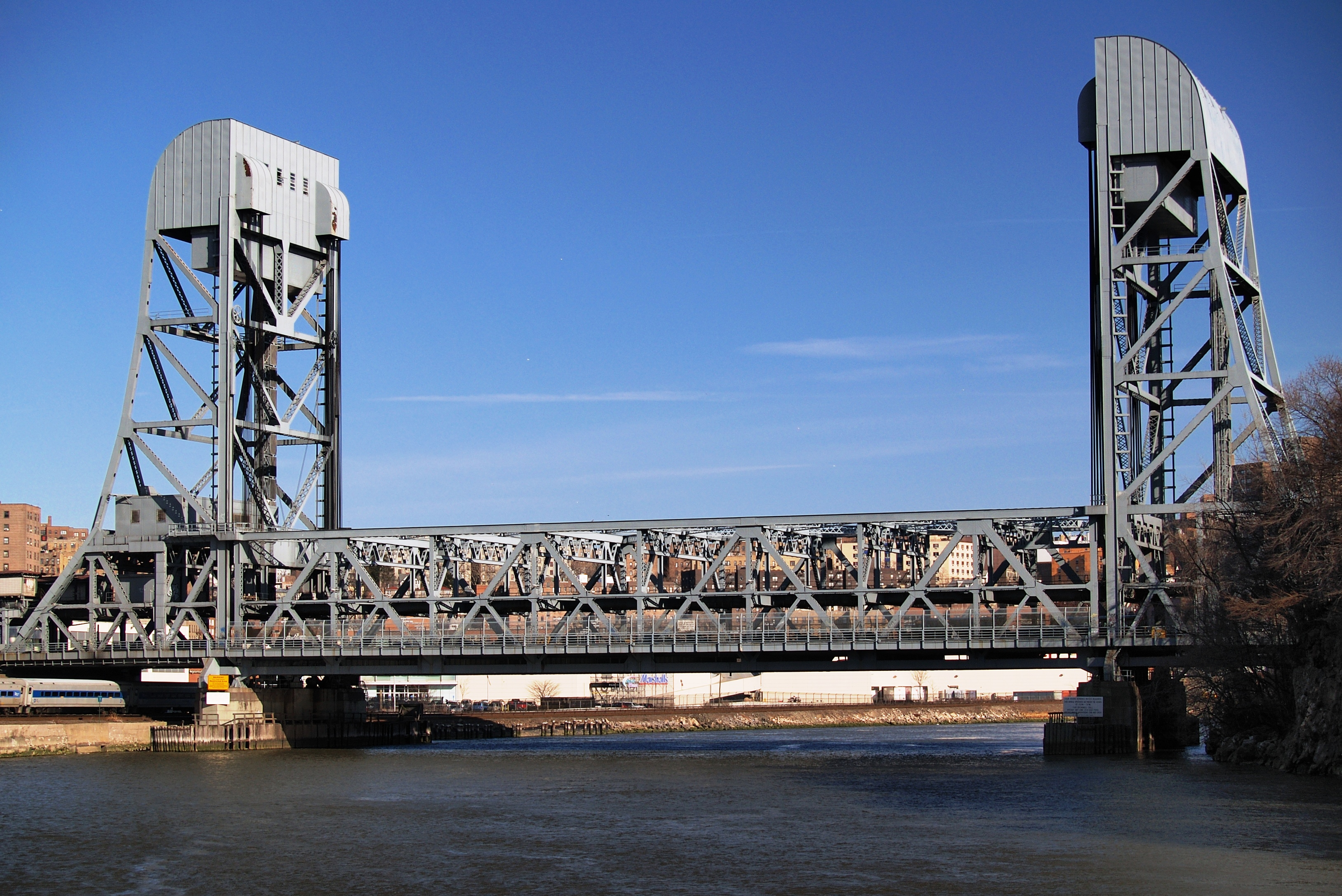
The Broadway Bridge

Marble Hill residents remain part of a political district that includes the northernmost areas of Manhattan (Washington Heights and Inwood), but city services – for example, the fire and police departments – come from and are in the Bronx for reasons of convenience and safety, since the only road connection to the rest of Manhattan is a lift bridge, the Broadway Bridge. However, medical services are provided from Manhattan Island, and medical vehicles come from Columbia University's Allen Pavilion, also known as the Allen Hospital, a satellite facility of NewYork-Presbyterian Hospital.

Marble Hill, along with Spuyten Duyvil and Kingsbridge in the Bronx, is located within ZIP Code 10463. The "104" prefix is used for Bronx localities, while "100" through "102" are reserved for Manhattan addresses – although mail can be addressed to either "New York, New York" using the USPS designator for Manhattan, or to "Bronx, New York" as long as the ZIP Code is accurate. The United States Postal Service operates the Kingsbridge Station post office at 5517 Broadway.

In 1984, area code 718 was created out of area code 212 for the boroughs of Brooklyn, Queens, and Staten Island; the Bronx and Marble Hill were added to the 718 area code in 1992. Marble Hill residents unsuccessfully fought to retain the 212 area code, which was considered more prestigious than the 718 area code. Since then, Marble Hill has been in area code 718 (now also served by four overlay codes: 347, 465, and 929 for the outer boroughs, and 917 for the entire city), but residents are listed in both Bronx and Manhattan telephone books.

== Notable people ==
Notable residents of Marble Hill have included:

- Ted Corbitt (1919–2007), pioneering long-distance runner, the first African-American to run the marathon at the Summer Olympics, and the founding president of New York Road Runners.
- Guillermo Linares (born 1951), politician who represented the 72nd Assembly District in the New York State Assembly
- Justin Pierce (1975–2000), British-American actor and skateboarder
- Charlotte Zaltzberg (1924–1974), writer, nominated for a Tony Award for co-writing the book for the Broadway musical Raisin, which won the Tony Award for Best Musical in 1974.

== Bibliography ==
- Eldredge, Niles and Horenstein, Sidney (2014). Concrete Jungle: New York City and Our Last Best Hope for a Sustainable Future. Berkeley, California: University of California Press. ISBN 978-0-520-27015-2. OCLC 888191476.
- Kadinsky, Sergey (2016). Hidden Waters of New York City: A History and Guide to 101 Forgotten Lakes, Ponds, Creeks, and Streams in the Five Boroughs. New York, NY: Countryman Press. pp. 56–59. ISBN 978-1-58157-566-8.
