= Muscota Marsh =

Public park in Manhattan, New York

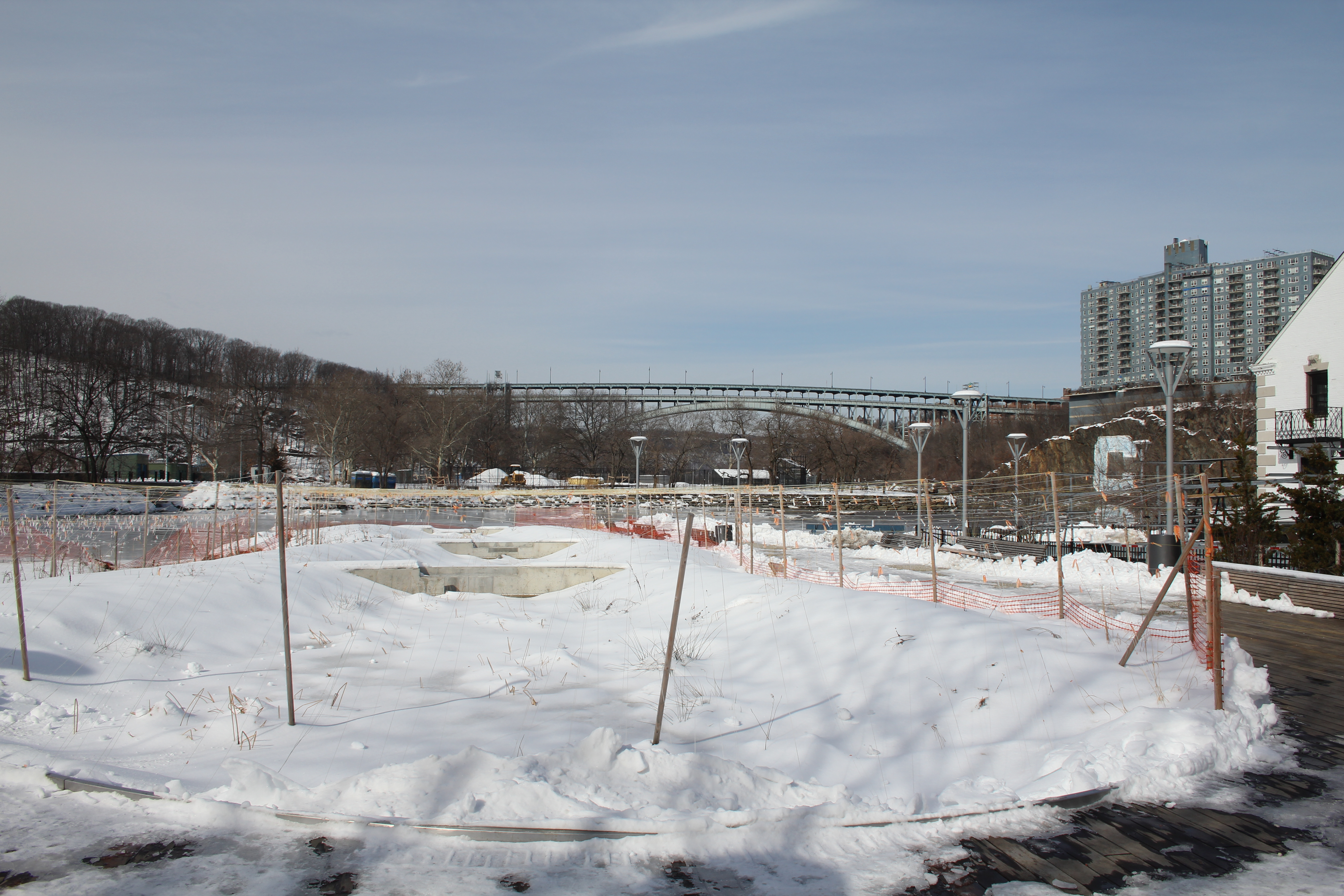
- Muscota Marsh, with freshwater wetland covered by snow in foreground
- Interactive map of Muscota Marsh
- Type: Urban park
- Location: Manhattan, New York City
- Coordinates: 40.873294°N 73.918376°W
- Area: 1 acre (0.40 ha)
- Operator: New York City Department of Parks and Recreation
- Status: Open all year

Muscota Marsh is a one-acre public park in the Inwood section of the borough of Manhattan in New York City, on the shore of Spuyten Duyvil Creek, a section of the Harlem River. It is adjacent to the much larger Inwood Hill Park and Columbia University's Baker Athletics Complex. The park is notable for its views and for its ecological conservation features.

"Muscota" comes from a Lenape word meaning "place of rushes" or "place in the reeds". Before its restoration, the area was known as Boat House Marsh.

Muscota Marsh is unusual for having both a freshwater marsh and a salt marsh in such a tiny area. Besides attracting plant and animal life, these wetlands are intended to help filter rainwater runoff and thereby improve the water quality of the river. Other facilities include a dock for kayaks and canoes, benches, and walking paths. A wooden deck overlooking the river provides views of Inwood Hill Park, the Henry Hudson Bridge, and the New Jersey Palisades.

Opened to the public in January 2014, the park was constructed by Columbia University as part of a deal to construct the new Campbell Sports Center within its adjacent athletics complex. It was designed by James Corner Field Operations, which also worked on Manhattan's High Line. It is cooperatively administered by the New York City Department of Parks and Recreation and Columbia, with the university providing maintenance and security.

== Gallery ==
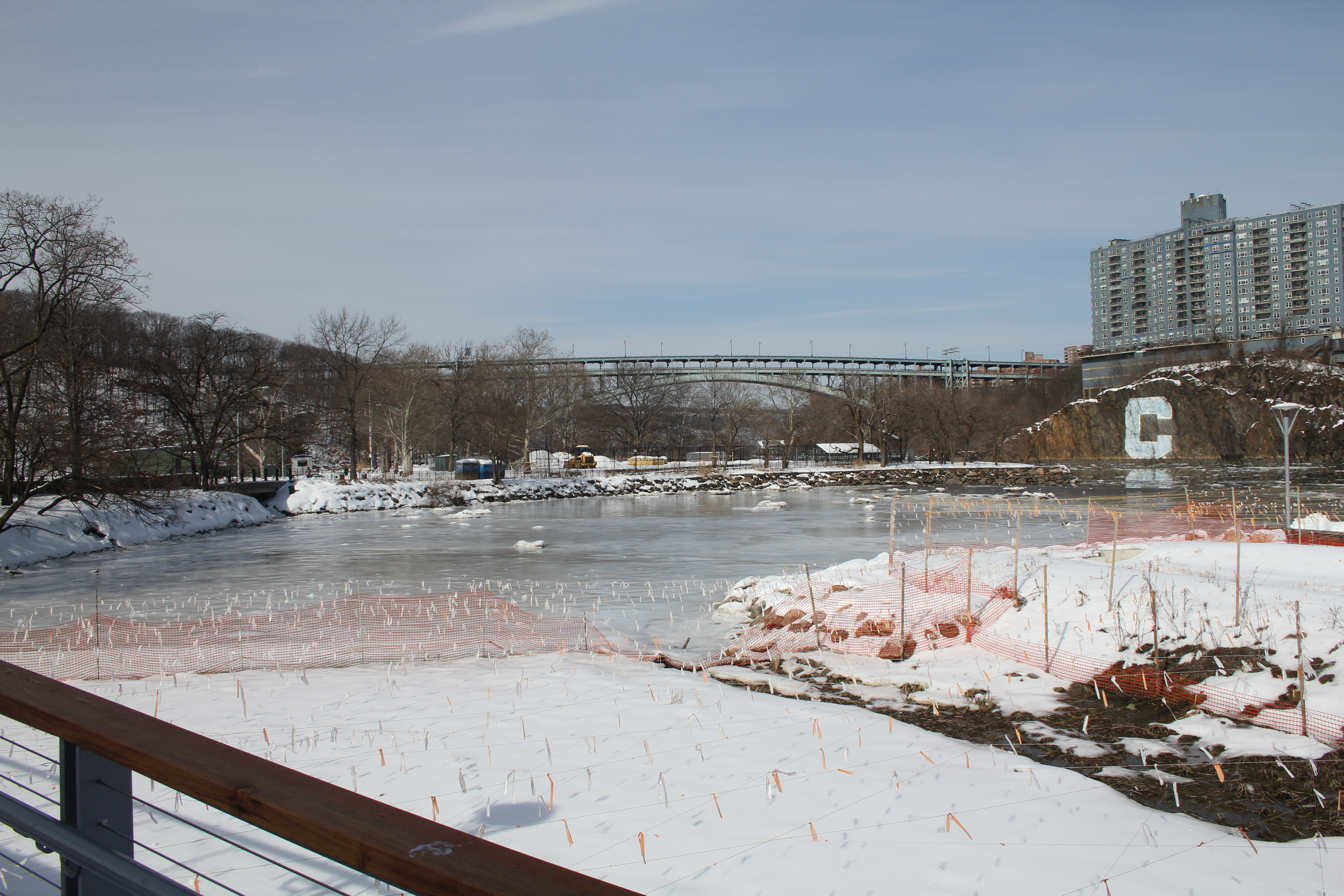
Salt marsh area, with small flags to discourage Canada geese from eating newly planted Spartina grasses.

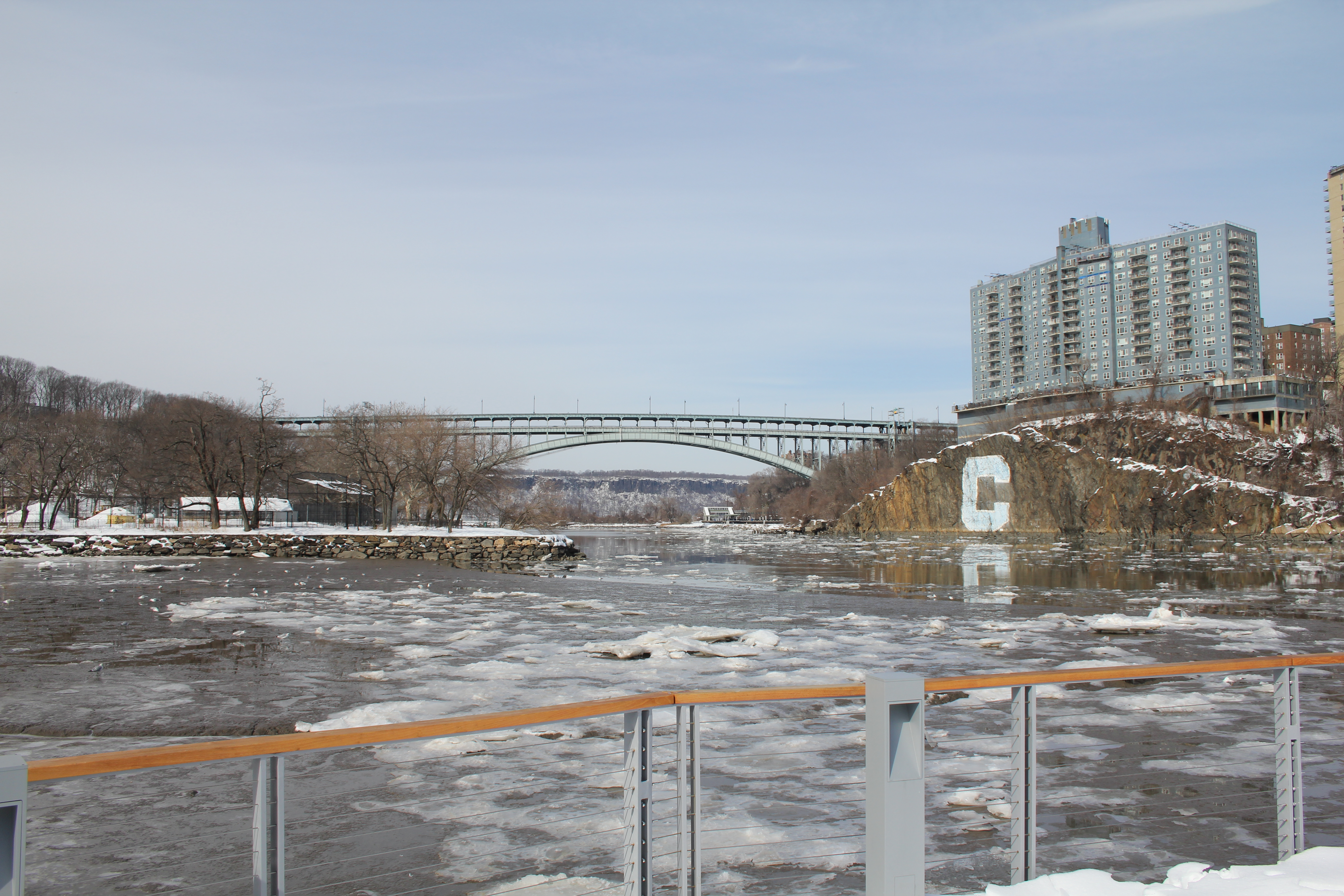
View from park with Inwood Hill Park, Henry Hudson Bridge, N.J. Palisades, and Spuyten Duyvil section of the Bronx.

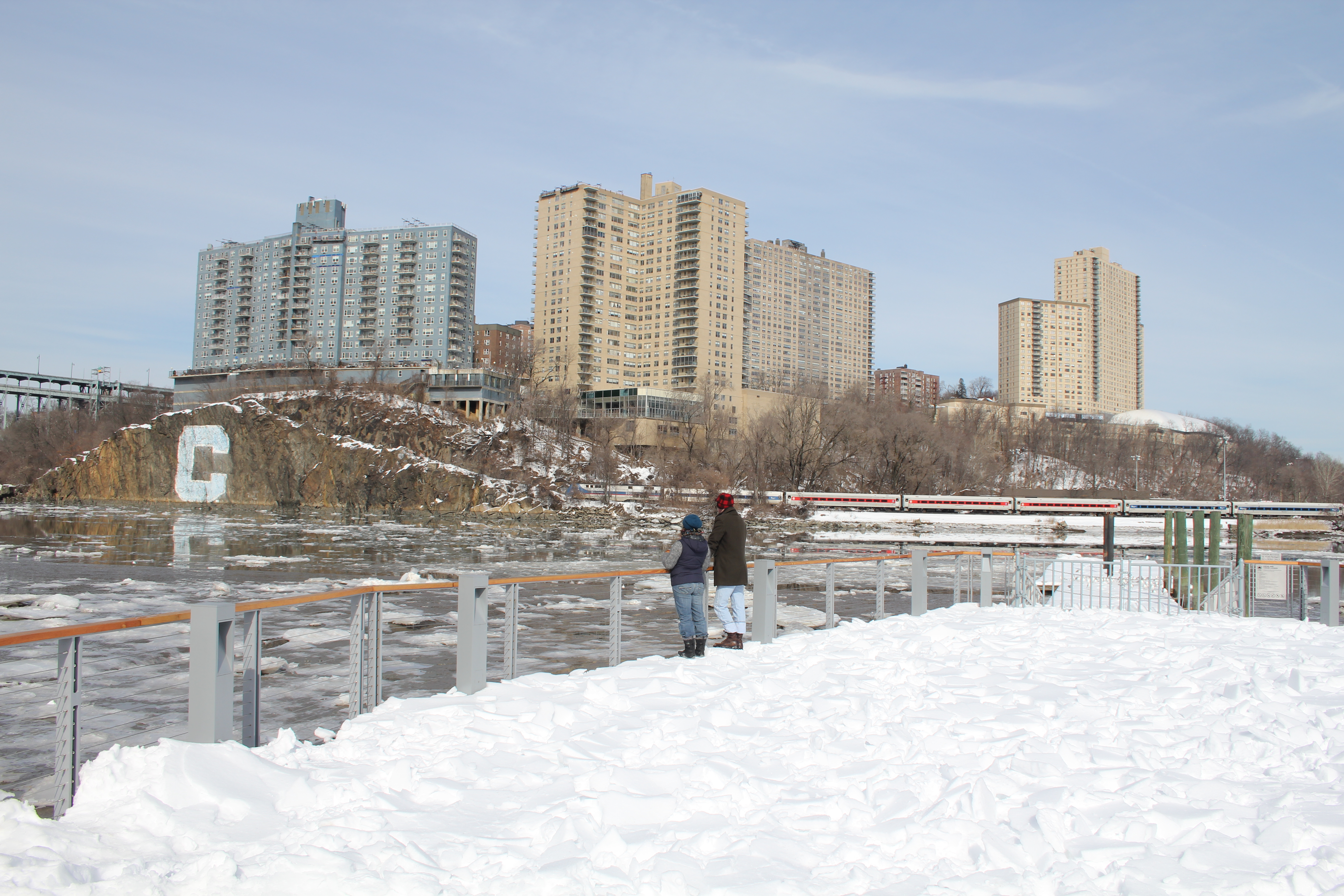
Boat dock and deck covered in snow, with Columbia "C" on opposite bank.
