= Robert K. Kraft Field at Lawrence A. Wien Stadium =

Stadium in New York City

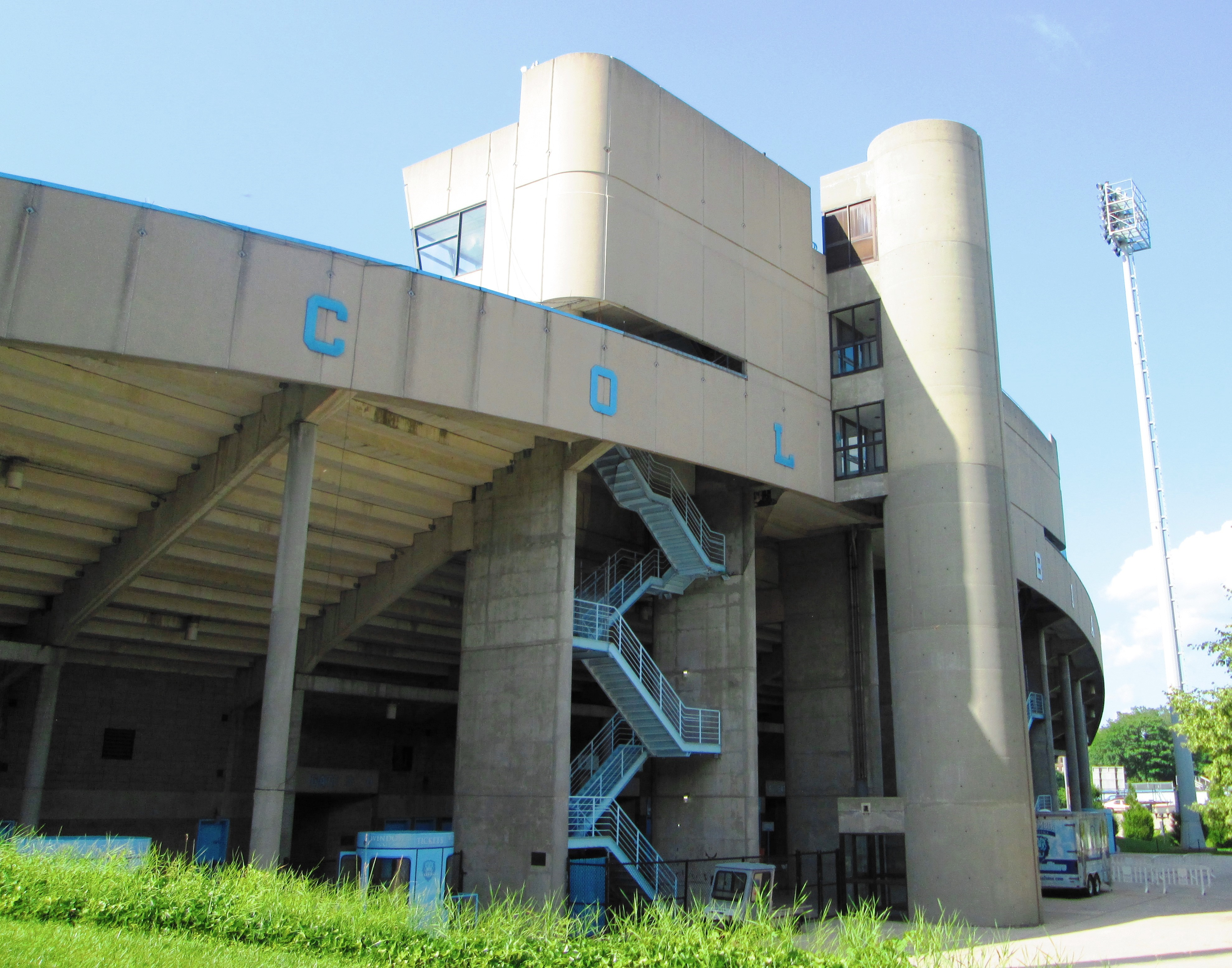
- Interactive map of Robert K. Kraft Field at Lawrence A. Wien Stadium
- Former names: Baker Field (1923–1982)
- Location: West 218th St. at Park Terrace West; Inwood, Manhattan; New York City
- Coordinates: 40°52′24″N 73°54′59″W
- Owner: Columbia University
- Operator: Columbia University
- Capacity: 32,000 (1928–1982); 10,500 (1984–1985); 17,000 (1986–present)
- Surface: Grass (1923–1994); AstroTurf (1995–2004); FieldTurf (2005–present; field); Rekortan (track)
- Public transit: New York City Subway: at 215th Street; at Inwood–207th Street; Columbia Transportation: Bakers Field Shuttle

Construction
- Groundbreaking: 1921
- Opened: 1923
- Cost: $7 million (1984)
- Architect: Dattner Architects

Tenant
- Columbia Lions (NCAA) (1984–present)

Robert K. Kraft Field at Lawrence A. Wien Stadium, officially known as Robert K. Kraft Field at Lawrence A. Wien Stadium at Baker Athletics Complex, is a stadium in the Inwood neighborhood at the northern tip of the island of Manhattan, New York City. Part of Columbia University's Baker Athletics Complex, it is primarily used for American football, lacrosse, and track and field events. The stadium opened in 1984 and holds 17,100 people.

The stadium is about 200 feet from the Spuyten Duyvil Creek banks. Seats have views of the Hudson River, Henry Hudson Bridge, and Broadway Bridge. The location at 218th Street is more than 5 miles (8.0 km) north of Columbia's main campus at 116th Street.

== History ==
Until the 1920s, Columbia's outdoor athletic teams played on South Field, across 116th Street from Low Memorial Library, a site now partially covered by Butler Library.

In December 1921, financier George Fisher Baker purchased a new site for the university's athletics complex for $700,000. The site is at the corner of Broadway, West 218th Street, and Spuyten Duyvil Creek.

Originally named Baker Field, the facility was dedicated the following April, and the football team began playing there in 1923. It was eventually renamed Baker Athletics Complex. A 32,000-seat wooden stadium was built on the site in 1928; it was in use until 1982 when it was demolished to make room for the current Wien Stadium.

=== Wien Stadium ===
The stadium is named after Lawrence Wien, class of 1925, a former trustee, philanthropist, lawyer, and entrepreneur. The 10,500-seat southeast (home side) stands were built first; the 6,500-seat northwest stands opened two years later. For the first 11 seasons, Wien Stadium had grass; it would switch to AstroTurf in 1995 and to FieldTurf in 2005. Wien opened on September 22, 1984, with a game that ended in a loss to Harvard. Columbia did not win a game at home until October 8, 1988, over Princeton. Columbia was amid a 44-game losing streak from 1983 to 1988, the longest in NCAA records at the time. In 1983 while the stadium was being built the Lions played 7 road games and 3 games in the New York City area (2 at Giants Stadium and one at Hofstra Stadium).

The field was named for Robert Kraft, class of 1963, on October 13, 2007, after he gave the school $5 million.

In April 2015, New York City FC of Major League Soccer briefly considered building new stadium at the Baker Athletics Complex. The Stadium was to be demolished and replaced by a 25,000-seat stadium to be used by NYCFC and the Columbia Lions. In 2024 the soccer team began construction of its new $780 million facility at Willets Point, Queens without involving Columbia.

2015 saw the installation of a new turf field, and on November 20, 2015 Columbia played its first-ever Friday night home game under lights.

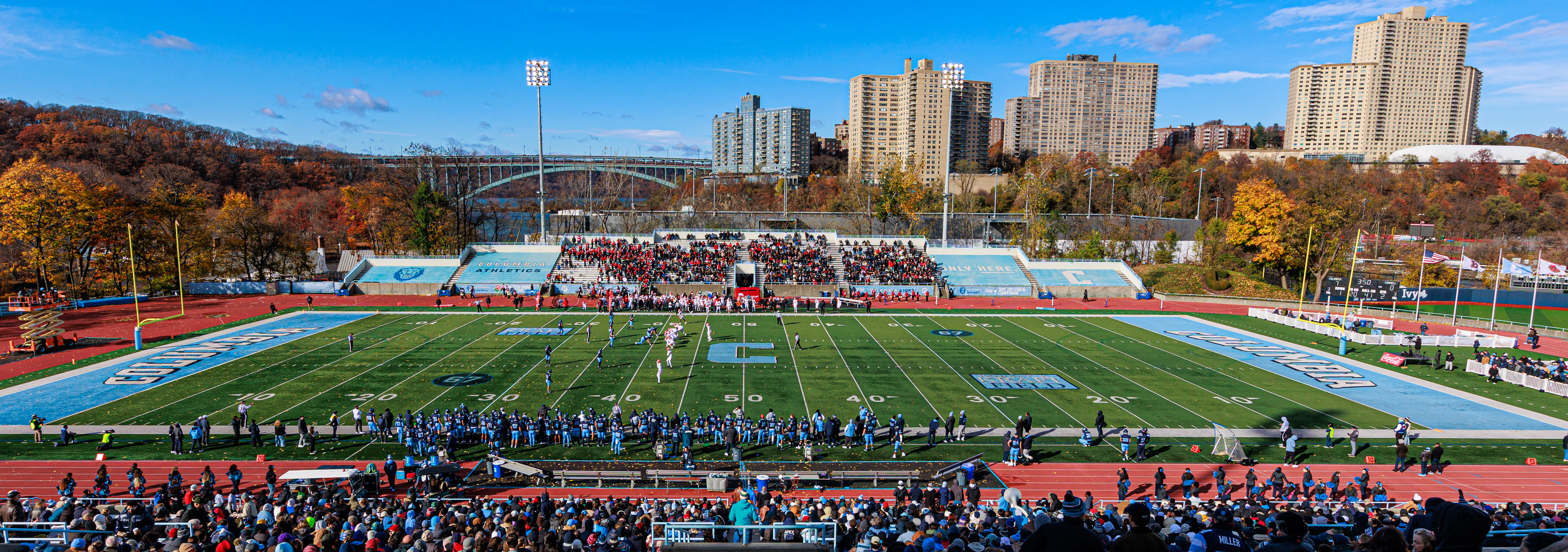
Panoramic view looking north to the visitor grandstand and Henry Hudson Bridge in 2024

=== Use as COVID field hospital ===
In early 2020, during the COVID-19 pandemic, NewYork-Presbyterian / Columbia University Irving Medical Center turned Robert K. Kraft Field and Columbia Soccer Stadium into a 288-bed field hospital. The idea went from proposal to reality in a week. The field hospital was named for Ryan F. Larkin (1987–2017), a decorated U.S. Navy SEAL who served in Iraq and Afghanistan. Kate Kemplin, head nurse of the operation, described Larkin as "exactly the kind of person who would have set up a tent to treat patients if he were alive today." The care center was staffed primarily with former U.S. military personnel and NewYork-Presbyterian's frontline staff.

== See also ==
- List of NCAA Division I FCS football stadiums
