= Dyckman Street =

Street in Manhattan, New York

Coordinates: 40°51′50.42″N 73°55′34.58″W

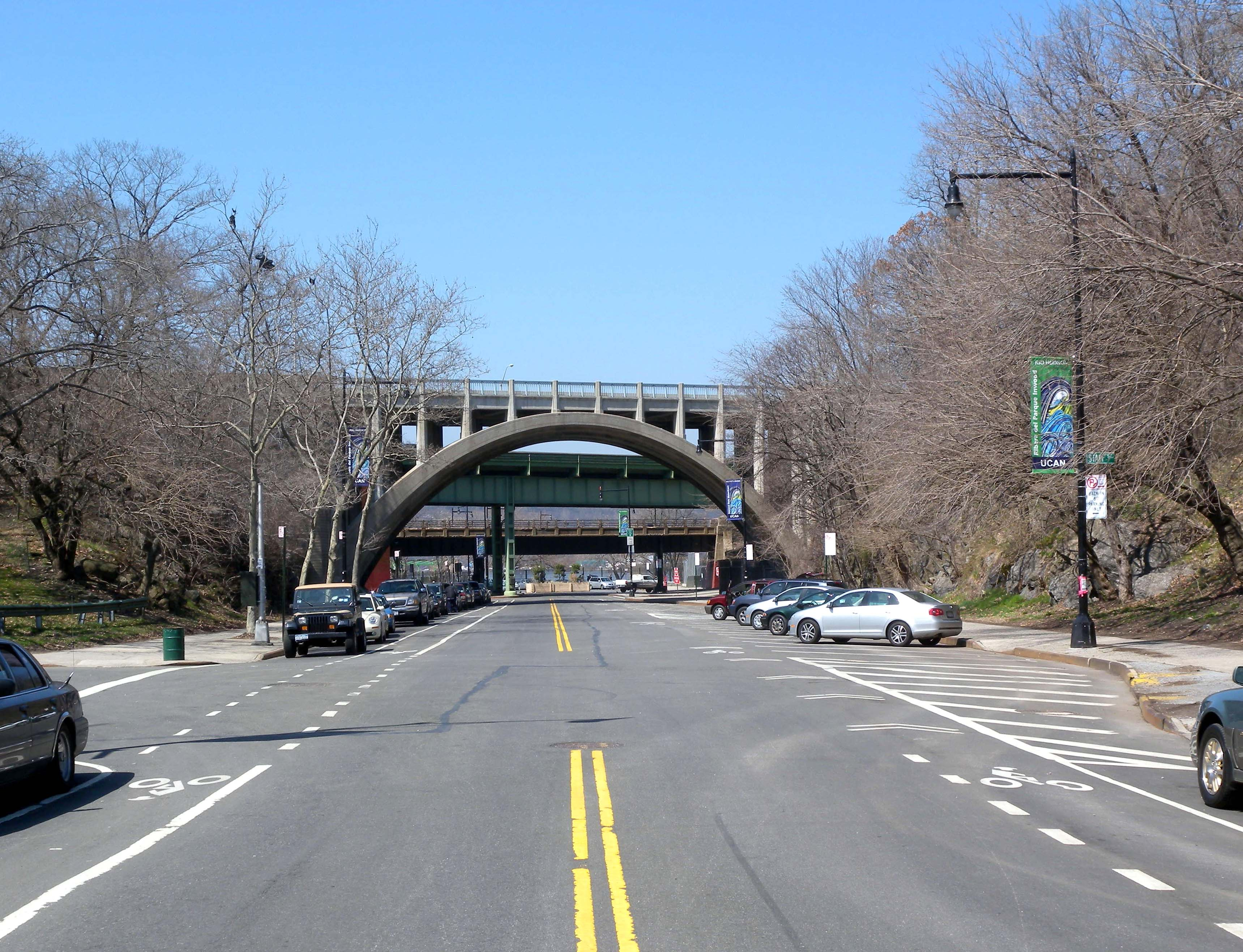
- North end approaching the Henry Hudson Parkway
- Interactive map of Dyckman Street
- Namesake: William Dyckman
- Owner: City of New York
- Maintained by: NYCDOT
- Length: 0.8 mi (1.3 km)
- Location: Manhattan, New York City
- West end: Hudson River in Inwood Hill Park
- Major junctions: US 9 in Inwood
- East end: Harlem River Drive / 10th Avenue in Inwood

Dyckman Street (/daɪkmɪn/ DIKE-man), occasionally called West 200th Street, is a street in the Inwood neighborhood of Manhattan, New York City. It is commonly considered to be a crosstown street because it runs from the Hudson River to the Harlem River and intersects Broadway. However, in its true geographical orientation, Dyckman Street runs roughly from north-northwest to south-southeast, and the majority of the street that lies southeast of Broadway runs closer to a north–south direction than east–west.

It is located where West 200th Street would be: the sequence of numbered Manhattan streets in this neighborhood has a gap between West 193rd Street and West 201st Street (with an exception for a very short West 196th Street). As a rustic 18th century valley road lying between Washington Heights and Inwood Hill, it long preceded the comprehensive Manhattan grid plan, which was not applied in this small part of the island. Dyckman Street has for many years been one of the major shopping streets in the Inwood section, and many consider it the border between Washington Heights and Inwood.

== Name ==
Dyckman Street is named for the Dutch farmer William Dyckman, whose family owned over 250 acres (1,000,000 m^{2}) of farmland in the area; the Dyckman Farmhouse, located nearby at the corner of Broadway and 204th Street, was built by William Dyckman in 1784 and is the oldest remaining farmhouse in Manhattan.

== Route ==
From its northwesternmost point at the Hudson riverbank, Dyckman Street extends southeast past the Henry Hudson Parkway. From there, it continues southeast until it intersects Broadway, where it turns in a more southward direction until it merges with Tenth Avenue to form the northern end of Harlem River Drive. Traffic on Dyckman Street runs in both directions except for a one-block stretch between Broadway and Seaman Avenue, where it runs only northwest (away from Broadway).

The northwestern portion of Dyckman Street separates Inwood Hill Park (to the northeast) from Fort Tryon Park (to the southwest). Additionally, the southeastern portion of Dyckman Street borders the northern tip of Highbridge Park. Bike lanes in Dyckman Street connect the Hudson and Harlem River portions of the Manhattan Waterfront Greenway.

The seismologically active Dyckman Street Fault runs underneath the street.

== Transportation ==
The New York City Subway's Dyckman Street station (A train) on the IND Eighth Avenue Line is located at the intersection of Dyckman Street and Broadway. The Dyckman Street station (1 train) on the IRT Broadway–Seventh Avenue Line is located at the intersection of Dyckman Street and Nagle Avenue.

Bus service is provided by New York City Bus’ M100 south of Broadway.

The Tubby Hook ferry operated from the Hudson River foot of the street to New Jersey at various times from the 18th century until 1942.

In 2018, the city government installed bike lanes along Dyckman Street, connecting the two parts of the Manhattan Waterfront Greenway. The bike lanes were removed after complaints from local business owners; after a spike in cycling deaths, the city announced plans to reinstall the bike lanes.

== In popular culture ==
The character Pete Campbell on the series Mad Men is a descendant of the Dyckman family, and references to the area of Manhattan his family controlled are made in the show's fourth episode. It is mentioned that the Dyckman family owned a large tract of land north of what is now Central Park.

The character Charlotte Mayhew is said to have had a Dyckman Street accent in J. D. Salinger's "Raise High the Roof Beam, Carpenters."

In Migos's hit song "Versace", Drake rhymes, "Word to New York ’cause the Dyckman and Heights girls are callin' me Papi."

In “I Love You Baby” Black Rob raps, “I met her Uptown on Dyckman, aight then Talkin' that, how she only dealt with businessmen.”

In Fabolous' song "I Miss My Love," Fabolous rhymes, "Met her uptown on Dyckman, aight then, light-skinned."

Dyckman Street is known for their diasporic Dominican communities.
