= Henry Hudson Parkway =

Highway in New York

Henry Hudson Parkway
- Henry Hudson Parkway highlighted in red

Route information
- Maintained by NYSDOT, NYCDOT, and NYC Parks
- Length: 10.95 mi (17.62 km)
- Existed: 1937–present
- Component highways: NY 907V (unsigned) entire length NY 9A from Hell's Kitchen to Riverdale
- Restrictions: No commercial vehicles

Major junctions
- South end: NY 9A / West Side Highway in Hell's Kitchen
- I-95 / US 1-9 in Fort Washington Park; US 9 / NY 9A in Riverdale
- North end: Saw Mill River Parkway / Mosholu Parkway at the Van Cortlandt Park–Yonkers line

Location
- Country: United States
- State: New York
- Counties: New York, Bronx

Highway system
- New York Highways; Interstate; US; State; Reference; Parkways

The Henry Hudson Parkway is a 10.95-mile (17.62 km) controlled-access parkway in New York City. The southern terminus is in Manhattan at 72nd Street, where the parkway continues south as the West Side Highway. It is often erroneously referred to as the West Side Highway throughout its entire course in Manhattan. The northern terminus is at the Bronx–Westchester county line, where it continues north as the Saw Mill River Parkway. All but the northernmost mile of the road is co-signed as New York State Route 9A (NY 9A). In addition, the entirety of the parkway is designated New York State Route 907V (NY 907V), an unsigned reference route.

The owners of the parkway are the New York State Department of Transportation, New York City Department of Transportation, New York City Department of Parks and Recreation, Metropolitan Transportation Authority, Amtrak, and Port Authority of New York and New Jersey. The Henry Hudson Parkway was created by the Henry Hudson Parkway Authority, which was run by "master builder" Robert Moses. The highway itself was constructed from 1934 to 1937.

== Route description ==
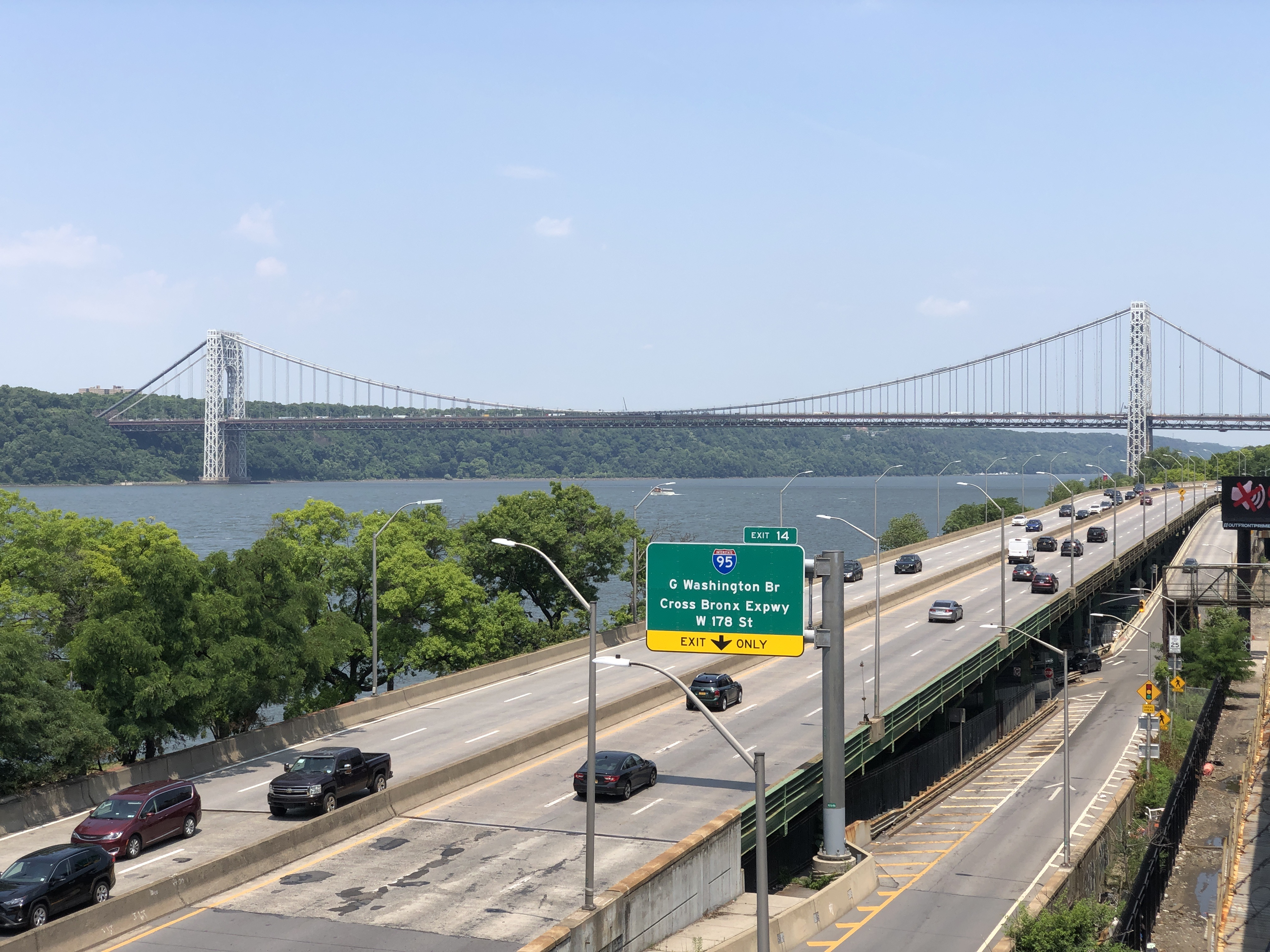
Henry Hudson Parkway near West 153rd Street, with the George Washington Bridge in the background

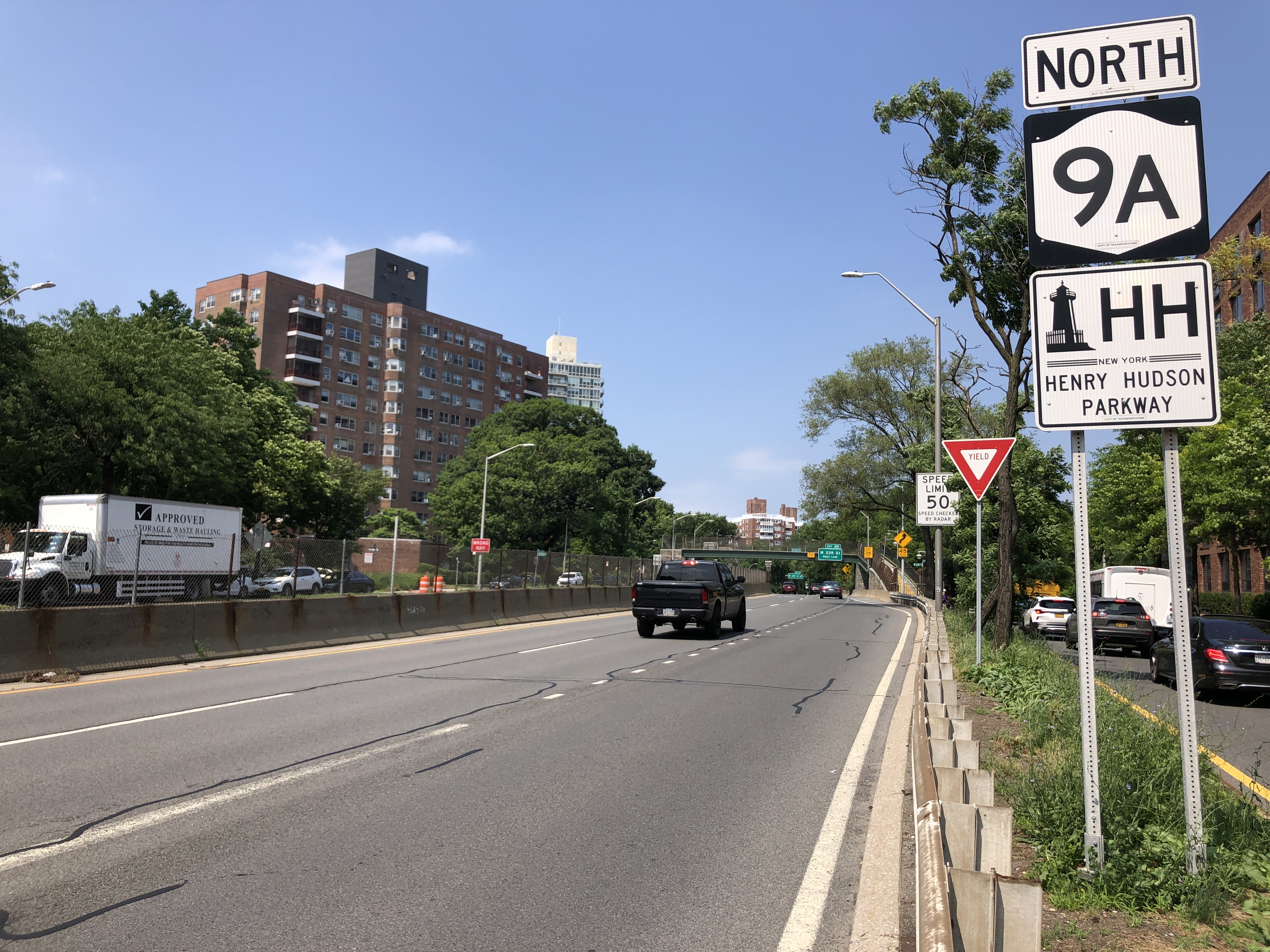
The Henry Hudson Parkway in Riverdale

The Henry Hudson Parkway begins at 72nd Street, which also serves as the north end of the West Side Highway and the last remaining section of the West Side Highway's predecessor, the Miller Highway. The junction is numbered as exit 9, continuing the numbering scheme used on the West Side Highway. It heads northward along the west side of Manhattan, connecting to West 79th Street with a large interchange and to other surface streets with more intermittent exits along the way. The parkway continues in a northerly direction, running almost parallel to Riverside Drive north of West 158th Street. It passes under the Trans-Manhattan Expressway (I-95 and U.S. 1) and the George Washington Bridge as it continues its progression through Fort Washington Park, Fort Tryon Park, and Inwood Hill Park. It then runs northward across the Henry Hudson Bridge into the Bronx.

Upon entering the Bronx, the parkway passes through Spuyten Duyvil and Riverdale as it continues northward, edging slightly to the northeast. Between exits 20 and 22, Riverdale Avenue is split into service roads along the parkway. At exit 23, NY 9A leaves the parkway for U.S. Route 9 (US 9) while the parkway enters Van Cortlandt Park. Soon after it enters the park, the parkway has an interchange with the Mosholu Parkway, which connects it to I-87. Half a mile later, the parkway becomes the Saw Mill River Parkway as it enters Westchester County.

== History ==
=== 20th century ===
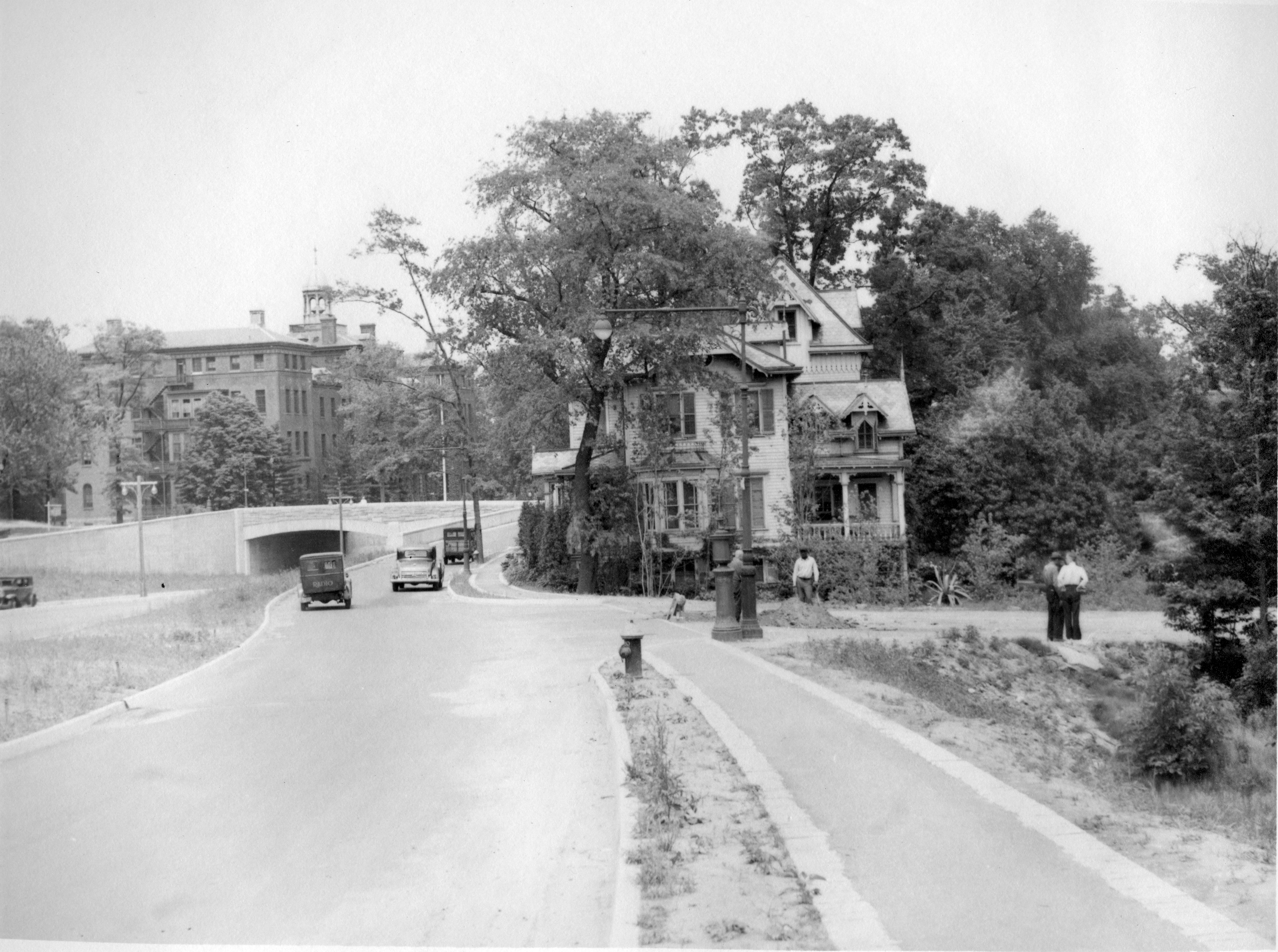
View northward in Riverdale, 1934

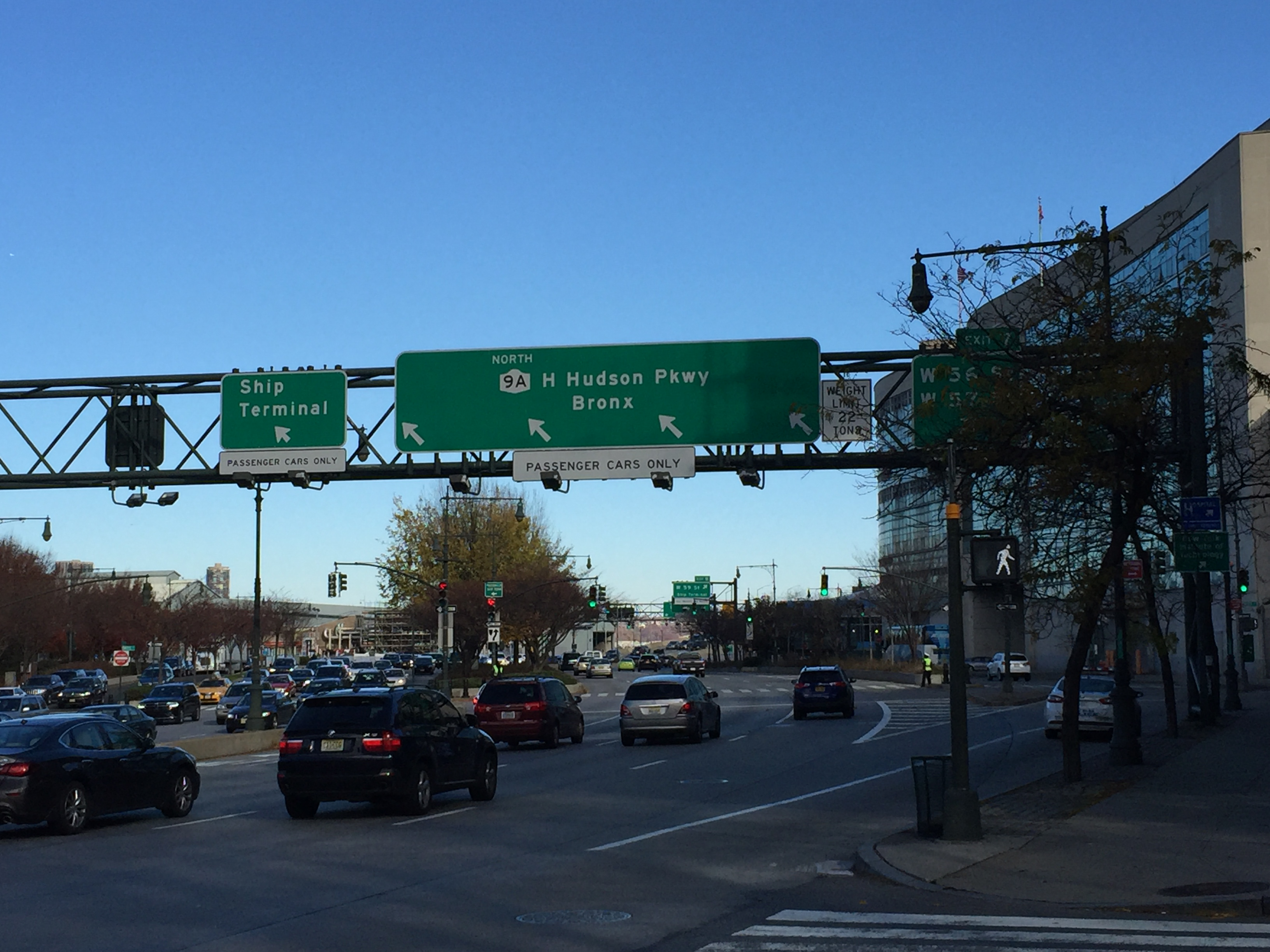
Approaching the Henry Hudson Parkway from the West Side Highway, near 57th Street

In March 1934, the New York State Legislature approved the Henry Hudson Parkway. Work on the parkway began in February 1935; the project was funded by a $3.1 million bond issue. The portion of the parkway north of Dyckman Street opened on December 12, 1936, and the portion south of the George Washington Bridge opened on October 10, 1937. The section of Riverside Drive between the George Washington Bridge and Dyckman Street was incorporated into the northbound roadway of Henry Hudson Parkway. A parallel southbound roadway for the Henry Hudson Parkway was built between these two points; it opened in January 1938.

The parkway ultimately cost $109 million, twice as expensive as the $49 million Hoover Dam that was built in the same period. The Parkway was part of Robert Moses's "West Side Improvement" and included covering the New York Central Railroad's West Side Line, creating the Freedom Tunnel. The covered portion is partially used for the highway and also expands the Riverside Park designed by Frederick Law Olmsted.

In the late 1940s, new breakdown lanes were constructed in order to improve safety. However, these were not constructed throughout the entire highway. In 1965, Moses proposed constructing a two-lane reversible roadway along the Henry Hudson Parkway between 59th Street and the George Washington Bridge for $160 million. Had the roadway been built, there would have been no intermediate exits.

As part of a $2.5 billion statewide bond issue in 1971, there was also a proposal to widen the Henry Hudson Parkway south of the George Washington Bridge to an eight-lane expressway in 1971. Local politicians opposed the proposal because it would require seizing parts of Riverside Park. The widening was canceled after state legislators introduced an amendment to prevent the seizure of any parkland.

=== 21st century ===
On May 12, 2005, part of a retaining wall at Castle Village collapsed onto the northbound lanes of the parkway, just north of the George Washington Bridge, shutting it down shortly before rush hour. The clean-up began quickly, and the road re-opened on May 15. The Henry Hudson Parkway is a candidate for designation as a New York State Scenic Byway, the first in New York City. At the request of the Henry Hudson Parkway Task Force, in 2005 the New York Metropolitan Transportation Council approved funding to develop a comprehensive corridor management plan, a requirement for its designation.

== Exit list ==
County	Location	mi	km	Exit	Destinations	Notes
Manhattan	Riverside South	0.00	0.00	–	NY 9A south (West Side Highway) – Battery Park	Continuation south; southern end of NY 9A concurrency
Manhattan	Riverside South	0.00	0.00	9	West 72nd Street	Northbound entrance only
Manhattan	Riverside Park	0.31	0.50	10	West 79th Street – Boat Basin	Signed as exits 10A (79th Street) and 10B (Boat Basin) northbound; exit number not signed southbound
Manhattan	Riverside Park	1.14	1.83	11	West 95th Street	Southbound exit only; exit number not signed
Manhattan	Riverside Park	1.14	1.83	11	West 96th Street	No southbound exit; exit number not signed
Manhattan	Harlem	2.27	3.65	12	West 125th Street	Exit number not signed northbound
Manhattan	Hamilton Heights	4.07	6.55	13	West 158th Street	
Manhattan	Fort Washington Park	4.72	7.60	14	I-95 (George Washington Bridge) / Riverside Drive / West 178th Street – Cross Bronx Expressway	No northbound access to Riverside Drive; West 178th Street not signed southbound; exit 1A on I-95
Manhattan	Fort Washington Park	4.97	8.00	15	Riverside Drive south	Northbound exit and entrance
Manhattan	Fort Tryon Park	6.4	10.3	16	Fort Tryon Park, Cloisters	Northbound exit and entrance; access via Fort Tryon Place
Manhattan	Inwood Hill Park			17	To Dyckman Street	No southbound exit; access via Riverside Drive; last northbound exit before toll
Manhattan	Inwood Hill Park	6.76	10.88	17	Dyckman Street	Southbound exit only
Spuyten Duyvil Creek (Harlem River)		7.38– 7.60	11.88– 12.23	Henry Hudson Bridge (E-ZPass or Toll-by-Mail)		
The Bronx	Spuyten Duyvil	7.84	12.62	18	Kappock Street	No entrance ramps; last southbound exit before toll
The Bronx	Spuyten Duyvil	8.2	13.2	19	West 232nd Street	
The Bronx	Riverdale	8.6	13.8	20	West 237th Street / West 239th Street	Signed for 237th Street southbound, 239th Street northbound
The Bronx	Riverdale	9.0	14.5	21	West 246th Street	No southbound entrance
The Bronx	Riverdale	9.46	15.22	22	West 253rd Street / West 254th Street / Riverdale Avenue	Signed for 253rd Street northbound, 254th Street southbound
The Bronx	Fieldston	9.93	15.98	23	US 9 / NY 9A north (Broadway)	Northern end of NY 9A concurrency; signed as exits 23A (south) and 23B (north) northbound
The Bronx	Van Cortlandt Park	10.45	16.82	24	Mosholu Parkway south to I-87 south (Major Deegan Expressway)	I-87 not signed northbound; northern terminus of Mosholu Parkway
Bronx–Westchester county line	Van Cortlandt Park–Yonkers line	10.95	17.62	–	Saw Mill River Parkway north – Yonkers	Continuation north
1.000 mi = 1.609 km; 1.000 km = 0.621 mi: Concurrency terminus; Electronic toll collection; Incomplete access
