= Fort Cockhill =

Coordinates: 40.877204°N 73.924309°W

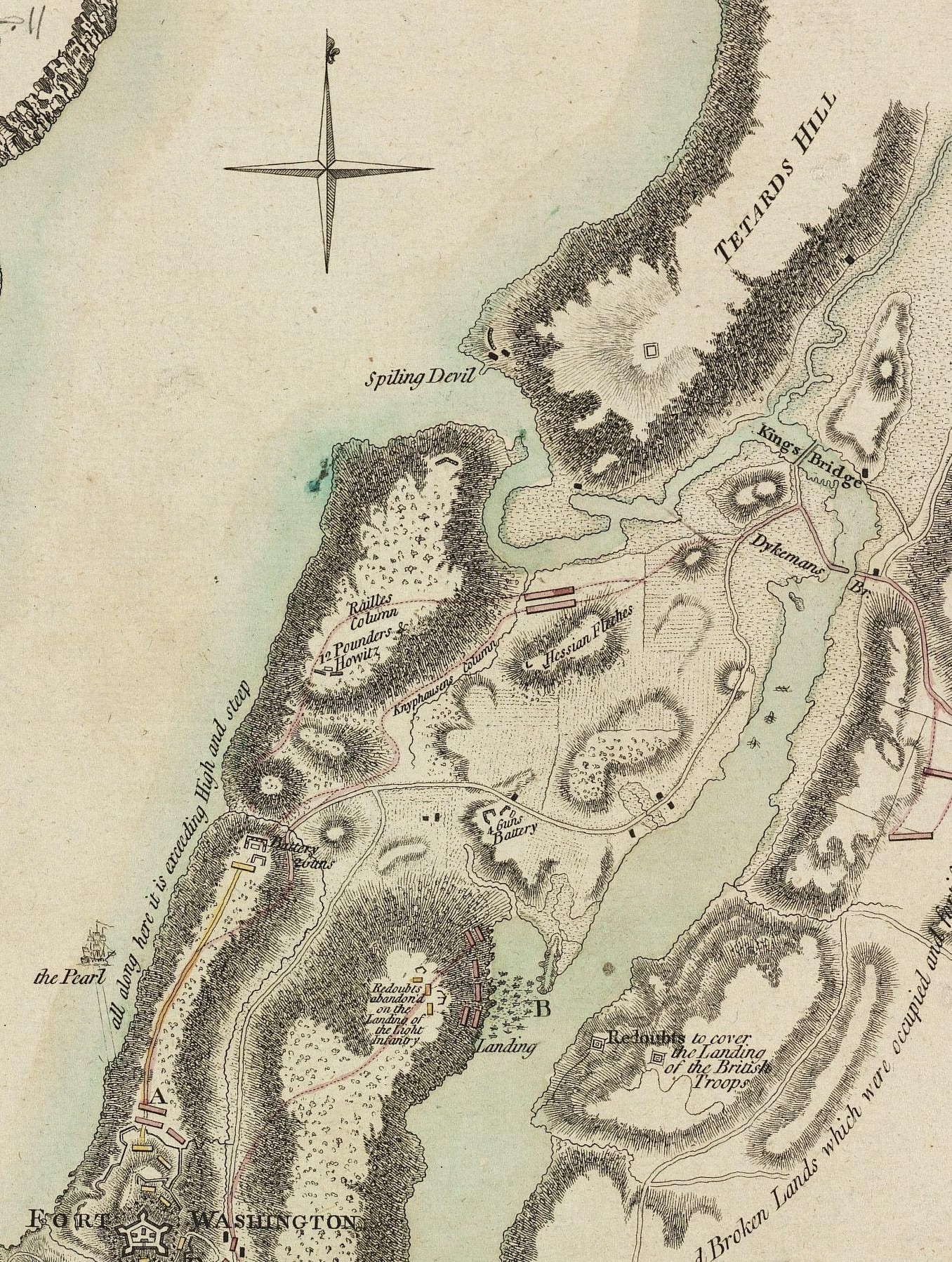
Map showing the locations of the northern Manhattan fortifications of the Continental Army

Fort Cockhill was an 18th-century military fortification located on Cox's Hill or Tubby Hook Hill, now known as the present-day Inwood Hill Park in Manhattan, New York City. A small, circular earthwork structure, in height some ten or twelve feet and equipped with two cannon, it was situated at the northwestern extremity of Tubby Hook Hill, at a point overlooking both the Hudson River and the Harlem River valley.

Built by the Continental Army during the Revolutionary War, Fort Cockhill, an outpost of Fort Tryon (which was itself an outpost of Fort Washington to the south), along with a strongly fortified position on Laurel Hill (renamed Fort George after capture by the British), and a four-gun redoubt commanding the Kingsbridge Road, both to the east, provided the rebel defense of the then-sparsely populated northern Manhattan.

On the morning of November 16, 1776, during what became known as The Battle of Fort Washington, the fort was attacked and captured by a battalion of Hessian (German) Grenadiers who served in the British Army.

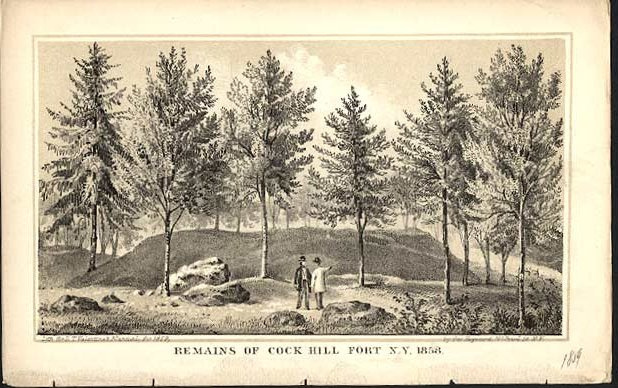
19th Century drawing of the remains of Fort Cockhill

In July 1781, George Washington and his generals surveyed the forts of northern Manhattan from nearby points in the Bronx, apparently in preparation to reclaim their captured forts. By that time the fort showed signs of neglect, as reflected in Washington's observation that:

The fort on Cox’s Hill was in bad repair and but little dependence placed on it. There is neither ditch nor friezing, and the northeast corner appears quite easy of access.

This attack never materialized, and the fort was held by the British until the war ended in 1783.
