= Dyckman Street Fault =

Seismologically active fault in the northern part of Manhattan Island

The Dyckman Street Fault is a seismologically active fault in New York City which runs parallel along the southern border of Inwood Hill Park, crossing the Harlem River and into Morris Heights.

As recently as 1989, activity of this fault caused a magnitude 2 earthquake.
