= Inwood Hill Park =

Public park in Manhattan, New York

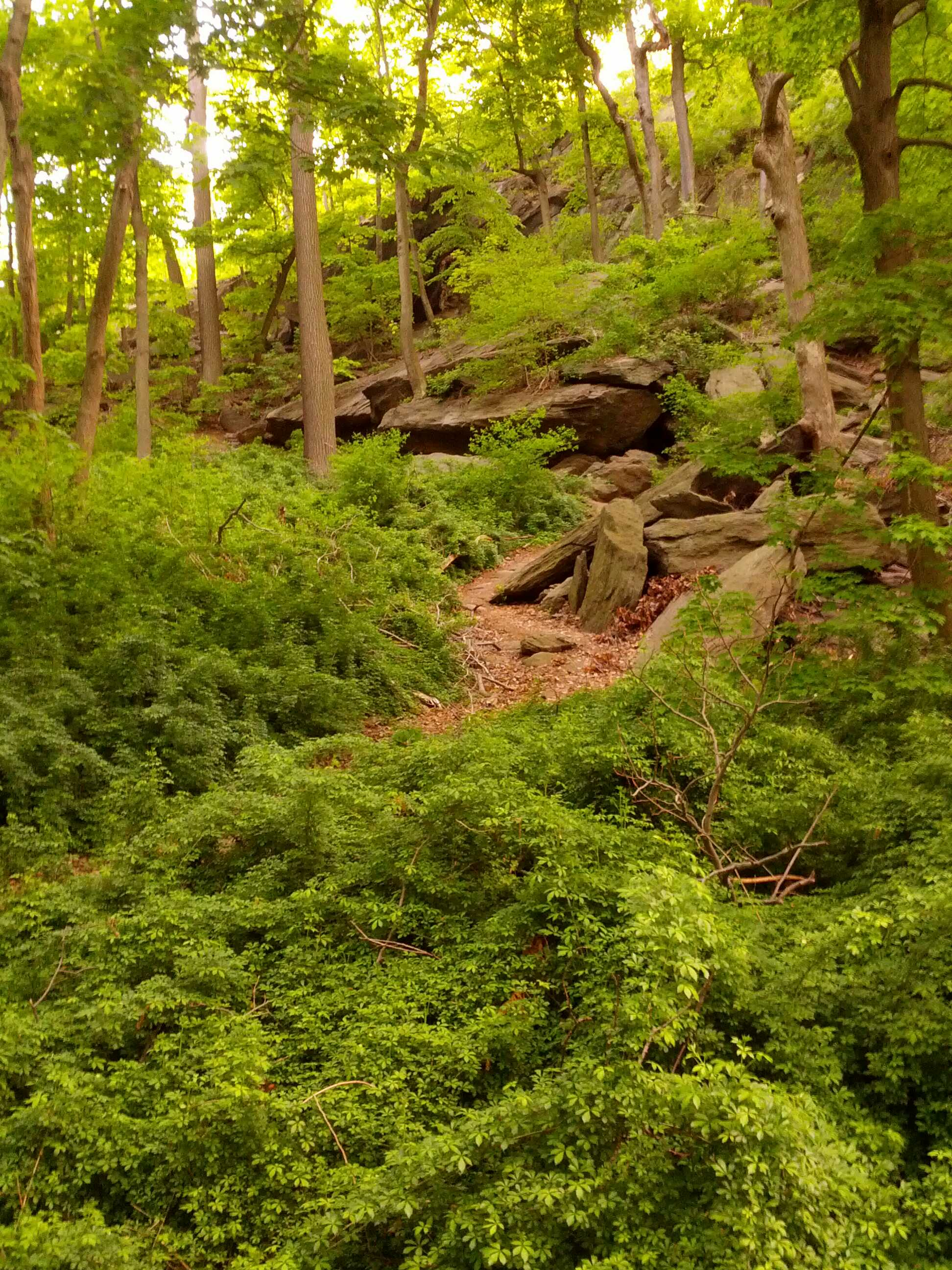
- Rock formations (used as Wecquaesgeek dwellings)
- Interactive map of Inwood Hill Park
- Type: Urban park
- Location: Inwood, Manhattan, New York City
- Coordinates: 40.8725°N 73.9250°W
- Area: 196.4 acres (79.5 ha)
- Created: 1926
- Operator: New York City Department of Parks and Recreation

Inwood Hill Park is a 196 acres (79 ha) public park in the Inwood neighborhood of Manhattan, New York City, operated by the New York City Department of Parks and Recreation. On a high schist ridge that rises 200 feet (61 m) above the Hudson River from Dyckman Street to the northern tip of the island, Inwood Hill Park's densely folded, glacially scoured topography contains the largest remaining old-growth forest on the island of Manhattan. The area is also known as the Shorakapkok Preserve, shorakapkok meaning 'the sitting place' in the Munsee language used by the Wecquaesgeek tribe who inhabited the area for nearly 700 years. Unlike other Manhattan parks, Inwood Hill Park is largely composed of natural areas, consisting of mostly wooded, non-landscaped hills.

== History ==
=== Site ===
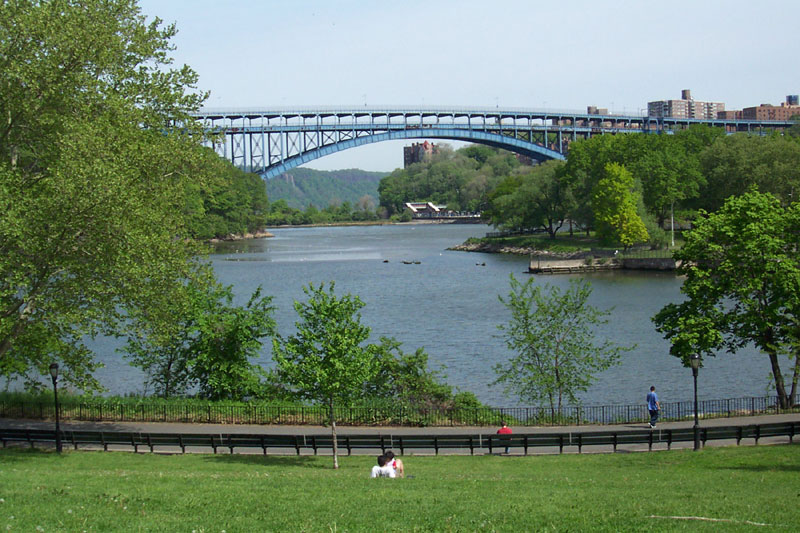
Looking at the Henry Hudson Bridge from the park along Spuyten Duyvil Creek

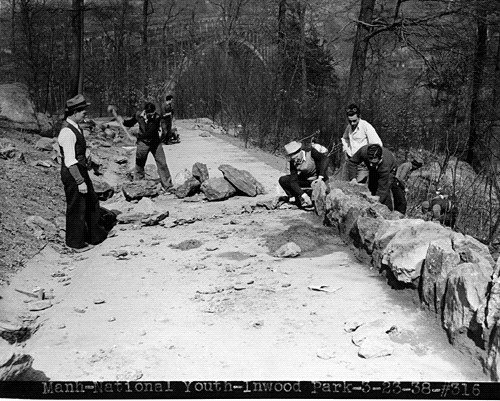
WPA workers constructing a paved pathway in Inwood Hill Park (1938)

Inwood Hill Park has a human history that goes back to the pre-Columbian era. Through the 17th century, the Wecquaesgeek, a Munsee-speaking band of Wappinger people, inhabited the area. There is evidence of a main encampment along the eastern edge of the park, known as the village of Shorakapok. The Wecquaesgeek relied on both the Hudson and Harlem Rivers as sources for food. Artifacts and the remains of old campfires were found in Inwood's rock shelters, suggesting their use for shelter and temporary living quarters.

Fort Cockhill, one of many forts built in New York by the Continental Army during the American Revolutionary War, stood in the northwestern extremity of the park. A small, five-sided earthen structure equipped with two cannons, it overlooked the mouth of Spuyten Duyvil Creek at its confluence with the Hudson River. At the time, the area was known from colonial to post–Revolutionary War times as Cox's Hill or Tubby Hook Hill.

European colonization introduced numerous farm and garden weeds, such as dandelions and the common plantain; they cleared the forest and established farms, including the planting of orchards and herbs. Both the British and American troops burned the forests of what would become Inwood Hill Park during the Revolutionary War.

Even though the area which is now Inwood Hill Park was the site of one of the last farms in Manhattan – which lasted to at least c. 1890 – by the 19th century, it was largely the location of country retreats for some of the wealthier families of the community and the rest of New York's social elite. One such notable who had a summer estate in Inwood was Isidor Straus, co-owner of the Macy's department store and a passenger on the ill-fated voyage of the Titanic. The Lords of the Lord & Taylor department store chain owned two mansions built within the park; both mansions were destroyed by fire in the latter part of the 19th century. Additionally, an orphanage was located high on a bluff in what is now Inwood Hill Park in the nineteenth century. The site today includes a small paved area and park benches; no trace of the building remains. At least three freshwater springs arise in the park, one of which was used for drinking water by the workers who constructed the Henry Hudson Bridge. Some land in the north was formerly known as Cold Spring.

Historically, the area now encompassed by Inwood Hill Park has been largely unaffected by development.

=== Use as park ===
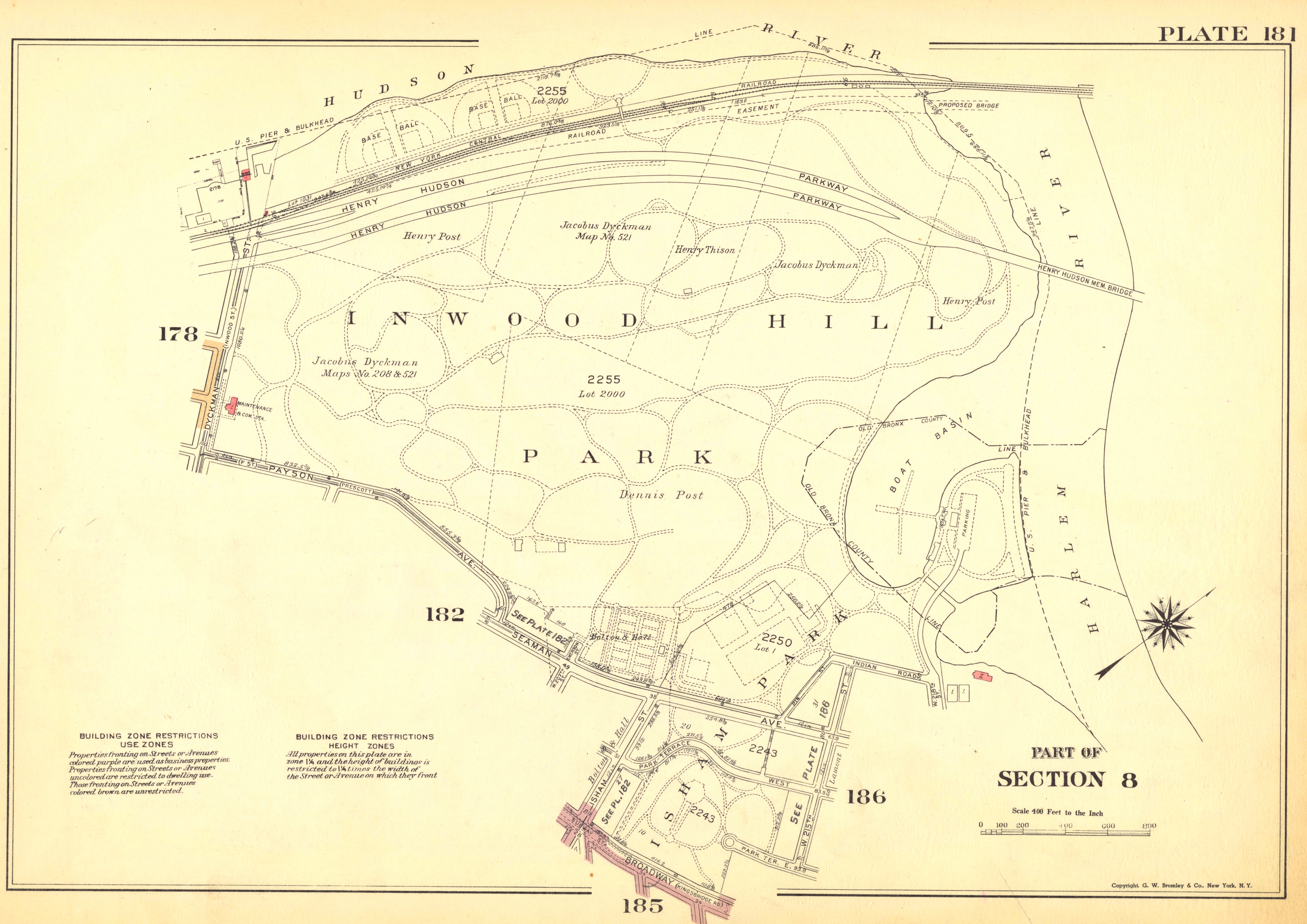
Park map, circa 1955, Bromley

Andrew Haswell Green, an early commissioner of the Department of Parks and Recreation, first suggested that a park be created in Inwood in 1895 for the newly formed department. His idea did not gain traction quickly, but the archeological finds in the area by individuals such as Reginald Pelham Bolton, the unique geology of the hill, historical associations (both true and merely rumored), the beauty of the landscape, and the views to be seen from it finally brought the city around. Between 1915 and the early 1940s, it purchased parcels of land that make up the park as it is today.

The park was officially opened on May 8, 1926. Squatters who lived in the abandoned estates around the perimeter of the park were removed in the 1930s by Robert Moses and the Works Project Administration (WPA). Moses built the West Side Highway, which cuts directly through the park, and cut many of the historic tulip trees which dated back to the Revolutionary War. The WPA also paved over some trails and illuminated them with lampposts, many of which are now in need of repair. Arson and dumping have damaged the park and its integrity, as have erosion-control measures which were not well conceived.

In 1992, the central, old-growth forest area was designated as Shorakapok Preserve.

On September 15, 1995, the Inwood Hill Nature Center was dedicated and opened to the public. It is located near the park entrance on 218th Street and Indian Road, and is on a peninsula that was formerly connected to the Bronx mainland before the digging of the Harlem River Ship Canal. The center has been designated as an interactive exhibit with ongoing monitoring of the natural area. It is also the focal point to watch the eagles that have been placed in the park to be freed when they are able to adjust to the environment. The center was damaged by Superstorm Sandy's floodwaters in 2012, and was only partially reopened twelve years later, in 2024.

Next to the Nature Center is Muscota Marsh, one of the few remaining saltwater marshes in Manhattan.

=== Great Tulip Tree and Shorakapok Rock ===
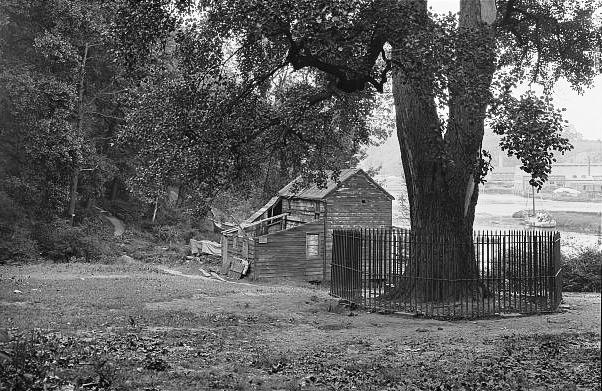
Tulip tree under which legend says that Native Americans sold Manhattan to Peter Minuit in 1626

The park's Shorakapok Preserve was formerly the site of a "Great Tulip Tree", a Liriodendron tulipifera considered the largest tree on Manhattan, as well as one of the oldest, and was championed and restored by Parks Commissioner Charles B. Stover. As part of care for the tree, a plaque was put up connecting it to Hudson's voyages, a few years after the Hudson–Fulton Celebration, commemorating the 300th anniversary of Hudson's work and the 100th anniversary of Fulton's. The original plaque also connected the tree to Native American archaeological finds nearby, speculating that some of the Native Americans at Shorakapok could have interacted with Hudson. Hudson actually engaged in a battle from his ship with Native Americans at nearby Nipinichsen, just north of Spuyten Duyvil Creek, on October 2, 1609. The tree survived for centuries until it was felled by a storm in 1933.

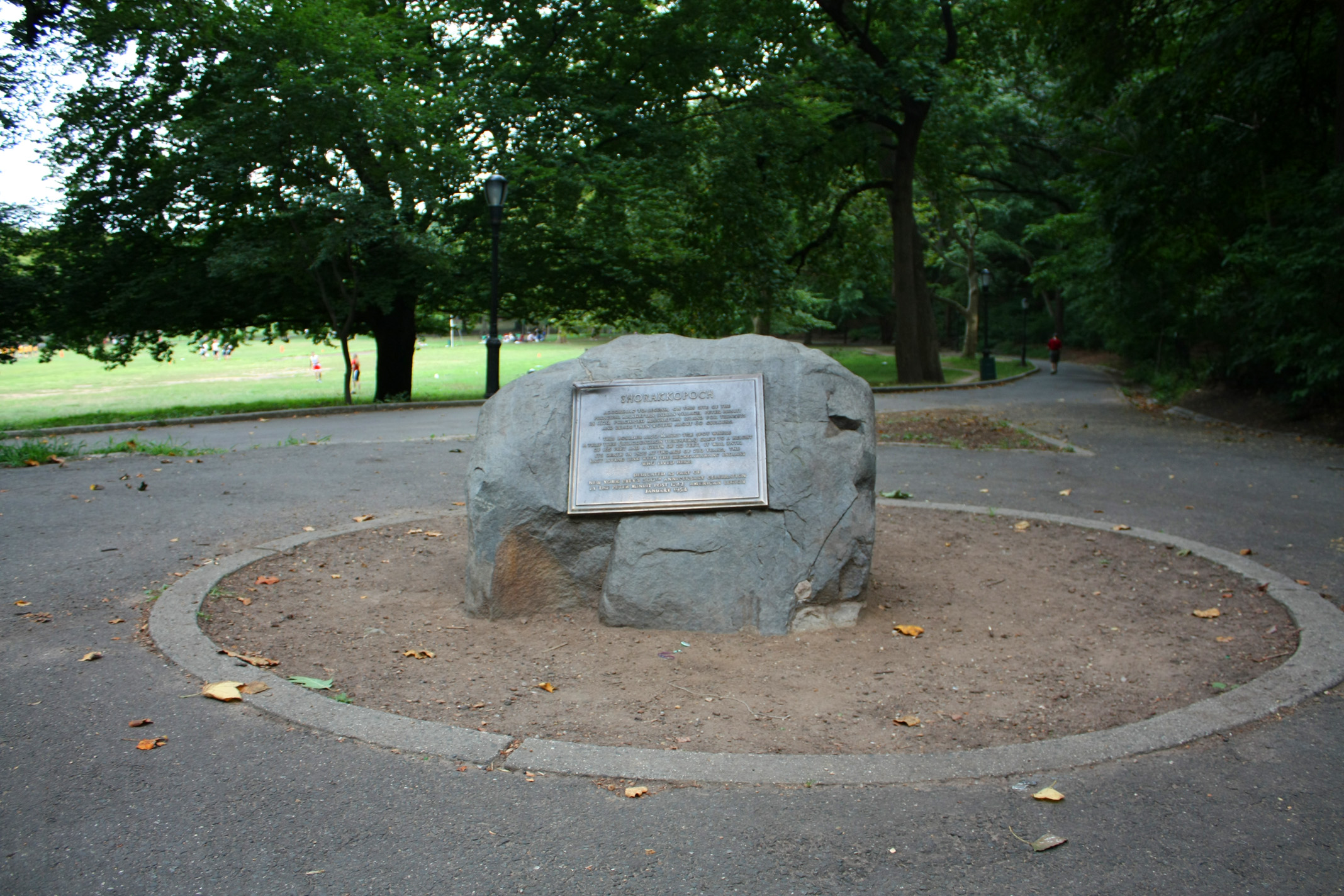
Shorakkopoch Rock

Until the 1950s the stump was still to be seen, surrounded by a large iron fence, but as it rotted it was finally removed and a boulder and plaque replaced it. Peter Minuit Post 1247 of the American Legion placed the boulder and the plaque in 1954, commemorating the 300th anniversary of New Amsterdam gaining municipal rights a year earlier. The plaque labels the boulder "Shorakkopoch" (a more recent Parks Department sign nearby calls it "Shorakapok Rock"), and claims that "according to legend" this is where Minuit negotiated the purchase of Manhattan Island from Native Americans. The account does not appear in any historical records, and some historians place any such meeting location in Lower Manhattan. The association of a "treaty tree" in different locations with land acquisition has been noted as a common myth that promotes a narrative of peaceful colonial settlement.

== Geography ==
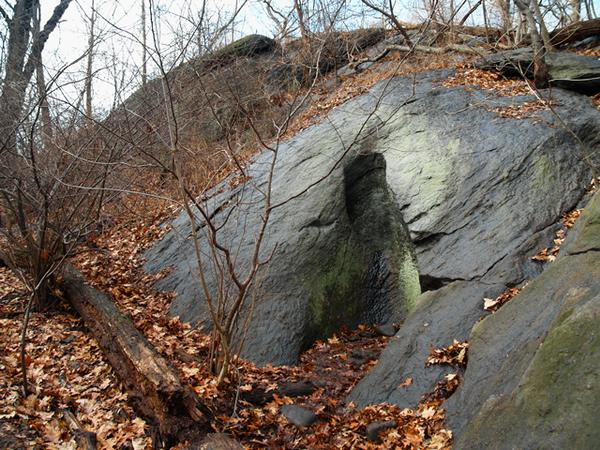
The largest glacial pothole in New York City is located in Inwood Hill Park.

The park covers 196 acres (79 ha). The Henry Hudson Parkway and Amtrak's Empire Connection railroad line run through it, and at its northern end the Henry Hudson Bridge and the rail-only Spuyten Duyvil Bridge link Manhattan to the Bronx.

The park's western boundary is the Hudson River, and the southern boundary is Dyckman Street. From Dyckman to 204th Street the eastern boundary is Payson Avenue, from 204th to 214th Street it is Seaman Avenue, and from 215th Street to the park's end at 218th Street the eastern boundary is Indian Road. 10 miles (16 km) of footpaths criss-cross the park, allowing easy access to Dyckman Street, Fort Tryon Park, Fort Washington Park, and Riverside Park – part of the Manhattan Waterfront Greenway. Some of these trails are former roads leading to what were once summer estates that later were brought under the control of the city in the creation of the park. Bolton Road, which was the main drive to the Bolton estate, is now the primary pedestrian pathway within the park; its entrance marked by a sign located on Payson Avenue.

In 1919, New York State passed a bill in order to straighten the western end of Spuyten Duyvil Creek feeding into the Hudson. At the time, the creek was diverted south to avoid a peninsula that housed the Johnson Iron Works foundry. The foundry held out until 1923 when it vacated the premises. These plans were finalized in 1935, and the channel was excavated from 1937 to 1938, turning the creek into the Harlem River Ship Canal. The work severed the Johnson foundry's 13.5-acre (5.5 ha) peninsula of land from the Bronx, which was then absorbed into Inwood Hill Park; the former peninsula now contains the park's Nature Center.

Inwood Hill Park is geologically diverse, with marble, schist, and limestone all prevalent in the area. The park is next to the seismologically active Dyckman Street Fault which runs parallel along the southern border of the park. As recently as 1989, activity of this fault caused a magnitude 2 earthquake.

== Fauna and flora ==
One of the earliest known records of the flora of Inwood was recorded by W. W. Denslow, then a resident of Inwood, around 1863. The Torrey Botanical Society, newly formed in 1867, noted several orchid species growing on the west slopes of a ridge in Inwood, as well as around Spuyten Duyvil, including a small colony of Tipularia discolor, that the group scrupulously cared for. Denslow also recorded two uncommon species of Habenaria in the salt marshes around Inwood.

The forest of Inwood Hill Park is within a region once designated as an oak-chestnut forest. Due to the demise of the American chestnut due to chestnut blight, the forest composition has altered drastically since 1917 and is now oak-hickory dominated.

The area of the park along the Harlem River includes Muscota Marsh, one of Manhattan's last remaining natural salt marshes, the other being Smuggler's Cove, which attracts large numbers of waterbirds. These waterfowl can be studied further via educational programs held at the Nature Center at the north end of the property. Mallards, Canada geese and ring-billed gulls are year-round residents, using both the water and the nearby lawns and ball fields. Many wading birds and waterfowl pass through on the spring and fall migrations, and herons and cormorants often spend the summer. The salt marsh is also home to many fish, mollusks, and crustaceans which live among the cordgrass and bulrushes, which can tolerate both salt and fresh water.

The woods support a wide variety of birds, including common species such as blue jays and cardinals, as well as wild turkeys. Birds of prey that breed in the park include red-tailed hawks and owls. A five-year project that began in summer 2002 attempted to reintroduce the bald eagle to Manhattan using hacking boxes in the park and eaglets brought in from the Midwest. In the first summer, three of the four introduced eaglets fledged successfully; three or four fledged each year of the program. The nesting structure was removed in 2009.

Animals found in the park include Eastern and meadow voles, red-bellied salamanders, southern flying squirrels, opossums, white-footed deer mice, and cottontail rabbits, as well as the expected eastern grey squirrels and raccoons. Foxes were also once residents, but the increasing number of coyotes spotted in Central Park and in the Bronx's Van Cortlandt Park may account for the foxes' apparent current absence.

Although the park does not support large wild mammals, the local wildlife does include raccoons and skunks as well as rodents typical to large urban areas. Residents and non-residents alike hunt for fish from the riverbank at the north end of the park.

The park has both native and invasive plant species. While the presence of plant life is obvious, the fauna may not be as revealing.

=== Native and non-native species ===
Native species from nurseries were added to the park to provide greater vegetation, such as Abies balsamea, Acer rubrum, A. saccharum, Aesculus, and Betula lenta. Non-native species were also introduced to the park, affecting the native species. Some of the non-native species present were Rubus phoenicolasius (once rare and now the most prevalent Rubus species in the park), paper mulberry (L) Vent., Morus alba L, and Paulownia tomentosa (Thund.) Steudel. In the 1930s, a total of 83 species were found, of which 32 were non-native species.

Nearly all of the orchid species reported by Denslow in Manhattan and what is now the Bronx had disappeared by the turn of the 20th century. The only species of orchid still found in Inwood Hill Park is Epipactis helleborine, an introduced and invasive species which is native to Europe.

== Usage ==
The park contains three playgrounds, baseball and soccer fields, and tennis and basketball courts. The Inwood Hill Nature Center at the north end of the park is both a location for educational programs and the local headquarters of the Urban Park Rangers. Inwood Hill Park's ball-fields are heavily used by local and other city leagues during the baseball season. This usage places extreme pressure on the park, which, as a result, has required more active management in recent years.

Inwood Hill Park also has facilities for barbecuing, a dogs run, and kayak and canoe launches. The park highlights specific activities that contribute to the park usage such as the hiking trail and the Hudson River Bike Trail.

The lack of green space in the eastern part of Inwood and the Bronx nearby creates an enormous demand for picnicking with barbecues and table/chair setups, activity that is either illegal or tightly controlled in most other city parks; however, Inwood Hill Park has managed this by permitting such setups on the manicured, maintained peninsula portion of the park.

New York Road Runners hosts a weekly 2.75-mile Open Run.

== Economic impact ==
Urban parks have a significant economic impact on surrounding communities. The development and evolution of Inwood Hill Park's flora and fauna are intrinsically linked to the financial stability of New York City City and its residents. Fiscal investments of the state have a significant impact on the health and species diversity of flora and fauna in New York city parks. During the New York fiscal crisis in 1975, the New York state government decided it would be prudent to cut funding for the maintenance of New York parks and redistribute the money to other areas of public and private services. Consequently, many public workers in New York City parks were laid off. The Protected Native Plants Program was created in 1989 to provide regulatory protection for native New York state plants and was subsequently updated in 2012 in accordance with new data provided by the New York Natural Heritage Program.

In contrast to more visited parks such as Central Park, which receive a substantial amount of funding from donations from the surrounding community, a majority of Inwood Hill Park's funding is provided by a combination of grants and property taxes, common methods of funding parks in low-income areas. Partnerships for Parks, a nonprofit organization, has partnered with the city of New York to maintain and manage parks and promote their use.

The Clean Water, Clean Air, and Green Jobs Environmental Bond Act passed as a ballot initiative in the November 2022 New York state general election. As part of this approved initiative, New York plans to set aside $4.2 billion in order to enhance, allocate and redevelop the natural landscape and environment of the state. Of these funds, $650 million will be allocated to parks, open spaces, and agricultural lands. This will involve the purchase of land for conservation, restoration/beautification of parks, and the expansion of the proportion of state-owned land. It is expected that the Bond Act will result in the creation of approximately 84,000 jobs. A six- to nine-month training program designed to provide employees with an understanding of the environment will be provided by the Parks Opportunities Program, and will include training on soil composition, tree types, and plant and animal species.

== In popular culture ==
The park is a central location in the 2013 science fiction novel The Orion Plan, due to its being a low-population area of a brightly lit city.

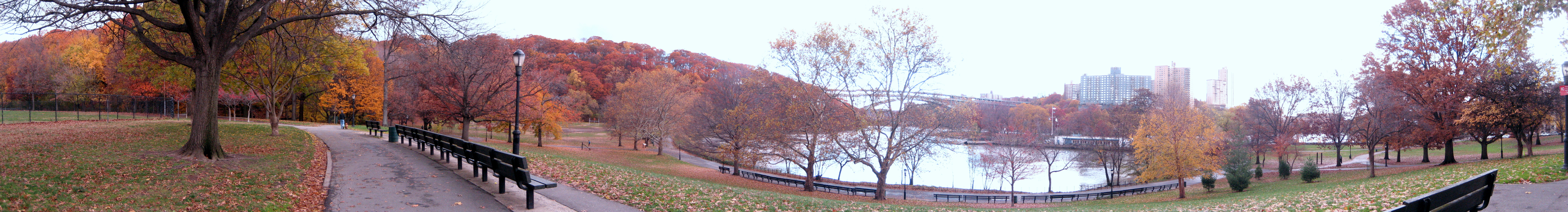
Panorama of the park in fall
