= Spuyten Duyvil Creek =

Tidal estuary in New York City

Coordinates: 40°52′30″N 73°55′5″W

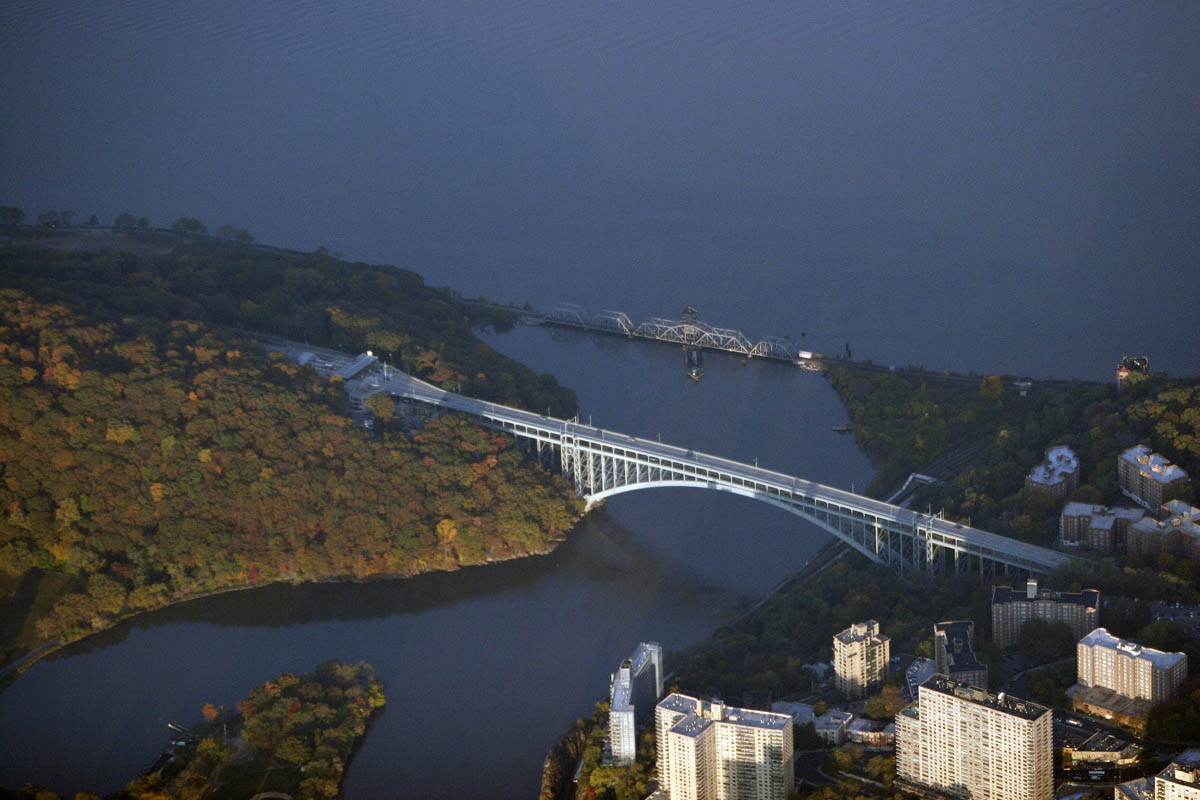
The mouth of the Spuyten Duyvil Creek with the Henry Hudson Bridge (foreground) and the railroad's Spuyten Duyvil Bridge in the background

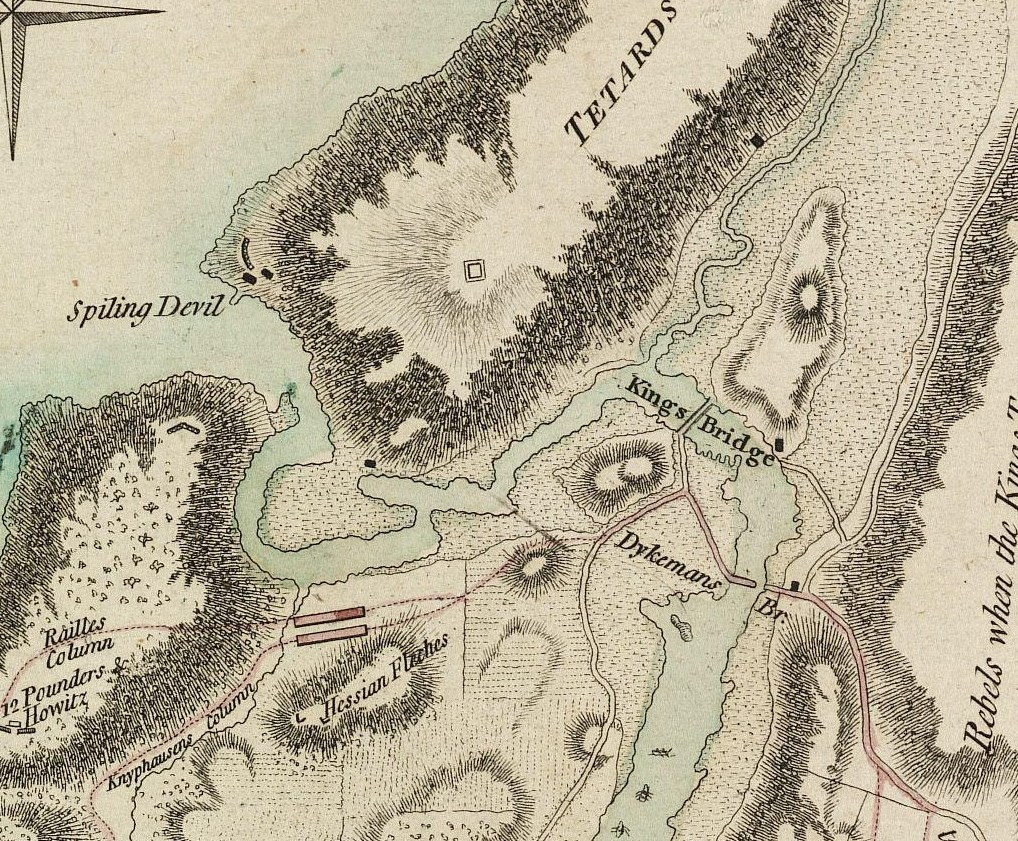
Spuyten Duyvil Creek, King's Bridge, and Marble Hill area, 1777 military map

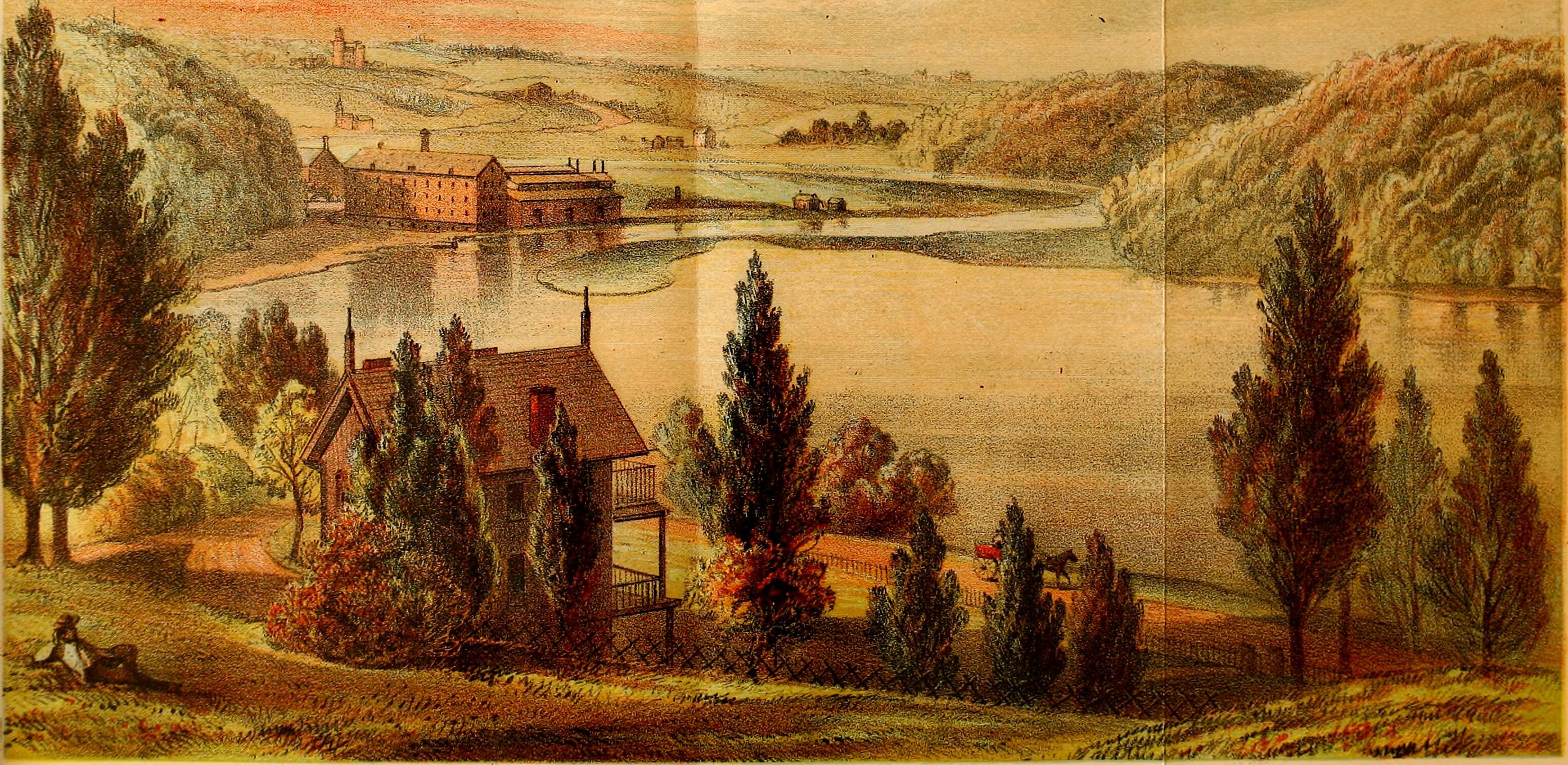
1842 view

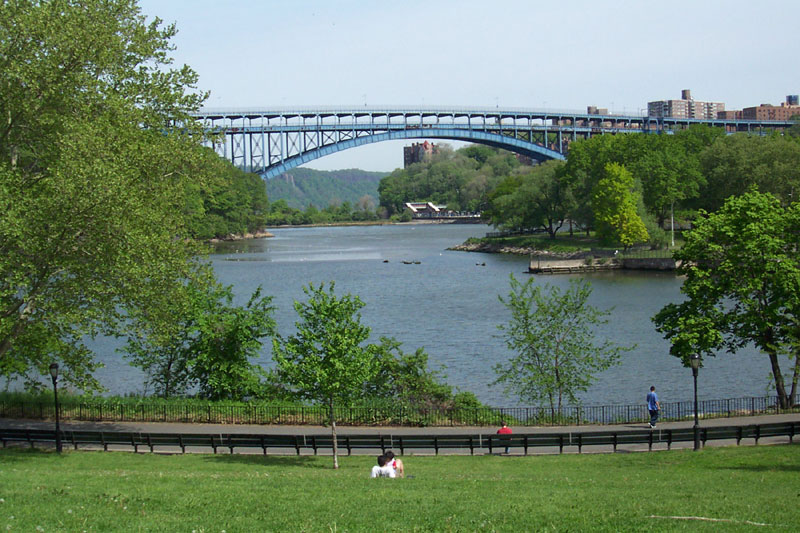
What was a southern meander of Spuyten Duyvil Creek is now a bay in Inwood Park.

Spuyten Duyvil Creek (/ˈspaɪtən ˈdaɪvəl/) is a short tidal estuary in New York City connecting the Hudson River to the Harlem River Ship Canal and then on to the Harlem River. The confluence of the three water bodies separate the island of Manhattan from the Bronx and the rest of the mainland. Once a distinct, turbulent waterway between the Hudson and Harlem rivers, the creek has been subsumed by the modern ship canal.

The Bronx neighborhood of Spuyten Duyvil lies to the north of the estuary creek, and the adjacent Manhattan neighborhood of Marble Hill lies to the north of the Ship Canal.

== Etymology ==
The earliest use of the name "Spuyten Duyvil" was in 1653, in a document from Dutch landowner Adriaen van der Donck to the Dutch West India Company. It may be literally translated as "Spouting Devil" or Spuitende Duivel in Dutch; a reference to the strong and wild tidal currents found at that location. It may also be translated as "Spewing Devil" or "Spinning Devil", or more loosely as "Devil's Whirlpool" or "Devil's Spate." Spui is a Dutch word involving outlets for water. Historian Reginald Pelham Bolton, however, argues that the phrase means "sprouting meadow", referring to a fresh-water spring. A folk etymology, "to spite the Devil" or "in spite of the devil", was popularized by a story in Washington Irving's A Knickerbocker's History of New York published in 1809. Set in the 17th century, the story tells of fictional trumpeter Anthony Van Corlaer summoned by Dutch colonial governor Peter Stuyvesant to warn settlers of a British invasion attempt, with Corlaer attempting to swim across the creek in treacherous conditions.

An extensive appendix to Studies in Etymology and Etiology: With Emphasis on Germanic, Jewish, Romance and Slavic Languages (2009) by David L. Gold, which includes commentary by Rob Rentenaar, professor of onomastics at the University of Amsterdam, goes into great detail about all the various translations for "Spuyten Duyvil" which have been mooted over the years. Rentenaar concludes that "Duyvil" means "devil", either literally or in a transferred sense, but he could not determine what the intended meaning of "Spuyten" was because of the many variants that have been used throughout history.

The local Lenape Native Americans referred to the creek by several names. The first was Shorakapok or Shorackhappok, translated as "the sitting down place" or "the place between the ridges". A second term, spelled various ways including Paparinemo or Papiriniman, was shared with a triangular island formed by the junction of the creek and Tibbetts Brook in today's Kingsbridge neighborhood. The word has been translated as "place where the stream is shut" or to "parcel out" or "divide". A third name, Muscoota, was also used.

== History ==
=== Early history ===
Spuyten Duyvil Creek was originally a narrow tidal strait connecting the Hudson River to the west and the headwaters of the Harlem River to the east, both of which were fed by the waters of Tibbetts Brook flowing south from the Bronx. When the Dutch settlers arrived they found its tidal waters turbulent and difficult to handle. Though its tides raced, there was no navigable watercourse joining it with the headwaters of the Harlem River, which flowed in an S-shaped course southwest and then north into the East River. Steep cliffs along the Spuyten Duyvil's mouth at the Hudson prevented any bridge there, but upstream it narrowed into a rocky drainage. Prior to the development of the Bronx, the creek was fed by Tibbetts Brook, which begins in Yonkers, Westchester County, and intersected with the creek at modern West 230th Street. The brook currently ends above ground within Van Cortlandt Park, emptying into the Harlem River system at the Wards Island Water Pollution Control Plant via underground sewers.

During the 17th century, the only mode of transportation across the Harlem River was by ferry from the east end of 125th Street. The ferry was established in 1667 and operated by Johannes Verveelen, a local landowner. Many settlers circumvented the toll for the ferry by crossing the creek from northern Marble Hill to modern Kingsbridge, Bronx, a point where it was feasible to wade or swim through the waters. This area was known as the "wading place", and had previously been used by Native Americans. In response, Verveelen had the creek fenced off at the wading place, though travelers simply tore the barrier down. In 1669 Verveelen transplanted his ferry to the northern tip of Marble Hill, at today's Broadway and West 231st Street.

In 1693 Frederick Philipse, a powerful Dutch landowner who had sworn allegiance to the Crown upon the British takeover of Dutch New Netherlands, built the King's Bridge at Marble Hill near what is now West 230th Street in the Bronx. Originally a merchant in New Amsterdam, Philipse had purchased vast landholdings in what was then Westchester County. Granted the title Lord of Philipse Manor, he established a plantation and provisioning depot for his shipping business upriver on the Hudson in present-day Sleepy Hollow. His toll bridge provided access and opened his land to settlement. Later, it carried the Boston Post Road. In 1758, the Free Bridge was erected by Jacob Dyckman, opening on January 1, 1759. Stagecoach service was later established across the span. The new bridge proceeded to take much of the traffic away from the King's Bridge. The Free Bridge was destroyed during the American Revolution. Following the war, Philipse Manor was forfeited to the state legislature, after which the King's Bridge was free.

=== Harlem River Ship Canal ===
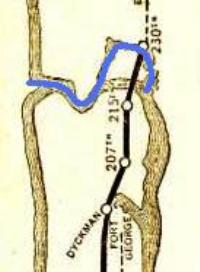
Blue shows the original path of the creek, north around Marble Hill and then curving south toward the Harlem River

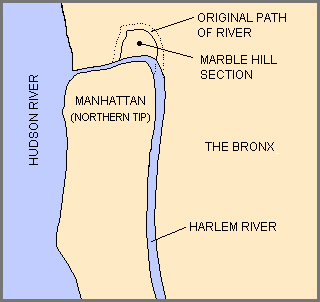
Marble Hill was cut off from Manhattan except for the Broadway Bridge when the Harlem River Ship Canal straightened the creek. A small piece of the Bronx later became part of Manhattan Island (not marked on this map).

Over time the channels of the Spuyten Duyvil and Harlem River were joined and widened and additional bridges were constructed, but maritime transit was still difficult and confined to small craft. By 1817, a narrow canal was dug through the south end of Marble Hill at approximately 222nd Street, known as "Boltons' Canal" or "Dyckman Canal".

With the completion of the Erie Canal in 1825, and the advent of large steamships in the second half of the 19th century, a broad shipping canal was proposed between the Harlem and Hudson Rivers to allow them thru-transit by bypassing the tight turn up and around Marble Hill. The Harlem Canal Company (then stylized as the "Harlaem Canal Company") was founded in 1826, but did not make any progress towards building a canal. A second company also failed to complete the project. In 1863 the Hudson and Harlem River Canal Company was created, and began the final plans for the canal. The U.S. Congress broke the logjam in 1873 by appropriating money for a survey of the relevant area, following which New York state bought the necessary land and gave it to the federal government. In 1876, the New York State Legislature issued a decree for the construction of the canal. Construction of the Harlem River Ship Canal – officially the United States Ship Canal – finally started in January 1888. The canal would be 400 feet (120 m) in width and have a depth of 15 feet (4.6 m) to 18 feet (5.5 m). It would be cut directly through the rock of Dyckman's Meadow, making a straight course to the Hudson River. The first section of the canal, the cut at Marble Hill, was completed in 1895 and opened on June 17 of that year. Several festivities including parades were held to commemorate the occasion. At this time, Tibbets Brook was diverted into storm drains underneath Broadway, with the old right-of-way becoming Tibbett Avenue.

A bridge opened over the former Marble Hill alignment of the creek in 1900, carrying Broadway. The bridge's superstructure was demolished shortly afterward, with the construction of the IRT subway above Broadway in 1904. The effect of channeling through what had been 222nd and 223rd streets was to physically isolate Marble Hill on the Bronx side of the new creek. In 1914 the original creekbed was filled in with rock from the excavation of Grand Central Terminal's foundation during its construction; and the temporary island, comprising present-day Marble Hill, became physically attached to the Bronx, though it remained politically part of the borough of Manhattan, as it is today. The bridge carrying Broadway over the former alignment of the creek at 230th Street was destroyed in the late 1920s.

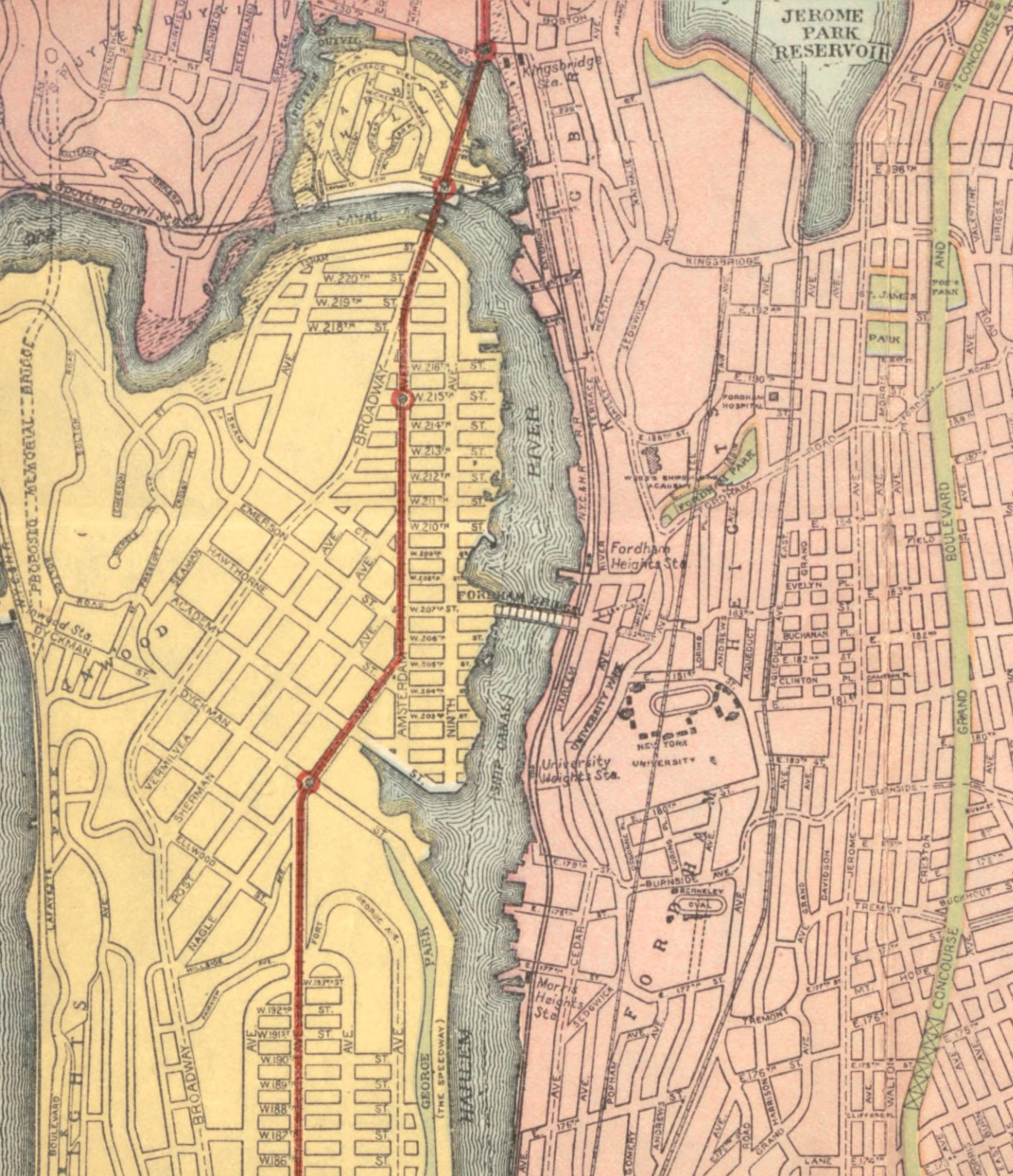
1908 map of the Spuyten Duyvil Creek separating Marble Hill, Manhattan from the Bronx mainland.

In 1919, New York State passed a bill in order to straighten the western end of the creek feeding into the Hudson. At the time, the creek was diverted south to avoid a peninsula that housed the Johnson Iron Works foundry. The foundry held out until 1923 when it vacated the premises, and in 1927 was awarded $3.28 million in compensation, just over a third of their original demand of $11.53 million. Plans to excavate the channel were finalized in 1935, and the channel was excavated from 1937 to 1938. The work severed the Johnson foundry's 13.5-acre (5.5 ha) peninsula of land from the Bronx, which was then absorbed into Manhattan's Inwood Hill Park; the peninsula now contains the park's Nature Center.

Today, Spuyten Duyvil Creek, the Harlem River Ship Canal, and the Harlem River form a continuous channel, referred to collectively as the Harlem River. Broadway Bridge, a combination road and rail lift span, continues to link Marble Hill with Manhattan. There is little evidence that the building of the Ship Canal enhanced commerce in the city.

== Bridges ==
Three bridges cross the Spuyten Duyvil Creek; from west to east, they are:

- The Spuyten Duyvil Bridge, a railroad swing bridge that carries Amtrak's Empire Corridor between Penn Station and Albany. The bridge opened in 1900 and carries one railroad track (though previously had two tracks).
- The Henry Hudson Bridge, a bi-level steel arch toll bridge carrying the Henry Hudson Parkway (NY 9A). The bridge was proposed in 1904, but due to opposition by local residents, was not completed and opened until 1936.
- Broadway Bridge, a vertical lift bridge carrying pedestrian and vehicular traffic using Broadway (US 9) on the lower level, and the New York City Subway's 1 train on the upper level. The first bridge opened in 1895 and was later relocated to 207th Street/Fordham Road on the Harlem River, becoming known as the University Heights Bridge; the current bridge, the third on the site, opened in 1962.

== See also ==
- List of rivers of New York
