= Henry Hudson Bridge =

Bridge in New York City

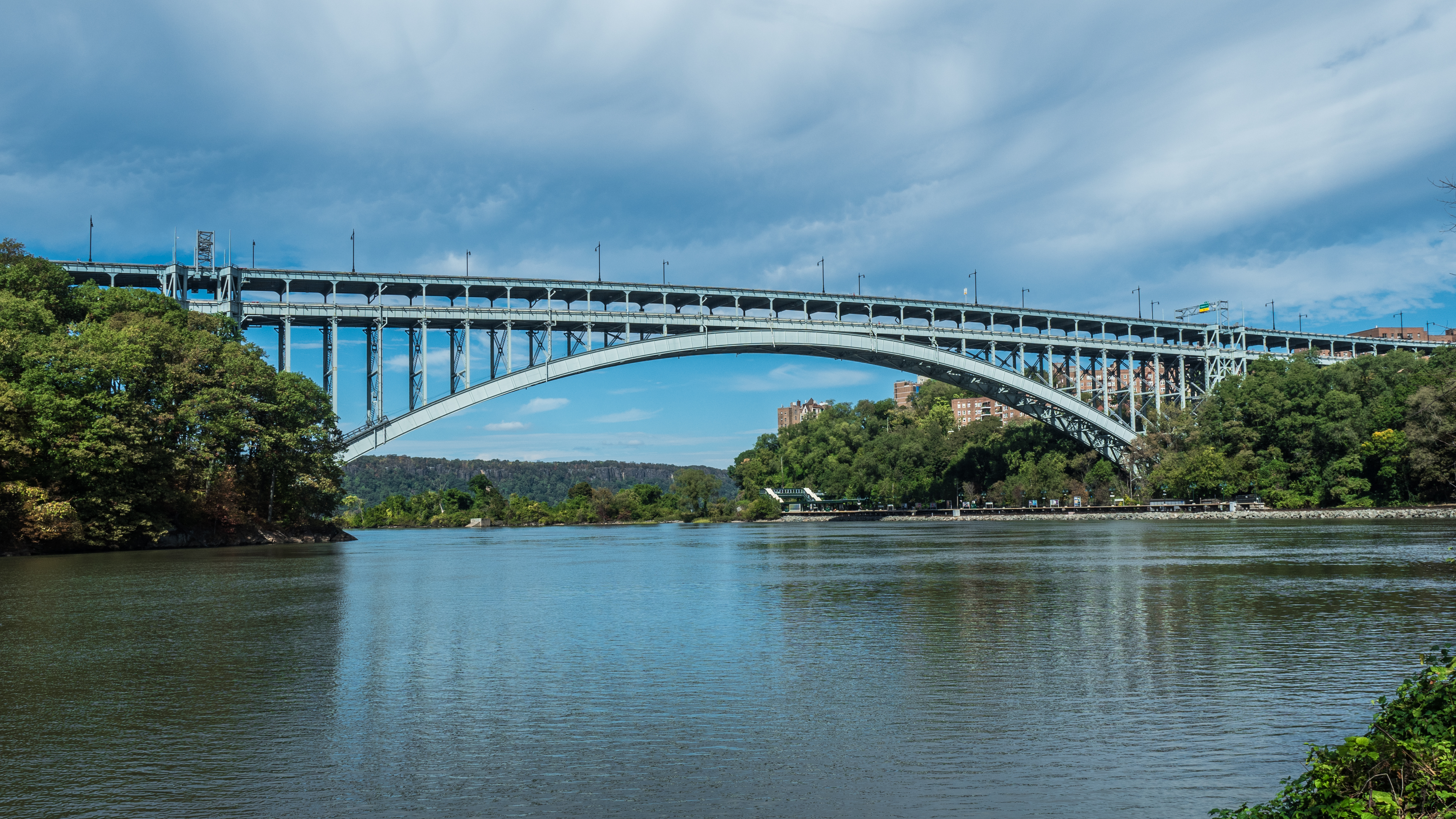
- View from Inwood Hill Park
- Coordinates: 40.877861°N 73.921777°W
- Carries: 6 lanes (3 upper, 3 lower) of NY 9A / Henry Hudson Parkway
- Crosses: Spuyten Duyvil Creek
- Locale: Spuyten Duyvil, Bronx and Inwood, Manhattan, New York City
- Official name: Henry Hudson Bridge
- Maintained by: MTA Bridges and Tunnels

Characteristics
- Design: Double-decked arch bridge
- Total length: 2,208 ft (673 m)
- Longest span: 841 ft (256 m)
- Clearance above: 12 ft (4 m)
- Clearance below: 143 ft (44 m)

History
- Designer: David B. Steinman
- Opened: December 12, 1936; 89 years ago

Statistics
- Daily traffic: 62,648 (2016)
- Toll: As of August 6, 2023, $8.25 (Tolls By Mail and non-New York E-ZPass); $3.18 (New York E-ZPass); $5.04 (Mid-Tier NYCSC E-Z Pass)

Location
- Interactive map of Henry Hudson Bridge

The Henry Hudson Bridge is a double-deck steel arch toll bridge in New York City across the Spuyten Duyvil Creek. It connects Spuyten Duyvil in the Bronx with Inwood in Manhattan to the south, via the Henry Hudson Parkway (NY 9A). On the Manhattan side, the parkway goes into Inwood Hill Park. Commercial vehicles are not permitted on this bridge or on the parkway in general.

The bridge is operated by MTA Bridges and Tunnels, an affiliate agency of the Metropolitan Transportation Authority.

== Design ==
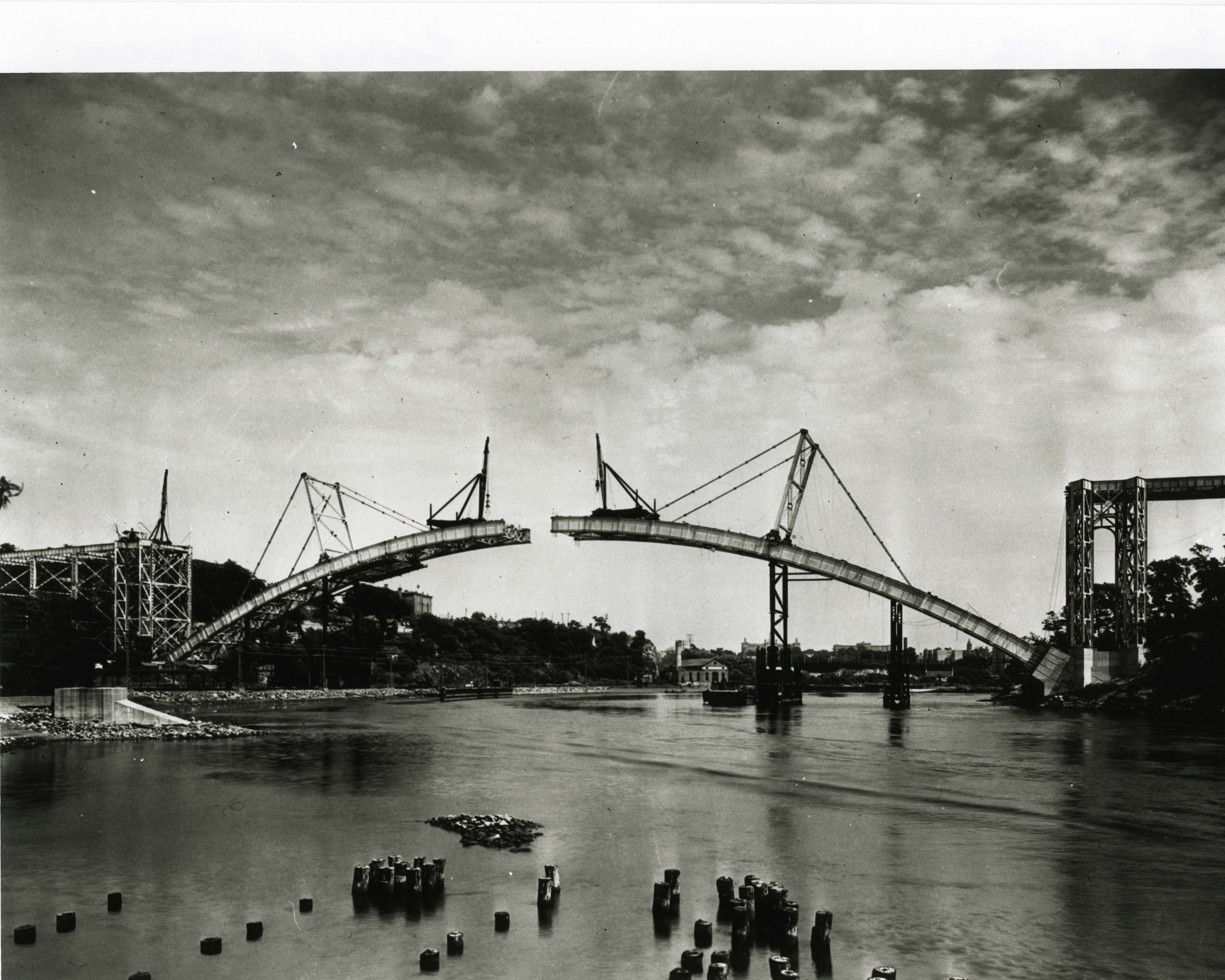
The bridge under construction in June 1936

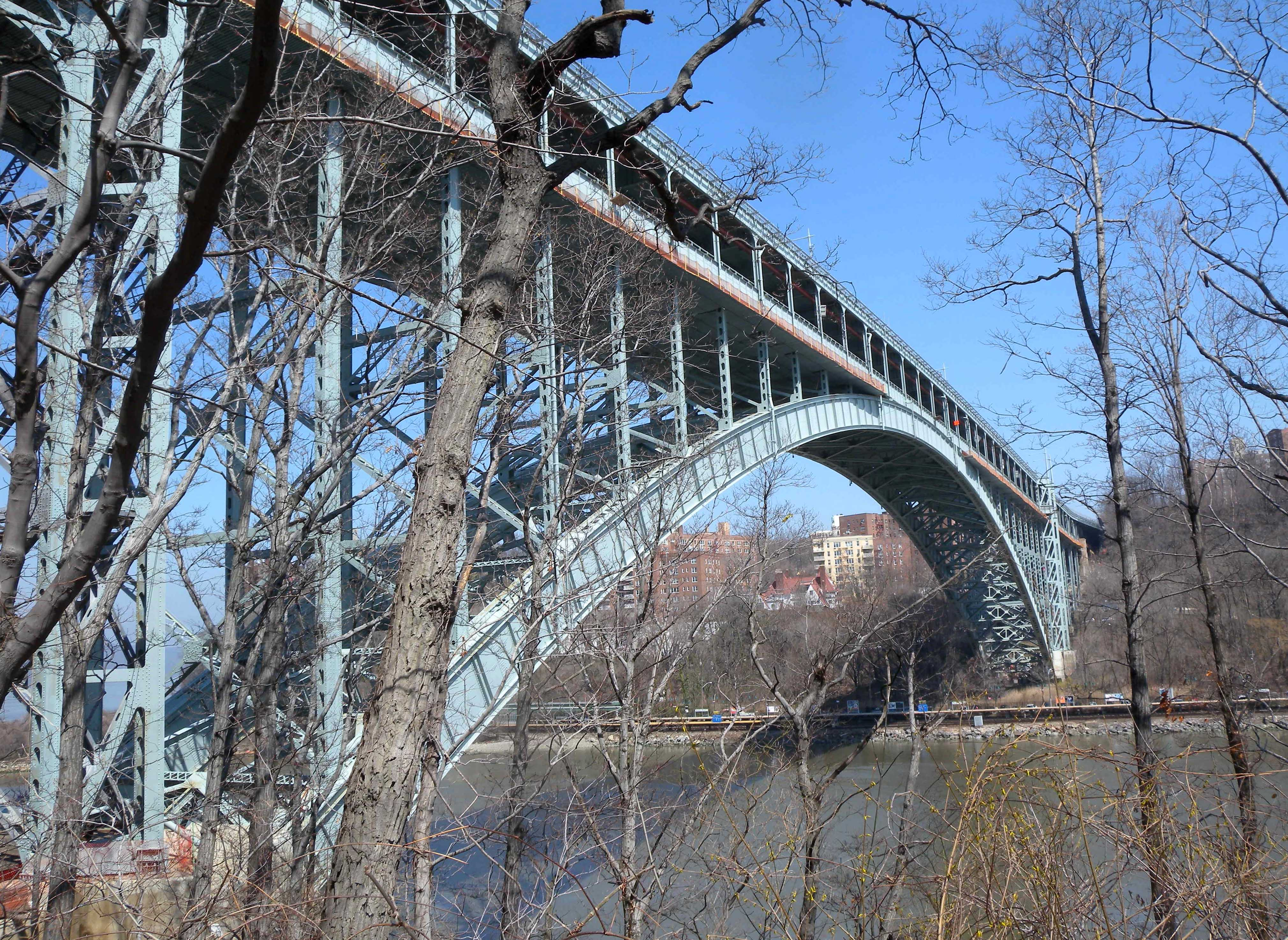
A close-up view of the bridge from the Manhattan side

The bridge was designed by David B. Steinman, drawing upon his 1911 Ph.D. thesis in civil engineering at Columbia University. Named to commemorate the voyage of Henry Hudson on the Half Moon, which anchored near the site in 1609, it was the longest plate girder arch and fixed arch bridge in the world when it opened in 1936.

The bridge has two roadway levels carrying a total of six traffic lanes and a pedestrian walkway and spans Spuyten Duyvil Creek just east of where the tidal strait meets the Hudson River. The bridge is part of the Henry Hudson Parkway, New York State Route 9A. To its west, at five feet above water level, is the Spuyten Duyvil Bridge, which is used by Amtrak trains to Albany, New York and other points north. The Spuyten Duyvil Metro-North station is under the Henry Hudson Bridge on the Bronx side.

== History ==
A bridge at this location was proposed as early as 1906, but Spuyten Duyvil residents and other civic groups opposed the bridge, arguing that it would destroy the virgin forest of Inwood Hill Park and bring traffic congestion to Bronx communities. Robert Moses preferred the route along the Hudson River because he received the land for the Henry Hudson Parkway for free and used federal labor to build the parkway.

The original single-deck structure was built for the Henry Hudson Parkway Authority by the American Bridge Company at a cost of $4.949 million and opened on December 12, 1936. The upper level of the bridge was designed to be added at a later date and opened on May 7, 1938. The second deck cost $2 million and was funded by toll revenue. The bridge's construction helped open the Riverdale neighborhood to development.

A rehabilitation project commenced in 2000 and was carried out by Steinman, Boynton, Gronquist and Birdsall, a successor of David B. Steinman's firm. Repairs took place nearly continuously for at least a decade, at a cost of $160 million. The bridge was renovated from late 2017 to late 2020. The $86 million project replaced the last remnants of the original upper and lower decks, reopened the pedestrian and cycling path, eliminated the lower level toll booths, upgraded roadway lighting, and made seismic improvements.

== Tolls ==
As of January 4, 2026, drivers pay $8.87 per car or $5.06 per motorcycle for tolls by mail/non-NYCSC E-Z Pass. E-ZPass users with transponders issued by the New York E‑ZPass Customer Service Center pay $3.42 per car or $2.33 per motorcycle. Mid-Tier NYCSC E-Z Pass users pay $5.42 per car or $3.72 per motorcycle. All E-ZPass users with transponders not issued by the New York E-ZPass CSC will be required to pay Toll-by-mail rates. Starting in February 2024, all drivers who have a Bronx address and a NYCSC E-ZPass have received a 100 percent rebate; Bronx residents are automatically enrolled in the program.

The original toll was 10 cents. In January 2010, the MTA announced that it planned to implement a pilot program on the Henry Hudson Bridge to phase out toll booths and use open road tolling. On January 20, 2011, this toll pilot project got underway. Drivers without E-ZPass are sent a bill in the mail. The new tolling system was implemented on November 10, 2012, and has since been implemented on all nine MTA crossings.

On November 20, 2016, the upper level tollbooths were dismantled. Cameras and E-ZPass readers are mounted on new overhead gantries manufactured by TransCore near where the booths were located. A vehicle without E-ZPass has a picture taken of its license plate and a bill for the toll is mailed to its owner. For E-ZPass users, sensors detect their transponders wirelessly. The lower level tollbooths remained, albeit decommissioned, until 2019.
