= Riverside Park (Manhattan) =

Public park in New York City

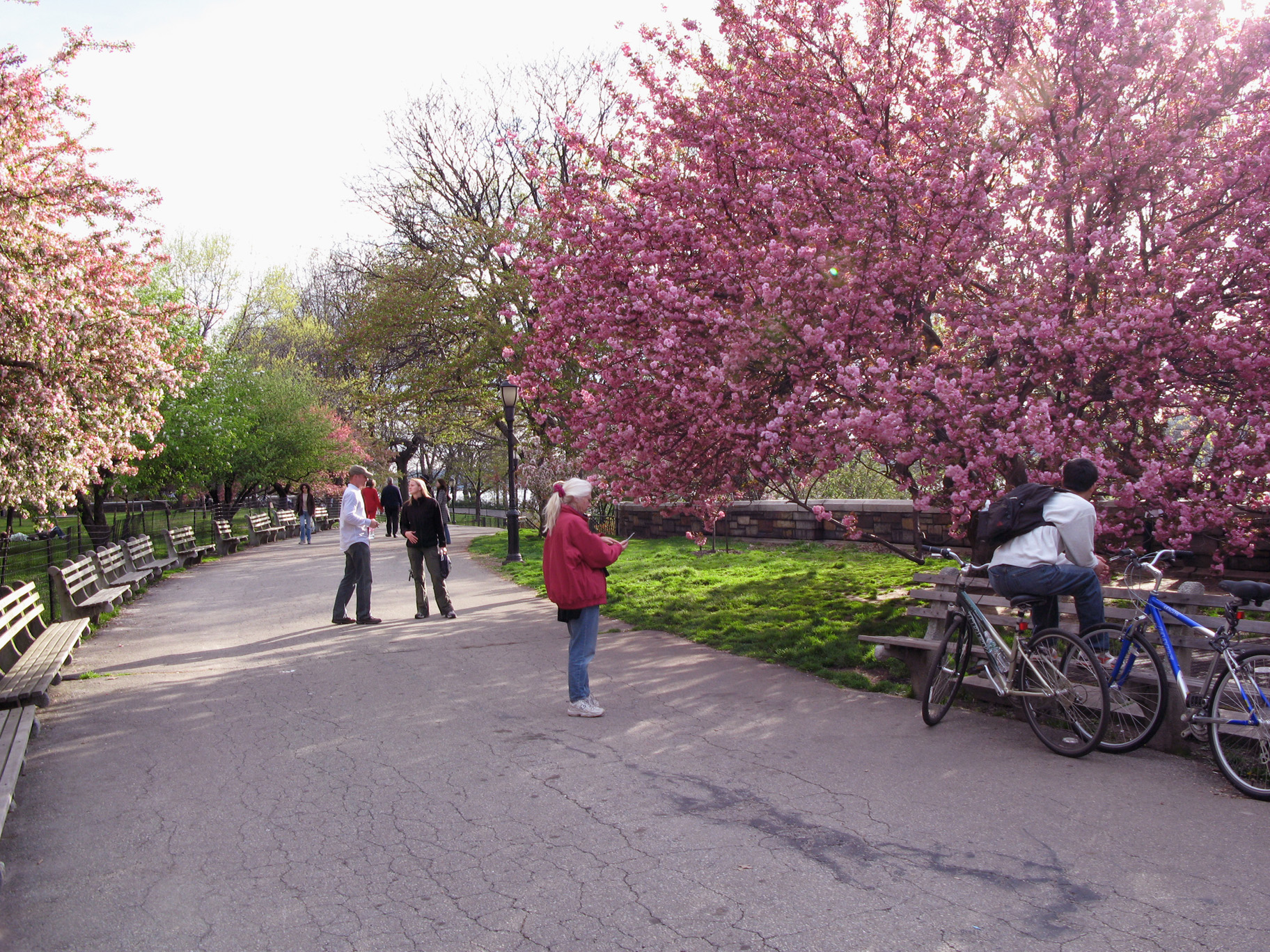
- Riverside Park has many walking and bicycle paths.
- Interactive map of Riverside Park
- Type: Urban park
- Location: Manhattan, New York
- Coordinates: 40°48′15″N 73°58′12″W
- Area: 253.17 acres (102.45 ha)
- Operator: NYC Parks
- Status: Open all year
- Public transit: Subway and bus; see below
- Riverside Park and Drive
- U.S. National Register of Historic Places
- New York State Register of Historic Places
- New York City Landmark
- Location: From 72nd St. to 129th St., New York City (Note: 12th Avenue, which runs directly below the Riverside Drive Viaduct and alongside Riverside Park within Manhattanville, intersects with 129th and 125th Streets in the same location due to the street grid of the area. As a result, either 125th or 129th Streets can be considered to be the northern border of the original Riverside Park.)
- Coordinates: 40°47′53″N 73°58′31″W
- Built: 1874
- Architect: Multiple (Note: Including Calvert Vaux, Samuel Parsons, and Julius Munckwitz in the 1870s, and Gilmore D. Clarke, Michael Rapuano, and Clinton Loyd in the 1930s)
- NRHP reference No.: 83001743
- NYCL No.: 2002

Significant dates
- Added to NRHP: September 2, 1983
- Designated NYSRHP: July 12, 1983
- Designated NYCL: February 9, 1980

Riverside Park is a scenic waterfront public park along the Hudson River on the West Side of the borough of Manhattan in New York City. The park measures 4 miles (6.4 km) long and 100 to 500 feet (30 to 152 m) wide, running between the Hudson River and Henry Hudson Parkway to the west and the serpentine Riverside Drive to the east, from 72nd to 158th Street.

Riverside Park was established by land condemnation in 1872 and was developed concurrently with Riverside Drive. Originally running between 72nd and 125th Streets, it was extended northward in the first decade of the 20th century. When the park was first laid out, the right-of-way of the New York Central Railroad's West Side Line blocked access to the river. In the 1930s, under parks commissioner Robert Moses's West Side improvement project, the railroad track was covered with an esplanade and several recreational facilities. Few modifications were made to the park until the 1980s, when it was renovated and extended southward as part of the Riverside South development.

Riverside Park is part of the Manhattan Waterfront Greenway, a pedestrian and bicycle route around Manhattan's waterfront. The New York City Department of Parks and Recreation operates and maintains the park, although its operating activities are supported by the Riverside Park Conservancy. It is listed on the National Register of Historic Places and designated a New York City scenic landmark.

== History ==
=== Planning ===
The 191 acres (77 ha) of land in the original park between 72nd and 125th Streets were once inhabited by the Lenape people, but by the 18th century, European settlers used it for farming. Over the years, several villas were also constructed along the river. The area's two largest settlements were the villages of Bloomingdale and Manhattanville. In 1846, the Hudson River Railroad (later the West Side Line and Hudson Line) was built along the waterfront, connecting New York City to Albany.

By the 1850s, New York City was growing quickly. The construction of Central Park nearby in the 1860s spurred construction on the Upper East Side of Manhattan. Similar development on the Upper West Side was slower: by 1865, only West 76th and 86th Streets had been completed and opened. By an act of the New York State Legislature passed that year, the Central Park commissioners had the responsibility of executing the Commissioners' Plan of 1811, the Manhattan street grid, within Upper Manhattan.

In 1865, Central Park commissioner William R. Martin put forth the first proposal for a riverside park along the Hudson River. An act providing for such was presented to the Legislature by commissioner Andrew Haswell Green in 1866 and approved the next year. In his argument for a riverside park, Green wrote that the only location on the Hudson River waterfront reserved for park space was the Battery at the southern tip of Manhattan island. The first segment of Riverside Park was acquired in 1872 by condemning lots for a cost of $7.25 million, or over $80,000 per acre ($200,000/ha) for each of the 119 acres (48 ha) in the original park. The park also included the construction of Riverside Avenue, a boulevard lined with trees and overlooking the future park and the waterfront. The avenue was initially laid out in 1868 and was 100 feet (30 m) wide for its entire length. The plans for Riverside Park and Avenue came to the attention of William M. Tweed, who bought several lots adjacent to the park in anticipation of its construction.

=== Construction ===
==== Late 19th century ====
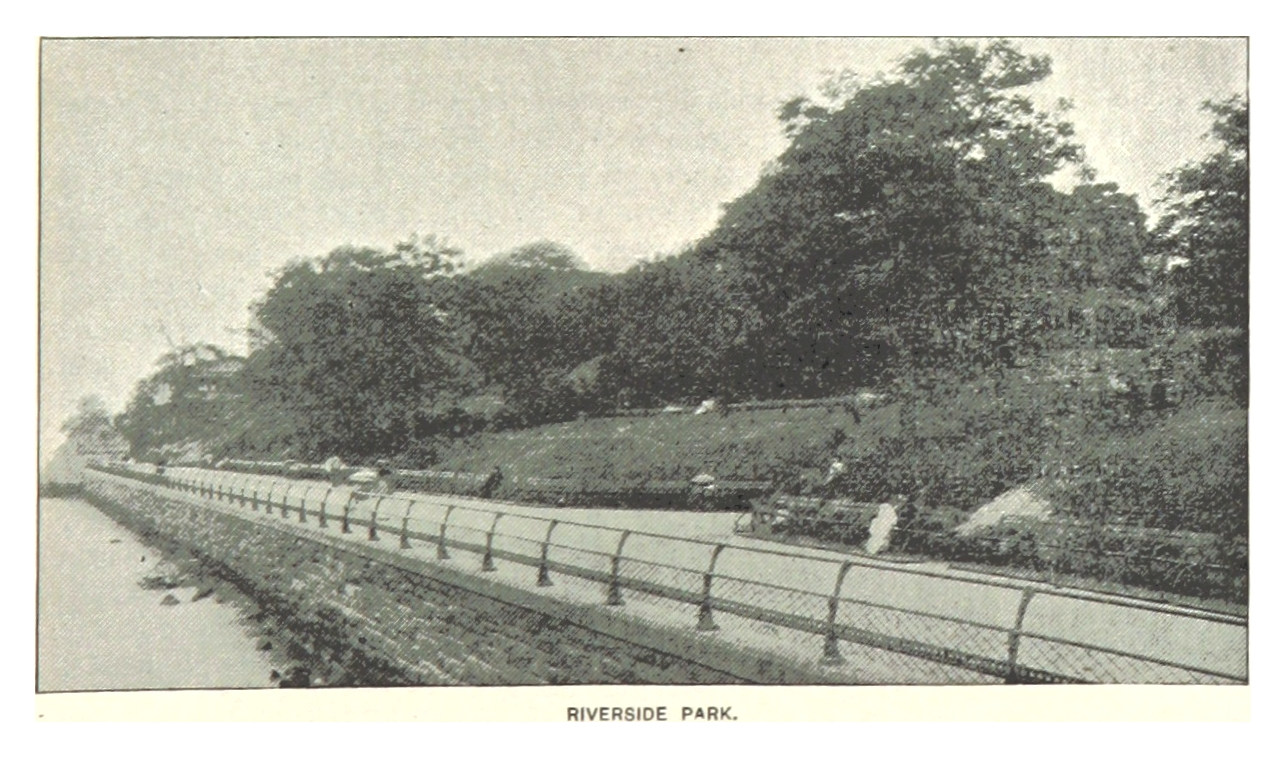
The future park site depicted in the King's Handbook of New York City, circa 1890

Initially, Riverside Avenue had been planned to run in a straight line, which would have required a retaining wall and extensive fill. However, the area's difficult topography had come to the attention of the Manhattan park commissioners. In 1873, the commissioners selected Frederick Law Olmsted, a park commissioner who had also designed Central Park, to redesign the park and avenue. Olmsted devised a plan that would create a main road extending from 72nd to 123rd Streets, with overpasses at 79th and 96th Streets, as well as "carriage roads" to serve the nearby neighborhood. The park and drive together would vary between 70 and 150 feet (21 and 46 m) wide. Olmsted's plan, which also included designs for Fort Washington Park and Morningside Park, called for these parklands to be designed around the existing landscape. Olmsted wrote in 1873 that Riverside Park "presented great advantages as a park because the river bank had been for a century occupied as the lawns and ornamental gardens in front of the country seats along its banks. Its foliage was fine, and its views magnificent."

Construction on Riverside Park and Avenue started in 1874 or 1876, and Olmsted was ousted as parks superintendent in 1877. Designers such as Calvert Vaux, Samuel Parsons, and Julius Munckwitz laid out the stretch of park and road between 72nd and 125th Streets in a way that made the park look like the Hudson Valley. Riverside Avenue opened in 1880 and quickly became popular, though parts of the road, such as the 96th Street overpass, remained incomplete through the 1900s. There was no single plan that encompassed the entirety of Riverside Park, which meant it would incorporate a number of separate designs. Olmsted wrote in 1886 that "in many important particulars the design has been mangled," saying that the park's terrain was too steep for recreation, and that Riverside Avenue's trees might block views of the river; despite this, Olmsted's offer to work with Vaux to create a unified park design was denied. Furthermore, the railroad cut the park off from the waterfront.

With the park's construction came land purchases on the Upper West Side. However, development in the neighborhood was slow to come since most of the lots were too expensive for the middle class to purchase, and the wealthy preferred to settle on the East Side of Manhattan. Development of low-density residences and small apartment buildings did not come until the 1880s. These residents formed an organization called the West End Avenue Association, which in 1888 published a booklet titled West End Avenue: Riverside Park in the City of New York extolling the park's benefits. At the time, few wealthy families had settled in the area. It would take until the 1900s and 1910s before Riverside Avenue and Park gained its present-day concentration of upscale houses.

The park was not extensively developed, either. A temporary tomb for the late U.S. president Ulysses S. Grant was built at Claremont Hill in 1885, since Grant had said he wanted to be buried in New York City. Additionally, paths between 72nd and 79th Streets were laid out in 1891. However, in an 1893 article, The New York Times mentioned that "but a small portion of the land thus acquired has been improved so as to be capable of public use." At the time, Riverside Park did not include the shorefront. In November 1893, a compromise was reached that would allow for the shore to be used for parkland while still allowing access to docks, and two months later, the park commissioners adopted plans to build docks at 79th and 96th Streets. Under an act of the state legislature, the city condemned an underwater area along the shore, which would allow for land reclamation to expand the park. By 1895, paths had been laid out between 96th and 120th Streets. The permanent Grant's Tomb opened at 122nd Street two years later. Notwithstanding the lack of park development, Riverside Park still contained nuisances such as outdoor sewerage, squatters' shacks, and coal emissions from the trains, as well as garbage dumps at 77th and 96th Streets. These conditions persisted through the 1920s.

==== Early 20th century ====
Riverside Drive Viaduct under construction

Pedestrians walking in Riverside Park north from 116th St, New York, in the early 20th century

Several structures were built in the late 1890s and early 1900s. Two monuments were built in Riverside Park at the turn of the 20th century: a permanent Grant's Tomb at 120th Street in 1897, and the Soldiers' and Sailors' Monument at 89th Street in 1902. This would be followed by eight other monuments from the 1900s through 1920s. The construction of these monuments signified a major change in the use of Riverside Park, since the park was no longer being idealized solely as a nature space, though writer Elizabeth Cromley says that the monuments did fit in with the park aesthetic. Another structure built in the park was Columbia University's Gould Boathouse, constructed at 115th Street in 1896. The Gould Boathouse was abandoned by the 1920s and burned down in 1927. Other waterfront projects undertaken in the first decade of the 20th century included a stadium for Columbia University, built along land fill. Another proposal, for a new boathouse for the Motor Boat Club, was vetoed by mayor George B. McClellan Jr. in 1906.

The existence of Manhattan Valley at approximately 125th Street blocked the further development of Riverside Park northward. However, in 1898, construction commenced on an ornate viaduct carrying Riverside Drive across the valley to 135th Street. The viaduct, designed by F. Stuart Williamson, was completed in 1901 and consisted of 26 steel-latticed arches rising 80 feet (24 m) above ground level. By 1902, plans were made to extend the park's border north to 155th Street. Williamson also designed the park extension, which contained stone retaining walls as well as grand entrances designed. The first extension of Riverside Park, from 125th/129th to 137th Streets, was completed in 1902. The city acquired land northward to 158th Street in 1903, and with the completion of this park extension in 1908, Riverside Avenue was renamed Riverside Drive.

In 1906, there was an effort to expand Riverside Park by adding the piece of land bounded by Riverside Drive, Claremont Avenue, and 116th and 122nd Streets. This was seen as historically important because it was the site of Battle of Harlem Heights. The city also envisioned 116th Street as a grand gateway to Grant's Tomb. Neither the park extension nor the 116th Street gateway were built, and today, the only remnants of this plan are the wide curves at the intersection of 116th Street and Riverside Drive, where the Colosseum and Paterno apartment buildings sit. The underwater area owned by the city was filled between 1911 and 1912 using rock from the excavation of the Catskill Aqueduct. The landfilling was criticized as it was done without public knowledge. One prominent group to form during this time was the Women's League for the Protection of Riverside Park, formed in 1916 to advocate recreational uses within the park. Many of the club's members were from prominent or wealthy families, and a sizable number of its early members lived close to Riverside Park. The Citizen's Union formed a Special Committee to, among other things, advocate relocating the railroad tracks over concern of spoiling Riverside Park, proposing tunnelling from 155th street to the Harlem River.

=== West Side Improvement ===
==== Initial plans ====
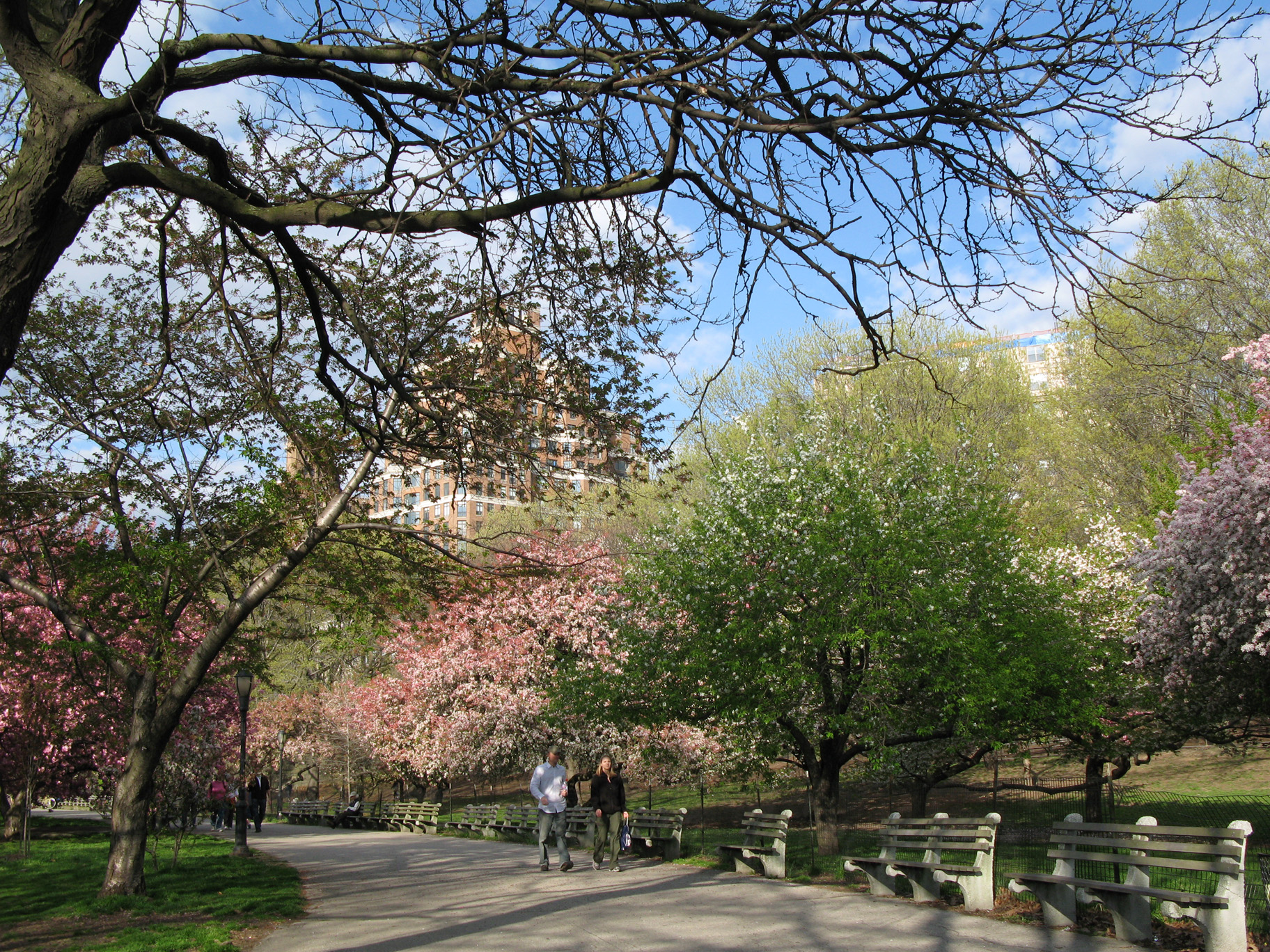
Trains travel through the Freedom Tunnel below this section of the park.

Even as there was discussion to expand Riverside Park, the New York Central Railroad continued to expand its facilities. This clashed with the ideals of the City Beautiful movement, which led an increasing segment of the population to view the railroad as a nuisance rather than a part of the park. Even so, the railroad was a crucial part to New York City's commerce, and as such could not be removed. As early as 1909, there were plans to expand the West Side Line to six tracks within Riverside Park, though this was heavily opposed. The crux of the disagreement was a stipulation that would give New York Central the rights to develop the shorefront with commercial enterprises. The area between 59th and 72nd Streets was being planned for development into train yards, which citizens' groups strongly opposed, and the city had no money to condemn that land.

Disputes over the railroad's role within the park continued for several years. At the time, there were other issues that beset the rail line; in particular, the street-level southern section of the line was known as Death Avenue due to the high level of collisions there. In 1913 New York Central presented a proposal for the railroad to be grade-separated, including constructing a new tunnel within Riverside Park. This plan was received favorably by the citizens' groups. By 1917, there was a tentative agreement to enact that proposal. Another initiative that aided the redevelopment of Riverside Park was the closure of one of the garbage dumps in 1923. Despite a citywide growth in realty values in the 1910s and 1920s, such benefits did not translate to the area nearest Riverside Park, and in the section between 69th and 89th Streets, real estate values declined slightly. As such, the local community wanted to improve Riverside Park.

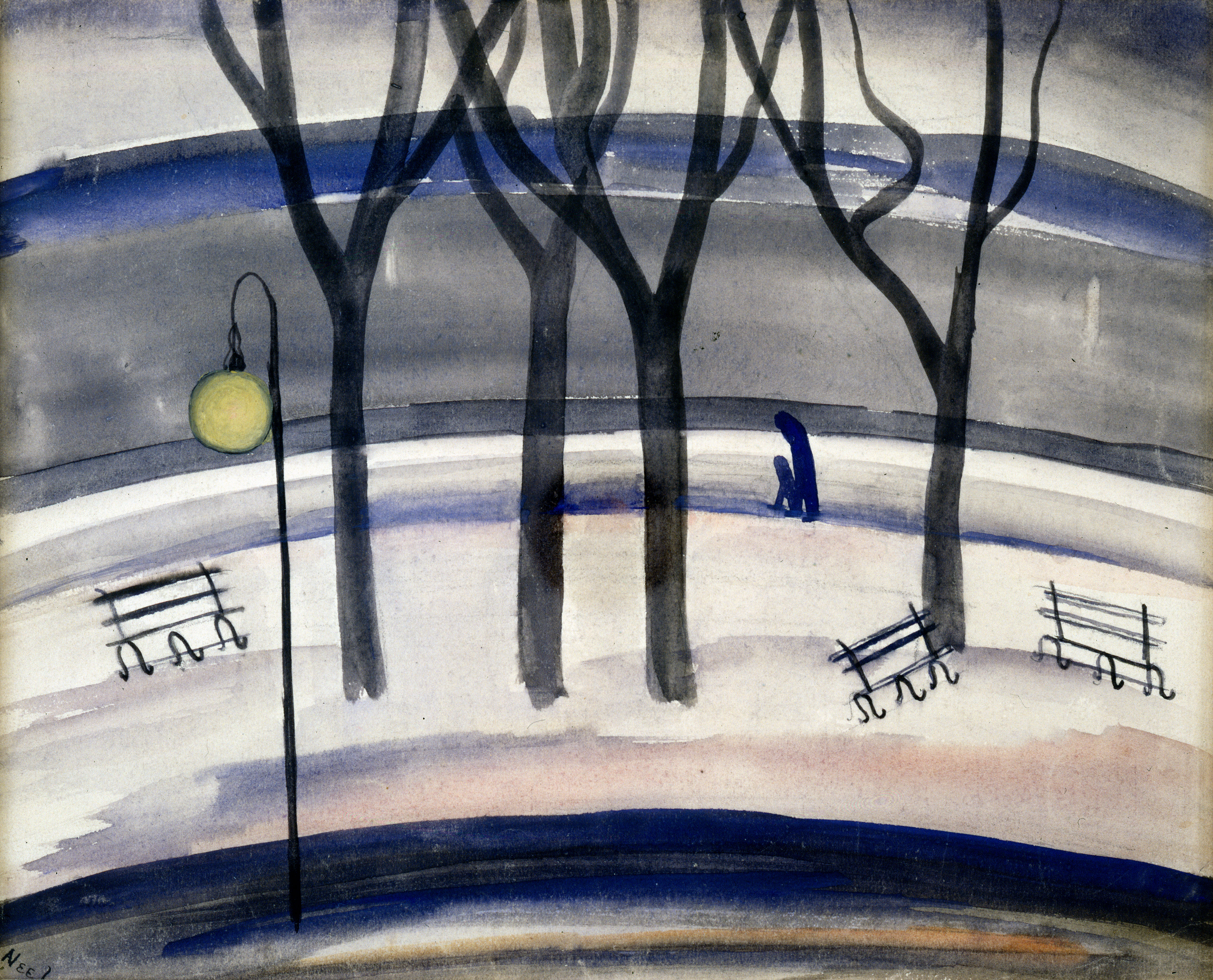
Evening at Riverside Park by Alice Neel (1927)

The railroad grade-separation proposal remained stalled until the passage of the Kaufman Act in 1924, which forced the electrification of all railroads in the city. The same year, comptroller Charles L. Craig put forth a plan to create a waterfront parkway in Riverside Drive to alleviate vehicular traffic. The "Craig Plan", the first of four unsuccessful blueprints for the park's reconstruction that were proposed in the 1920s, also called for the inclusion of athletic facilities, a feature that would eventually be included in the park's reconstruction. The proposal included plans for expanding Riverside Park, such as a freshwater swimming pool between 72nd and 75th Streets; a play field from 75th to 77th Streets; and a recreation building with a new boathouse between 77th and 81st Streets. The plans included land reclamation using excavation from the New York City Subway's Eighth Avenue subway line, which created up to 70 acres (28 ha) of new parkland. Planners thought that the railroad tunnel's utility could be increased as well. While some suggested building the parkway atop the tunnel, others proposed converting the top of the tunnel into parkland and building a waterfront parkway instead.

Disputes about the tunnel roof and parkway delayed the approval of a Riverside Park plan for several years, by which point increasing pollution made the park nearly unusable. The Women's League endorsed a proposal for converting Riverside Drive's bridle trail to a playground, though they opposed the scenic parkway in Riverside Park. Other organizations also opposed building the parkway in Riverside Park; for instance, the City Club endorsed building the parkway on the waterfront instead, in order to give more space to recreational uses. The waterfront parkway proposal was supported only by a minority of architects and organizations, and was voted down by the Board of Estimate. In June 1929, the city voted to approve a plan that would build the parkway above the tracks, but not on the waterfront.

==== Execution ====
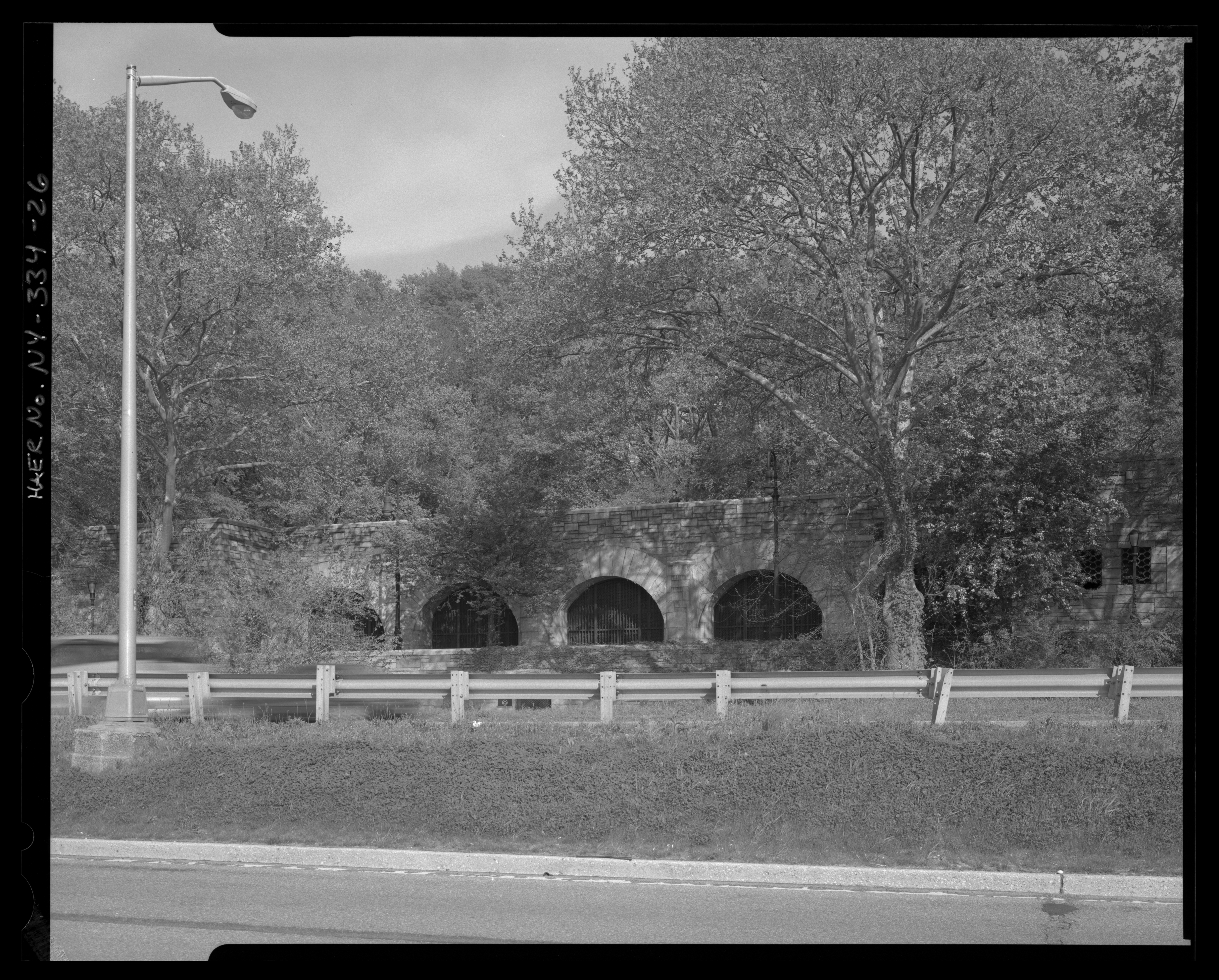
The railroad tunnel seen from 116th Street (2012)

The architecture firm McKim, Mead & White was hired to create plans for the parkway and the grade-separated railroad tunnel (later known as the Freedom Tunnel). In order to meet the requirements of the project, the firm proposed erecting a City Beautiful-style retaining wall with arches, similar to that of a Roman aqueduct, that seemed to support the highway above it. The retaining wall would include parapets and Neoclassical detailing, as well as 50-foot (15 m) arches to ventilate the railroad tracks behind the wall. The road would have contained classical flagpoles and lampposts, viewing areas, and resting areas for pedestrians. The plans also called for the reconstruction of the 86th Street marina and the construction of parking lots, playgrounds, and tennis courts.

Work between 72nd and 79th Streets was underway when parks commissioner Robert Moses was appointed in 1934. Moses halted McKim, Mead & White's plan, deriding it as a "visionary scheme," since he thought the highway's construction would make the new parkland inaccessible and contain too many pedestrian tunnels. Furthermore, Moses believed that his alternate plan would be completed more quickly and cheaply. Moses's biographer Robert Caro described Moses surveying the area prior to his project, and seeing:

a wasteland six miles (10 km) long, stretching from where he stood all the way north to 181st street ... The 'park' was nothing but a vast low-lying mass of dirt and mud.... Unpainted, rusting, jagged wire fences along the tracks barred the city from its waterfront ... The engines that pulled trains along the tracks burned coal or oil; from their smokestacks a dense black smog rose toward the apartment houses, coating windowsills with grit ... [a stench] seemed to hang over Riverside Drive endlessly after each passage of a train carrying south to the slaughterhouses in downtown Manhattan carload after carload of cattle and pigs.... [Once, Frances Perkins ] heard Moses exclaim, "Isn't this a temptation to you? Couldn't this waterfront be the most beautiful thing in the world?"

Moses's updated "West Side Improvement" plan, designed by Gilmore D. Clarke, Michael Rapuano, and Clinton Loyd, retained the railroad tunnel under the park, but moved the parkway to the shorefront instead; this would become the Henry Hudson Parkway. As part of the project, the parkway was to connect with the West Side Elevated Highway at the south end of Riverside Park, while the railroad would connect to the High Line viaduct even further south. The parkway was to be built on newly filled land along the shore, requiring the extension of the shoreline by 50 feet (15 m) and the dumping of 1 million cubic yards (760,000 m^{3}) of fill. This resulted in a more contiguous park area, since the roof of the tunnel would then be occupied by parkland. Moses's plan was also more actively focused toward recreation: his plan called for playgrounds, tennis courts, wading and swimming pools, an amphitheater, and docks at 79th and 96th Streets. The roof of the railroad tunnel would host several of these recreation fields, while other parts of the tunnel's roof would be used by a promenade. The cost as submitted to the New York City Board of Estimate was $11 million (equivalent to $255 million in 2025), of which $6 million would go toward the railroad tunnel alone (equivalent to $139 million in 2025).

By mid-1934, Moses was ready to employ about 4,000 workers through the Works Progress Administration. Filling operations were underway by early 1935, requiring the dumping of 4,000 cubic yards (3,100 m^{3}) of dirt per day. The parkway in Riverside Park was approved in June 1935, and was completed in 1937. In addition, plans for a new boat basin at 149th Street were announced in 1939. The West Side Improvement project was completed by 1941. The project was twice as big as the Hoover Dam's construction. In total, the project plan added 132 acres (53 ha) to the park. Ultimately eight full playgrounds were built, as well as baseball fields and tennis, handball, and basketball courts. Having achieved its goal of rebuilding Riverside Park, the Women's League disbanded in 1937.

=== Decline ===
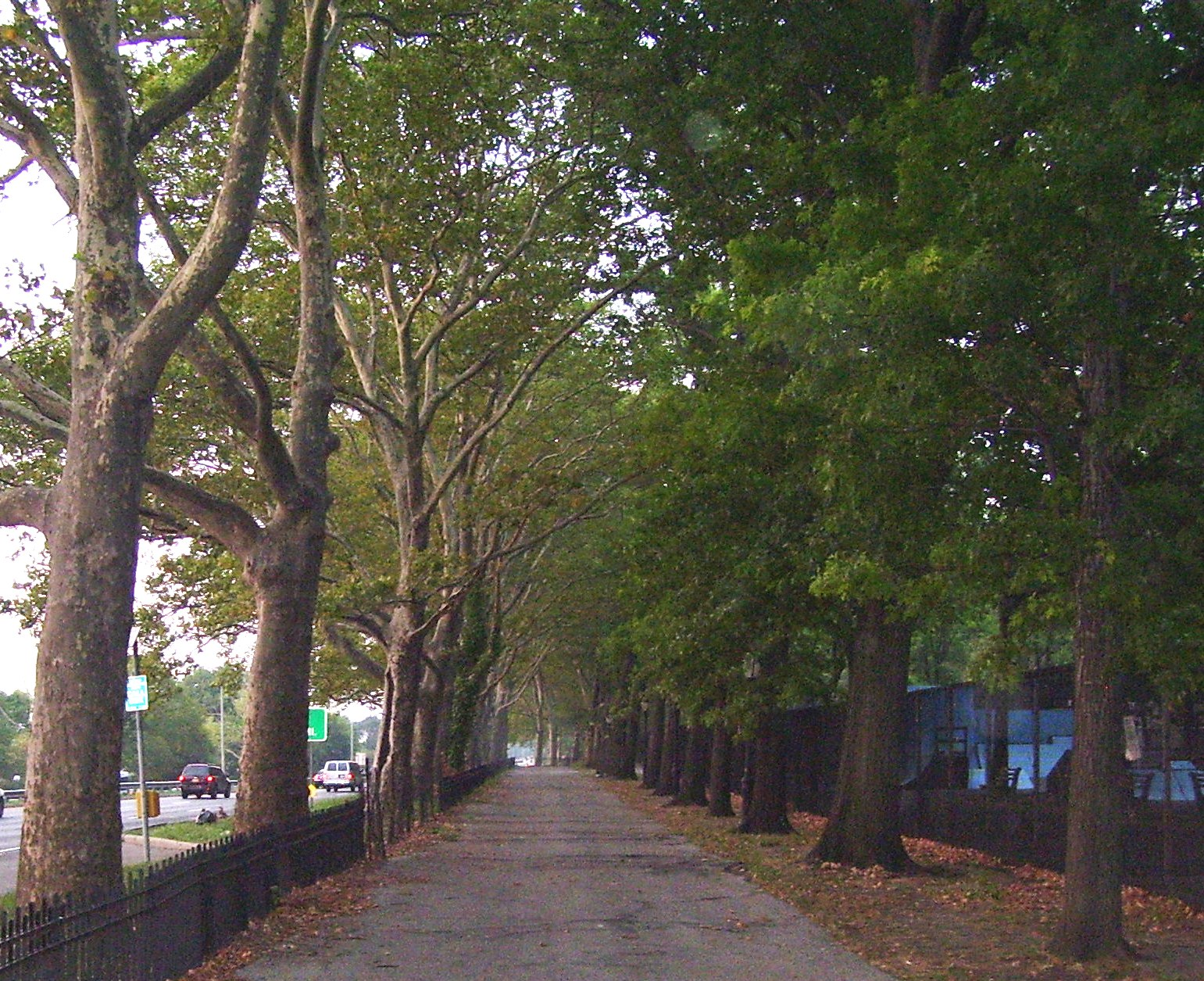
Walkway near 108th Street

For several decades after the completion of the Moses-era improvements, few changes were made to the park: a memorial grove was added in 1946; a playground at 76th Street was added in 1952; and the 103rd Street playground was restored in 1960. A monument to the Warsaw Ghetto Uprising, first proposed in 1947, was never realized due a lack of funding and opposition from city officials. Riverside Park had its own New York City Police Department precinct (the 26th Precinct), but this was abolished in 1954.

By 1962, a new playground was proposed between 102nd and 106th Streets, to be dedicated to the philanthropist Adele Rosenwald Levy. The architect Louis Kahn and the artist and landscape architect Isamu Noguchi prepared plans for a $1 million facility to include among other things, a community center, an amphitheater, and play structures. The plan proved to be controversial: advocates claimed the playground would create additional recreational space, while opponents argued that the playground would be excessively expensive and serve essentially as a memorial to a private figure. Despite having redesigned the playground five times, and having the support of Mayor Robert F. Wagner Jr., the designers met with much resistance. In 1963, opponents filed suit to prevent construction of the project, and in 1966, the project was cancelled by the new administration of Mayor John Lindsay.

Ultimately during the 1960s, a playground and a comfort station were added at 76th Street, another comfort station was added at 91st Street, and tennis courts were built between 97th and 119th Streets. Otherwise, the park was neglected, and vandalism and dumping were common. In 1970 a writer for The New York Times observed that the northern part of the park, in western Harlem, was in worse condition than the original park near the Upper West Side and Morningside Heights. Around this time, several shafts were installed in Riverside Park as part of a project to reduce sewage outflows into the Hudson River, which forced the temporary closure of part of the park.

In 1971, officials proposed converting the West Side Elevated Highway and Henry Hudson Parkway into Westway, a six-lane interstate highway connecting the George Washington Bridge and the Brooklyn–Battery Tunnel, which would have resulted in the condemnation of portions of Riverside Park. The construction of Westway within Riverside Park was ultimately deemed infeasible due to a state law that prohibited the Henry Hudson Parkway's conversion into an interstate highway. The Westway plan was abandoned altogether by 1984.

=== Late 20th century ===
==== Restoration ====
By 1979, NYC Parks was restoring retaining walls and making plans to rehabilitate several playgrounds. The failed Westway proposal had inspired a movement to make Riverside Park a designated city landmark, so as to preclude future construction that might take away parkland. Advocates petitioned the New York City Landmarks Preservation Commission to make the park an official city landmark. Riverside Park and Riverside Drive were collectively designated as a New York City scenic landmark in 1980 and listed on the National Register of Historic Places (NRHP) in 1983.

The Friends of Riverside Park organization was formed in March 1979, initially working to plant new trees and stop deterioration of existing trees. Their projects included the conservation of 500 endangered Dutch elm trees in Riverside Park. The organization soon turned toward preservation-oriented initiatives, successfully working to stop July 4 fireworks shows in the park and plans for a restaurant at the 79th Street Boat Basin. The city indicated in 1983 that it planned to refurbish parts of the park, especially the section between 97th and 110th Streets, at a cost of $910,000. The park's partial renovation was completed in 1984. However, Riverside Park was still in a dilapidated state because of funding shortfalls: it lacked any full-time security, park rangers, or recreation workers, and had a staff of 40 workers for the entire park. Throughout the late 20th century, homeless people and drug users would congregate in the park. By the 1990s, there were estimated to be between 75 and 325 homeless people living within Riverside Park, including the Freedom Tunnel.

In 1987, fourteen area cooperatives combined to create the Riverside Park Fund to raise money for maintenance. The Fund also sponsored a proposal for a continuous $3 million path that would run the length of the park to the George Washington Bridge, though this path would be delayed through the mid-1990s. Starting in 1992, NYC Parks restored the retaining wall within Riverside Park between 98th and 120th Streets. By 1994, the Riverside Park Fund was conducting various projects including landscaping, the installation of new playgrounds, and the restoration of existing facilities. A dog run was proposed for the Morningside Heights section of the park in 1998, but was canceled after opposition.

The North River Wastewater Treatment Plant was constructed between 137th and 144th Streets, alongside Riverside Park's northern section, during the late 1980s. The 28-acre (11 ha) Riverbank State Park was built atop the plant, opening in 1993. Ten Mile River Playground was renovated in 1995 for $450,000.

==== Riverside Park South ====
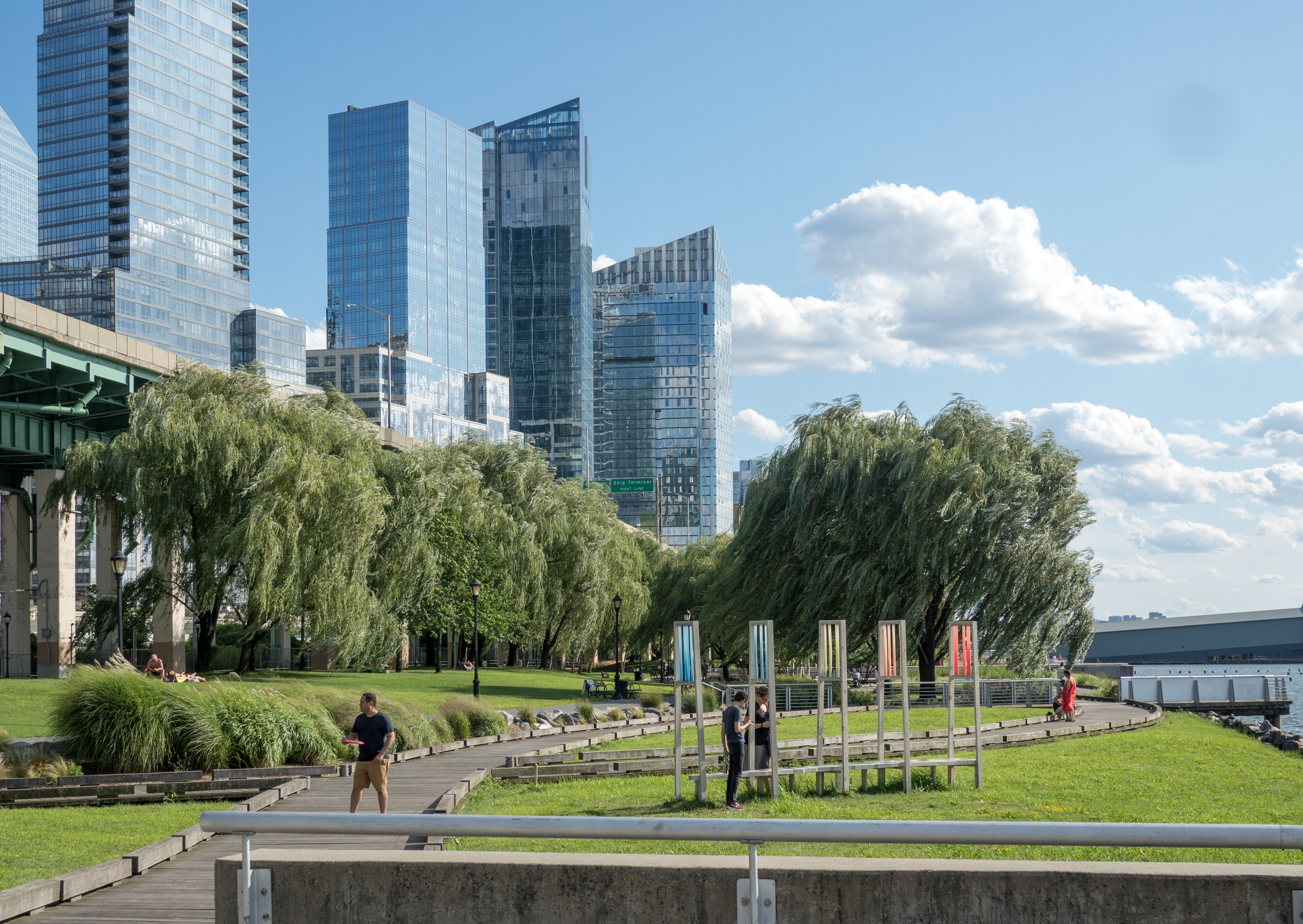
The Riverside South development funded this extension of Riverside Park. New Waterline Square buildings visible to the left.

In the 1980s Donald Trump, then the owner of the 57 acres (230,000 m^{2}) of land just south of Riverside Park that had been the Penn Central freight rail yard, proposed building a massive development including a huge shopping mall and the world's tallest skyscraper. Facing great opposition and hobbled by his weak financial position, Trump agreed in 1990 to adopt a new plan for the site put forward by six civic groups. The new plan, called Riverside South, included much smaller buildings centered around a new Riverside Park South, stretching between 72nd and 59th Streets with a similar design to the original Riverside Park. In order to expand Riverside Park by 25 acres (100,000 m^{2}), Trump's proposed shopping mall would be eliminated and the elevated West Side Highway would be relocated eastward to grade and buried. A new Riverside Boulevard would curve above the relocated highway, with the park sloping down toward the river. Portions of the former rail yard, such as the New York Central Railroad 69th Street Transfer Bridge, would be incorporated into the new park. As part of the project, Trump and the city agreed to build a new bicycle path connecting Riverside Park with Hudson River Park immediately to the south.

External images
- Trump City
- The Civic Alternative
- Riverside South, as proposed
- Riverside Park South with and without relocated highway.
- Riverside Park South Interim Plan.
- Riverside Park South Final Plan.

In November 1998, the first phase of the new Riverside Park South started, having been designed by Thomas Balsley & Associates. Phase 1, a 7-acre (3 ha) section from 72nd to 68th Streets, was opened just over two years later in January 2001. Pier I at 70th Street, part of the railyard, was rebuilt; it maintains its original length of 795 feet (242 m), but is narrower than originally, at 55 feet (17 m). Phase 2, opened in 2003, comprises a waterfront section from 70th Street to 65th Street, including two plazas at 66th and 68th Streets and a jagged waterfront. Phase 3, opened in August 2006, stretches from 65th Street to 62nd Street on the waterfront. Phase 4 opened in 2007 along the waterfront from 62nd to 57th Streets.

The design of Phases 5 and 6, located between the current and future highway alignments, is partially tied to the fate of the highway relocation, the timing of which is still uncertain. However, NYC Parks has approved interim and final designs for those two sections; construction of the interim park started in August 2016. Relocating the highway will require some reconstruction of the park.

=== 21st century ===
By the Fund's 20th anniversary, much of the park south of 125th Street had been restored, and Upper West Side and Morningside Heights residents had become invested in the park's well-being. The northern section, above 125th Street, still remained deteriorated, with poorly maintained ballfields and a lack of access from nearby neighborhoods. This was attributed to the economic conditions in the neighborhoods adjoining each section: while the Upper West Side was generally wealthy, Harlem was mostly lower-class.

In 2015, after a quarter-century of planning, construction started on a new pedestrian bridge connecting Hamilton Heights to Riverside Park at 151st Street, replacing a tunnel and a long staircase. After some delays, the bridge opened in 2017. Also in 2017, NYC Parks released a master plan for Riverside Park. The plan called for the restoration of the rotunda, Soldiers & Sailors Monument, Cherry Walk, and pedestrian walkways; expansion of the marina; construction of new bicycle paths and a new 111th Street entrance; and construction of new play areas in Morningside Heights and at the north waterfront. A bicycle bypass was proposed in 2016 to reduce frequent congestion and collisions between pedestrians and bicyclists in the park. The first section opened in 2019.

Riverside Park continued to suffer from various problems such as faulty drainage systems and deterioration. In 2019, The New York Times observed that following every rainstorm, water tended to pool on the roof of the Freedom Tunnel and other locations due to the three-tiered topography of the park, and that the tunnel's retaining wall was leaking. In addition, there was visible decay in some of the structures within Riverside Park, such as the 79th Street Rotunda, retaining walls, and various pathways. Other issues included the poor design of Riverside Drive's curbs and the dilapidated condition of the park's trees. The city government announced in December 2019 that it would spend $11.5 million to fix the park's drainage systems. Nonetheless, parts of the park remained in poor condition in the early 2020s, with inadequate lighting and bad pavement. A $7.4 million renovation of Ten Mile River Playground was announced in late 2023; during the project's planning, a set of dark monkey statues in the playground were removed. Cherry Walk was closed in September 2024 for further repairs lasting six months.

== Geography and design ==
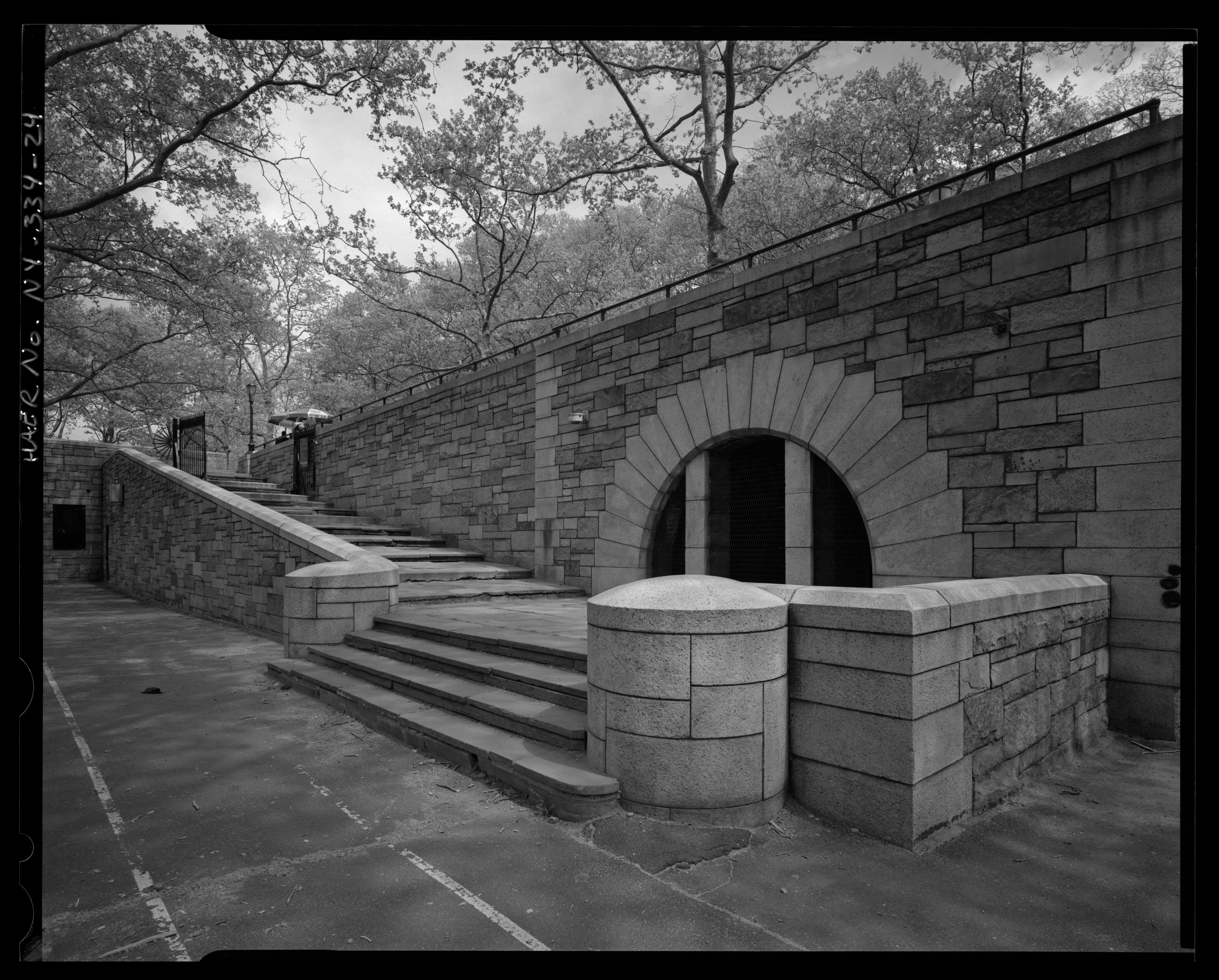
Staircase from the promenade above the Freedom Tunnel to the parkland beside the tunnel

Riverside Park is classified by the Parks Department as a community park covering 253.17 acres (102.45 ha). The primary section of Riverside Park is the tiered slopes between the Henry Hudson Parkway and Riverside Drive from 72nd Street to 125th Street, designated as both an official New York City landmark and a NRHP site. This section ranges from 100 to 500 feet (30 to 152 m) wide. The eastern border of the park is generally Riverside Drive, a curving avenue with a maximum grade of 1 in 27. Various apartment buildings and religious/educational institutions on Riverside Drive overlook the park. The Henry Hudson Parkway, on the park's western border, contains numerous interchanges that are included as part of the official landmark designation.

The 1930s rebuild was designed by architect Michael Rapuano, a Rome Prize Fellow, who placed London plane trees and Robinia trees atop the Freedom Tunnel. At 74th and 97th Streets, curving stone staircases led from the top of the tunnel to the playgrounds below. During the renovation, much of the original topography was modified in order to conceal the tunnel, and large clusters of trees were installed elsewhere in the park. Most of the initial plantings were removed by the 1980s.

There is also a northern section of the park from 135th Street to 155th Street and adjacent to Riverbank State Park. This area is designed more simply than the rest of the park, as the Henry Hudson Parkway is elevated in the area, and much of the space is occupied by parking lots. It is neither protected by the Landmarks Preservation Commission nor listed on the NRHP.

=== Geographical features ===
Sources vary on how many tiers are included in Riverside Park. James T. Dowell of the Riverside Park Fund states that there are three tiers: Riverside Drive on top, the promenade above the Freedom Tunnel below, and the parkland beside the Henry Hudson Parkway and waterfront esplanade at the bottom. The city's Landmarks Preservation Commission, as well as the National Park Service's NRHP report for the park, say that there are four "registers": three are similar to those cited by Dowell, while the fourth "register" is the sloping area that connects Riverside Drive and the roof of the Freedom Tunnel. Each of the "registers" serves a specific purpose. The uppermost, which includes Riverside Drive, serves as the border to the park. The central sections, comprising both the sloping region and the plateau above the Freedom Tunnel, contain most of the greenery as well as playgrounds and other recreational facilities. The lowermost register, next to Henry Hudson Parkway, provides a waterfront promenade with views of the Hudson River, as well as the Palisades on the opposite bank.

Before the park existed, poet Edgar Allan Poe was said to have enjoyed sitting on rocky "Mount Tom" at 83rd Street. The rock outcropping still exists and is the only such formation at Riverside Park with a name.

=== Paths ===
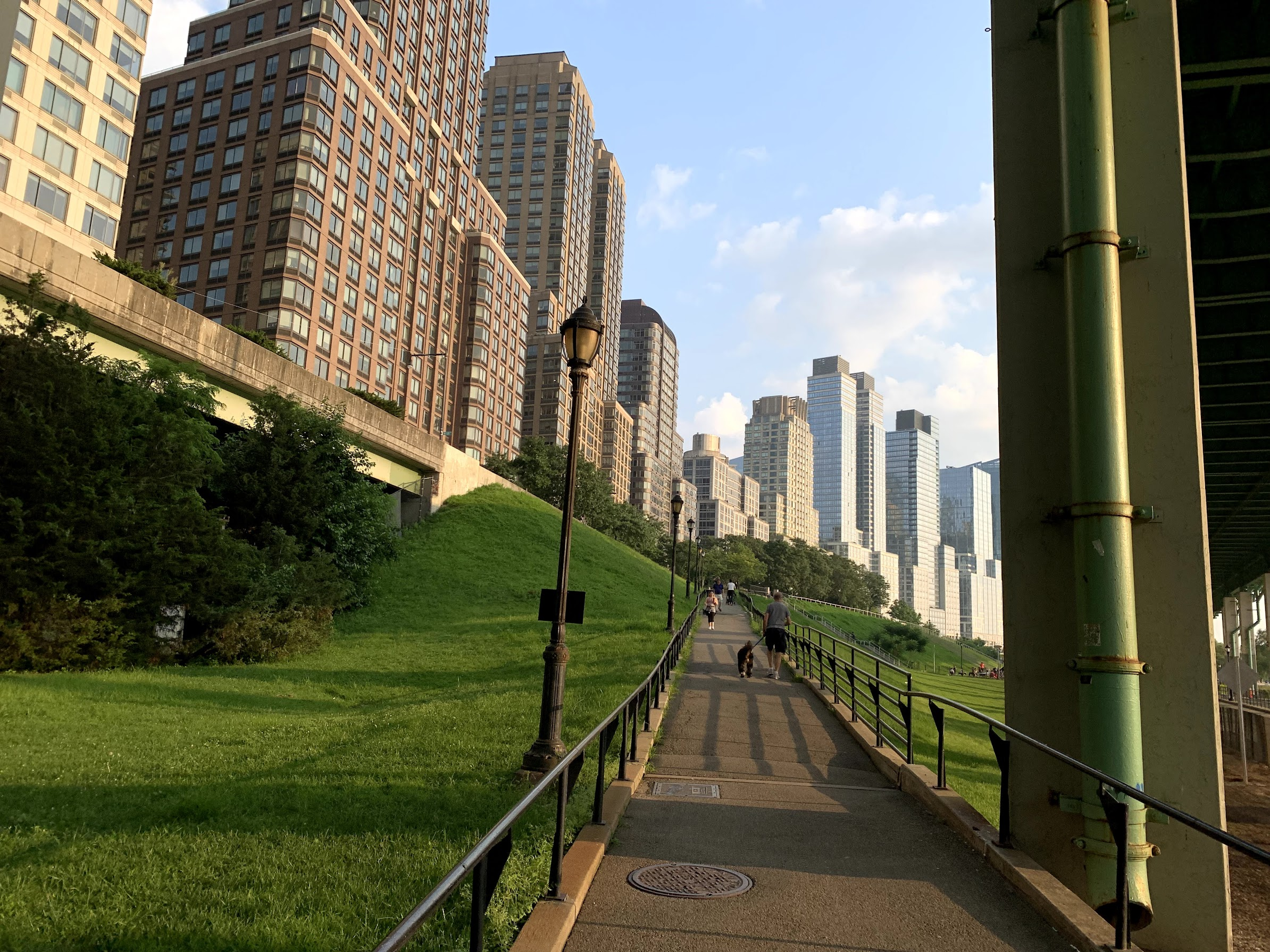
Ramp in Riverside Park looking up to West 68th Street

The park's central "registers" contain various curving pathways amid the greenery. These paths are connected to Riverside Drive and the waterfront level via staircases and ramps.

Riverside Walk, a waterfront walkway, runs the entire length of the park between 72nd and 158th Streets. This walkway includes Cherry Walk, a path between 100th and 125th Streets, which is named for the cherry trees beside it. The grouping of 700 cherry trees was donated in 1909 by the Committee of Japanese Residents.

Riverside Park contains a bicycle lane that runs for most of the park's length, except for a small gap in West Harlem. However, there are multiple locations where the bicycle lane intersects with the pedestrian paths, causing congestion. As such, a bicycle bypass is being built within several sections of Riverside Park.

=== Extensions and connections ===
Riverside Park South extends from 72nd to 59th Street on the former Penn Central yard, with an old locomotive on display. Riverside Park South leads to Hudson River Park which leads to Battery Park at the southern tip of Manhattan. With the addition of Riverside Park South and Hudson River Park, a continuous waterfront right-of-way for pedestrians and bicyclists now stretches nearly the length of Manhattan from north to south.

Paths along the river connect the park to Fort Washington Park to the north. The portion of Fort Washington Park from 181st Street to Dyckman Street includes Inspiration Point, a shelter at 190th Street.

=== Wildlife ===
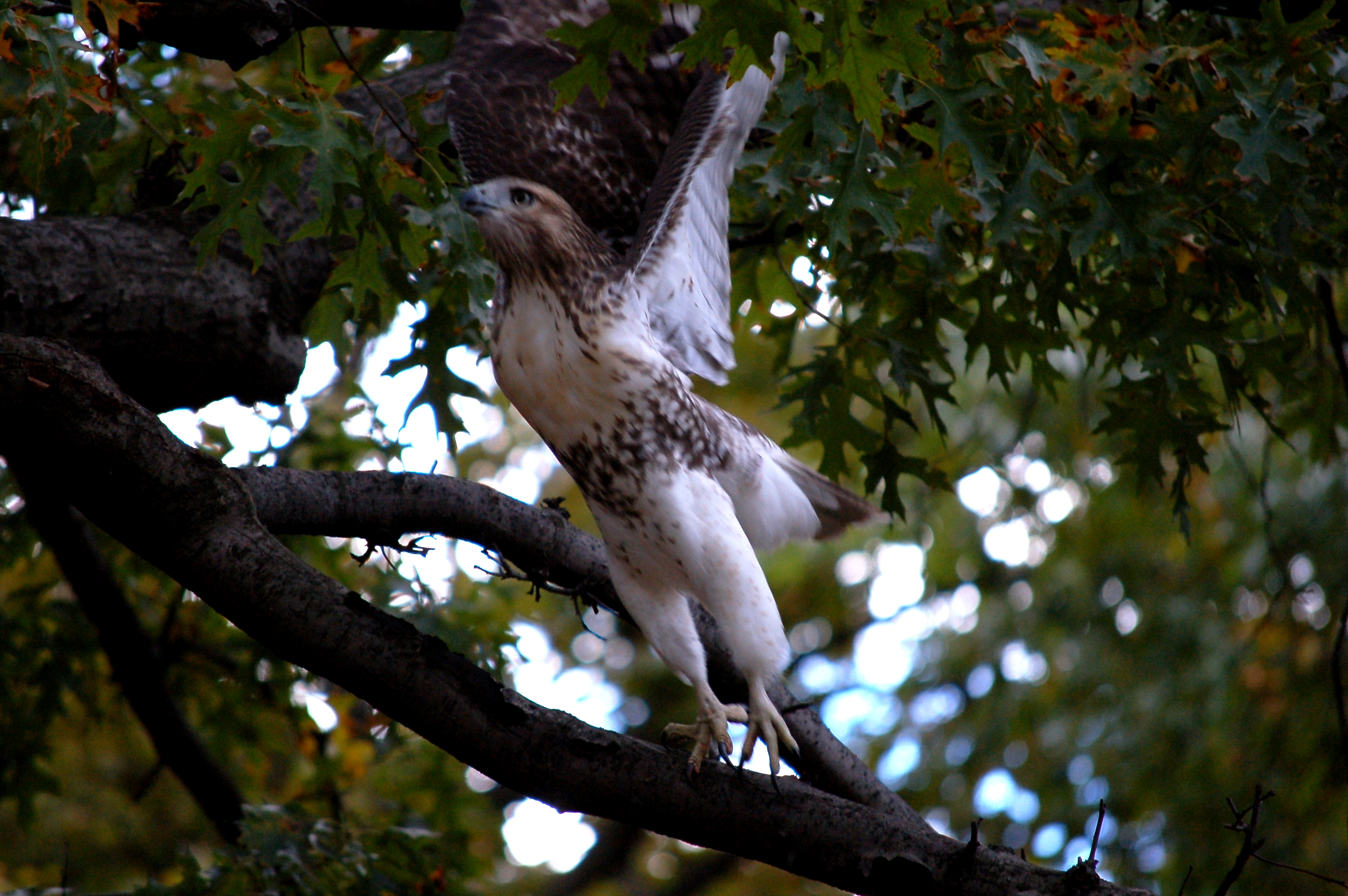
Red-tailed hawk in Riverside Park

A bird sanctuary exists in Riverside Park between 116th to 124th Streets. New York City Audubon estimates that birdwatchers have seen more than 177 bird species at the sanctuary since the 1980s. About 10 acres (4.0 ha) has been reforested and over 3,000 individual plants have been placed in the sanctuary since 1997. More than 80 bird species have been seen at the Bird Drip, a man-made water feature near 120th Street.

Riverside Park contains numerous other species of wildlife. The New York State Department of Environmental Conservation states that park visitors can see waterfowl such as Canada geese, mallards, and American black ducks; raptors, such as red-tailed hawks, American kestrels and peregrine falcons; songbirds; raccoons; and reptiles. In addition, a wild turkey named Giuliani was first spotted at Riverside Park in 2003, and several other wild turkeys have since been observed at the park.

== Landmarks and structures ==
=== Monuments and statues ===
Riverside Park includes numerous monuments and statues.

==== Amiable Child Monument ====
The Amiable Child Monument, at Riverside Drive north of 122nd Street, on the slope north of Grant's Tomb, commemorates the long-ago death of a beloved child, a small boy who died in what was then an area of country homes near New York City. One side of the monument reads: "Erected to the Memory of an Amiable Child, St. Claire Pollock, Died 15 July 1797 in the Fifth Year of His Age." The monument is composed of a granite urn on a granite pedestal inside a wrought iron fence. Originally erected by George Pollock, who was either the boy's father or his uncle, the monument has been replaced twice due to deterioration. It is thought to be the only private, single-person grave on city-owned land in New York City.

==== Eleanor Roosevelt Monument ====
Eleanor Roosevelt Monument

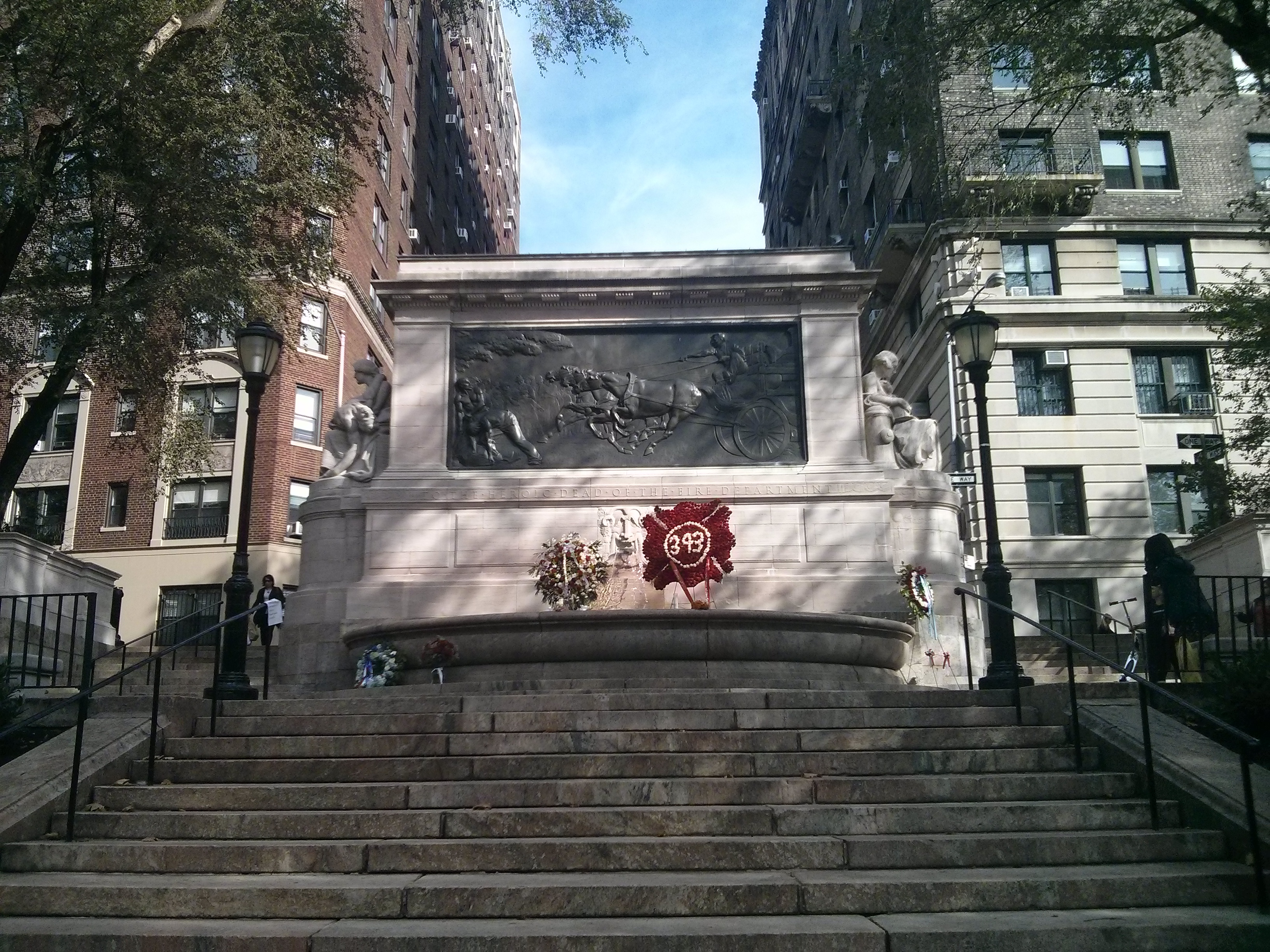
Firemen's Memorial

The Eleanor Roosevelt Monument is located at 72nd Street and was dedicated in 1996. The landscape architects Bruce Kelly and David Varnell designed the planted, circular monument. The artist Penelope Jencks sculpted the larger-than-life statue of Eleanor Roosevelt, the boulder on which it leans, and the foot-stone on which it rests. The architect Michael Dwyer designed inscriptions in the surrounding granite pavement, including a quotation from Roosevelt's 1958 speech at the United Nations advocating universal human rights, and a bronze tablet, located in the planting bed, summarizing her achievements.

==== Firemen's Memorial ====
The Firemen's Memorial, located on the west side of Riverside Drive opposite West 100th Street, was dedicated in 1913. The architect Harold Van Buren Magonigle designed the monument as a sarcophagus in Tennessee marble, with a dedicatory inscription on the east side. The artist Attilio Piccirilli embellished it with allegorical figures on the north and south sides, and a bas-relief bronze plaque on the west side. Approached from the west by a grand staircase, the monument sits on a terrace surrounded by a classical balustrade. A tablet, dedicated to the horses who assisted the firemen with their duties, was embedded in the monument's terrace paving in 1927.

==== General Franz Sigel statue ====
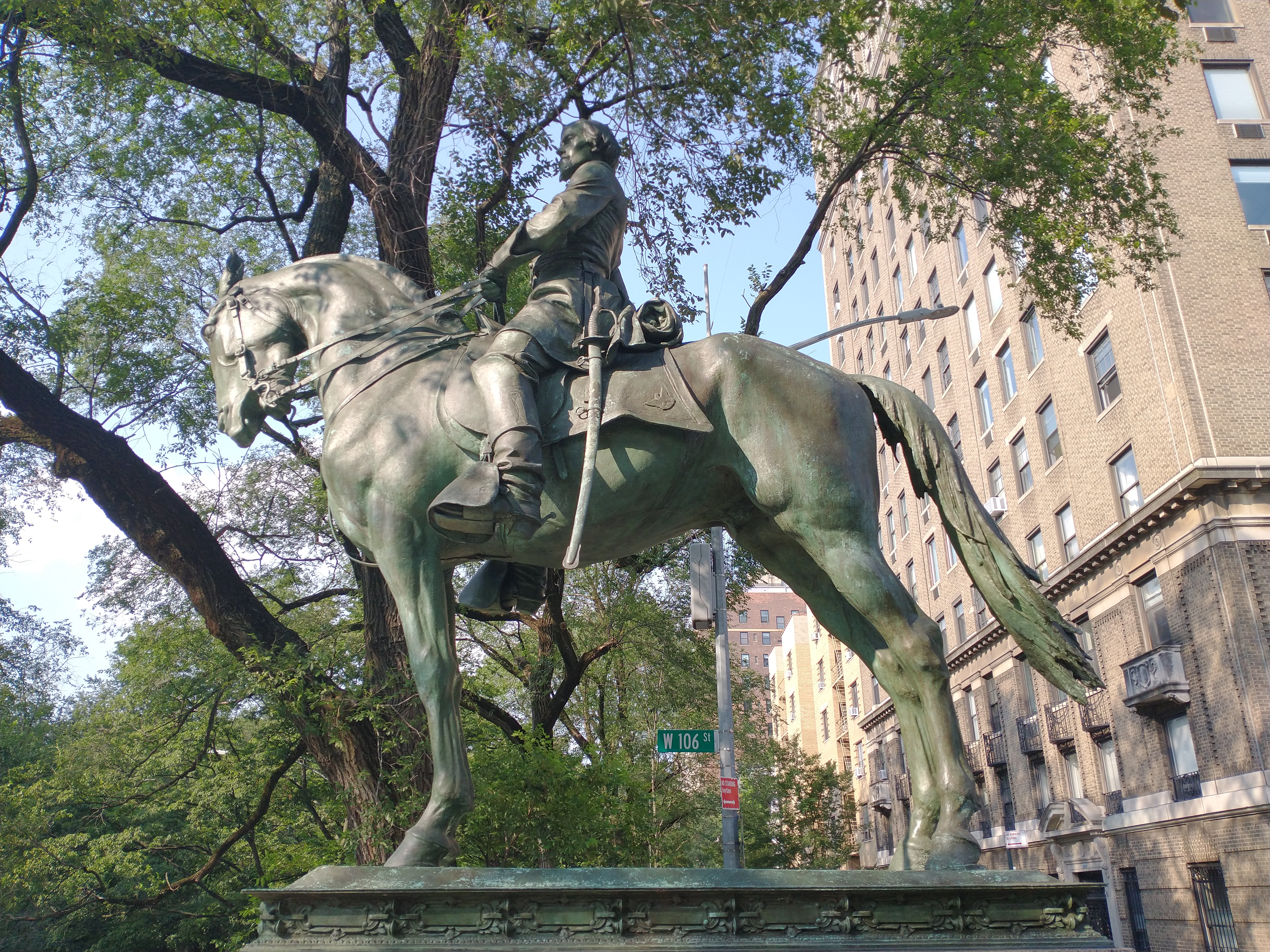
General Franz Sigel memorial

The General Franz Sigel memorial, at 106th Street, was designed by the architect William W. Bosworth and dedicated in October 1907. Karl Bitter sculpted the centerpiece, an equestrian statue of Sigel, who attained the rank of general in the Union Army during the Civil War. The larger-than-life bronze figure is located atop a stone pedestal at the top of a staircase. The figure formerly had a sword, but it was removed in 1941. NYC Parks restored the statue in the late 1980s.

==== Grant's Tomb ====
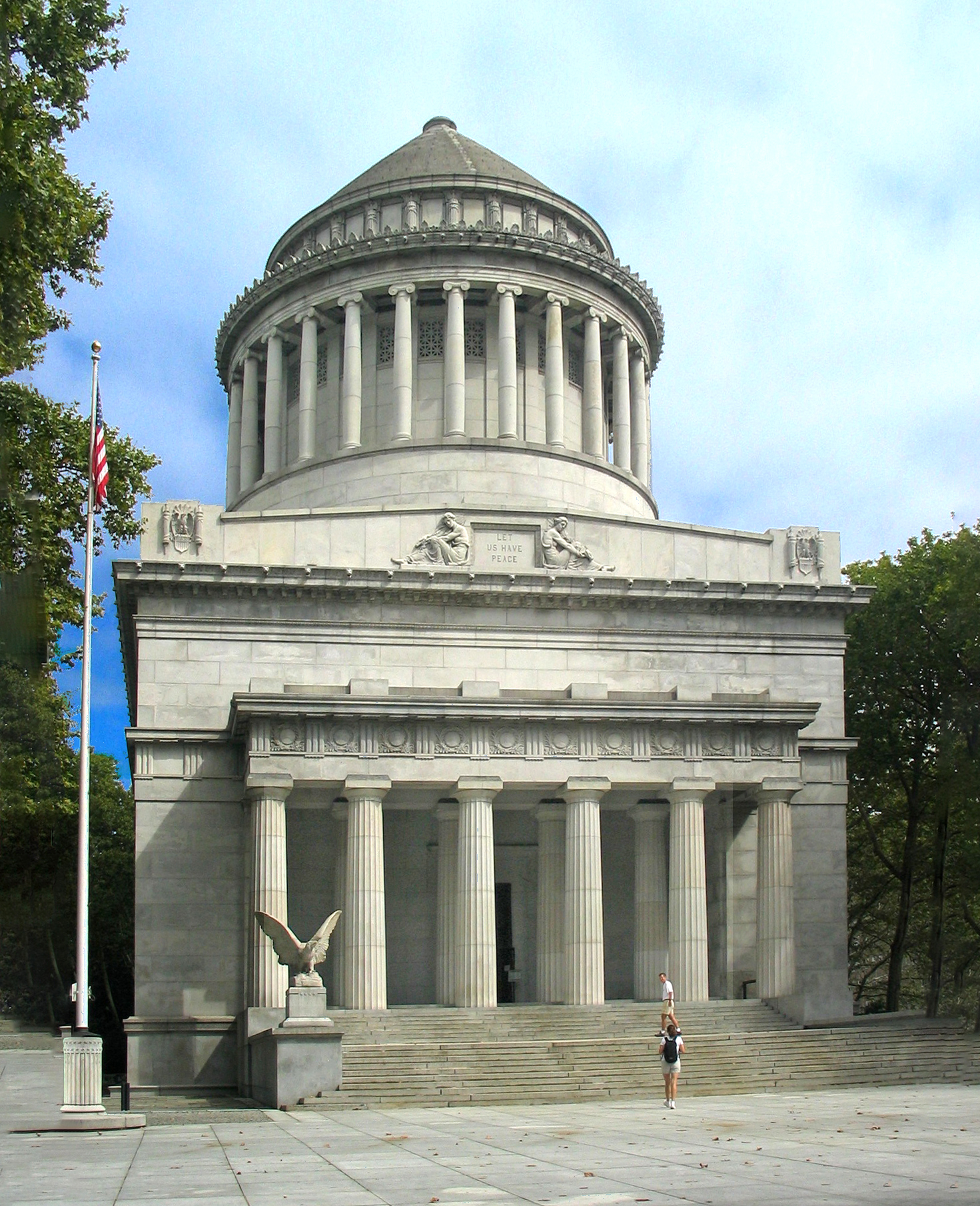
Grant's Tomb, dedicated 1897

The design of Grant's Tomb, located in the median of Riverside Drive at 122nd Street, is loosely based on the design of the ancient Mausoleum of Halicarnassus. The memorial was dedicated in 1897. The architect John Hemenway Duncan designed the building as a cube with blind colonnades on the east, west, and north sides, and a portico of Doric columns leading to the entrance door on the south side. Atop the cube, he placed a cylindrical dome embellished with Ionic columns, topped with a conical cap. Inside, the principal room is a crypt with sarcophagi containing the remains of President Ulysses S. Grant and his wife Julia Dent Grant. The National Park Service has maintained the tomb since 1958 as the General Grant National Memorial. Grant's Tomb is both a New York City landmark and a national monument.

==== Joan of Arc memorial ====
The Joan of Arc memorial, located at 93rd Street, was designed by the architect John V. Van Pelt and dedicated in 1915. The artist Anna Hyatt Huntington sculpted the statue, which depicts Joan of Arc on horseback in bronze. The statue was restored in 1939 and 1987.

==== Louis Kossuth monument ====
The monument in honor of Hungarian leader Lajos (Louis) Kossuth is located at West 113th Street. It was dedicated in 1928. The artist János Horvay sculpted a bronze statue of Kossuth standing atop a stone pedestal, and two more bronze figures at its base. The pedestal is embellished with an inscription and a denticulated cornice.

==== Soldiers' and Sailors' Monument ====
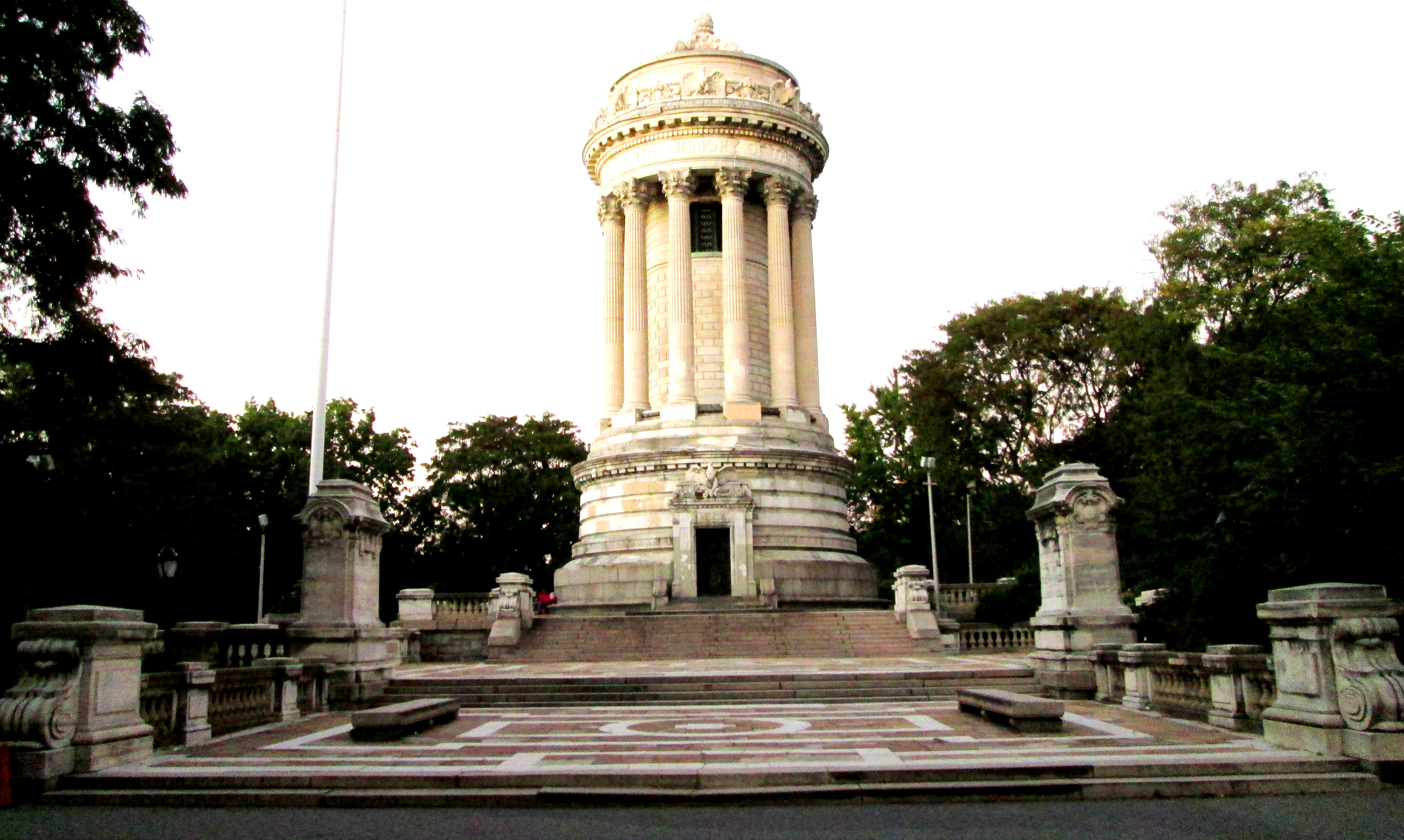
Soldiers' and Sailors' Monument, dedicated 1902

The Soldiers' and Sailors' Monument, dedicated in 1902, commemorates Civil War veterans of both the Union Army and Navy. Originally planned for Grand Army Plaza in Brooklyn, the monument was erected in Riverside Park opposite West 89th Street. The architects Stoughton & Stoughton in collaboration with the architect Paul E. M. DuBoys designed the monument as a circular temple embellished with twelve fluted Corinthian columns atop a rusticated basement, a reinterpretation of the Choragic Monument of Lysicrates in Athens. The architects sited the monument on a series of stepped terraces surrounded by a low classical balustrade. The Soldiers' and Sailors' Monument is a designated New York City landmark.

==== Warsaw Ghetto Plaza ====
Riverside Park almost received a monument to the Warsaw Ghetto Uprising, which would have been located between 83rd and 84th Streets. A granite plaque, set in the paving at the end of the Promenade, near 84th Street, on October 19, 1947, is inscribed: "This is the site for the American memorial to the heroes of the Warsaw Ghetto Battle April–May 1943 and to the six million Jews of Europe martyred in the cause of human liberty." Subsequent proposals for larger monuments were made by Jo Davidson, Percival Goodman, Ivan Meštrović, and a partnership between Erich Mendelsohn and Nathan Rapoport; however, none were approved due to a lack of funding and officials' fears that a large monument might distract drivers on the Henry Hudson Parkway. A monument measuring 102 by 60 feet (31 by 18 m) with a height of 80 feet (24 m), to be sculpted by Meštrović, was approved in 1952 but was never built. NYC Parks restored the site in 2001. It is now called the Warsaw Ghetto Memorial Plaza.

==== Other monuments ====
There are several other monuments in Riverside Park. These include:

- 1956 Hungarian Revolution memorial: designed by Tamás Nagy and dedicated in 2017.
- Hippopotamus Fountain, at 91st Street: designed by the landscape architect Mark K. Morrison, sculpted by the artist Bob Cassilly, and dedicated in 1993.
- General Horace Porter memorial, at 122nd Street (at Grant's Tomb): a flagpole on a pedestal, dedicated in 1939.
- John Merven Carrere memorial, at 99th Street: a pink granite terrace designed by the architect Thomas Hastings and dedicated to the architect John Merven Carrère in 1919.
- Major General Frederick D. Grant, at 122nd Street (at Grant's Tomb): a flagpole on a pedestal dedicated in 1939.
- Robert Ray Hamilton Fountain, at 76th Street: designed by the architects Warren and Wetmore and dedicated in 1906.
- Woman's Health Protective Association memorial, at 116th Street: sculpted by Bruno Louis Zimm and composed of a stele, an exedra, and a drinking fountain, it was dedicated in 1910.

==== Plaques ====
There are several plaques in Riverside Park that commemorate various events or structures. These include:

- Armed Forces Plaque, at 121st Street, dedicated 1953
- Battle of Harlem Heights Marker, at 121st Street, dedicated 1961
- Chaplains Memorial. at 121st Street, dedicated 1950
- Chinese Tablet, at about 124th Street (north of Grant's Tomb), dedicated 1897
- Claremont Inn Tablet, at 123rd Street, dedicated 1952
- Cyrus Clark relief, at 83rd Street, dedicated 1911
- Henry Neufeld Playground Plaque, at 76th Street, dedicated 1991
- Marine Heroes Tablet, at 93rd Street, dedicated 1950

=== Other structures ===
Riverside Park contains several other physical structures, including a three-story rotunda with a boat basin, a field house, and a building used by Riverside Park Conservancy volunteer operations.

==== 79th Street Boat Basin, Rotunda, and cafe ====
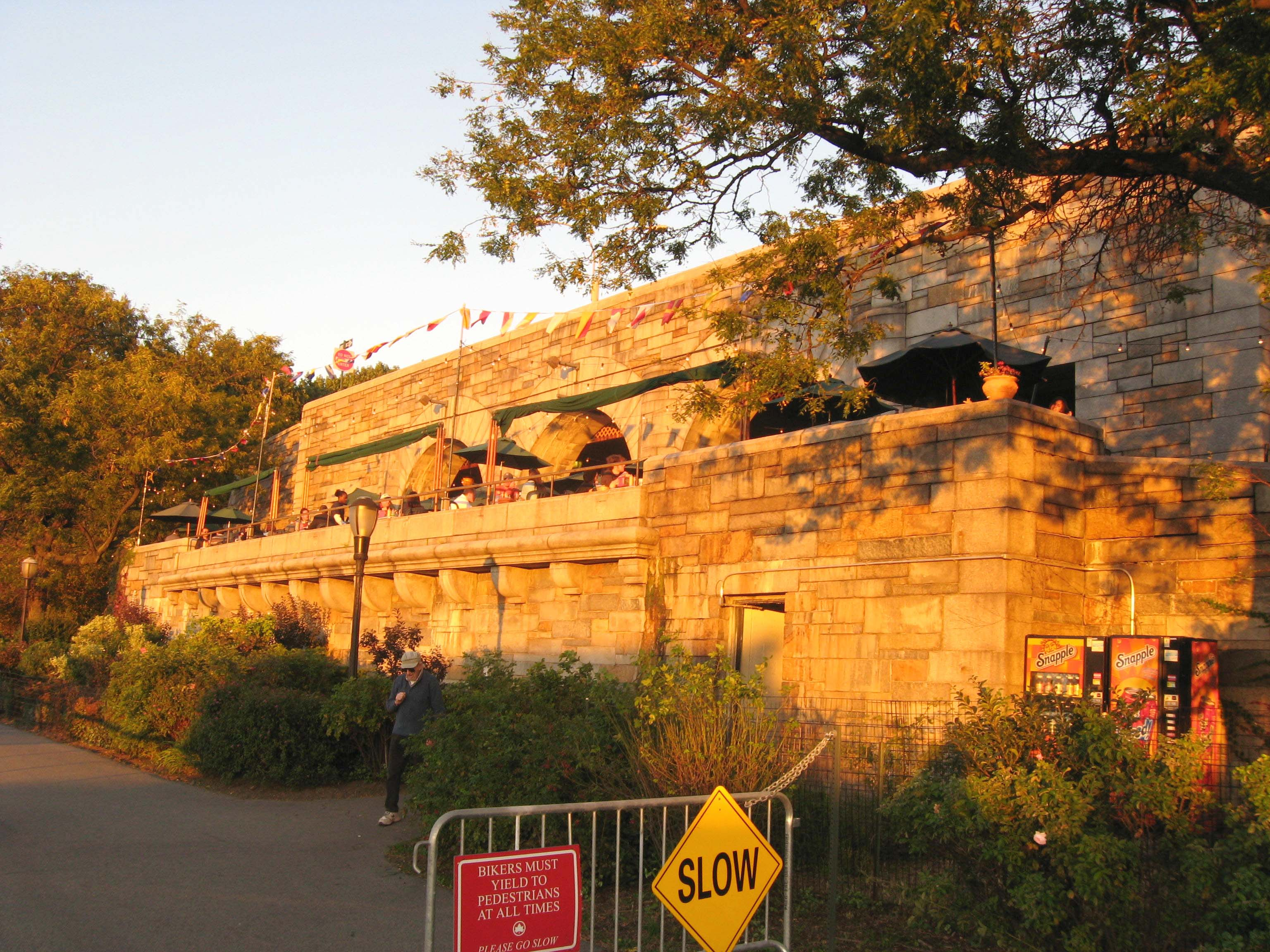
The Boat Basin Cafe inside the rotunda, 2008

The 79th Street Boat Basin is one of the boating facilities in Riverside Park. The basin contained 116 slips and was used as a launch site for kayaks, canoes and sailboats. It took in hundreds of thousands of dollars in dock-fee revenues each year. NYC Parks provided fresh water lines and a boat pump-out system for sewage disposal at no additional cost, but all other services, including electricity, telephone, television, and internet access, were charged to boat owners. The marina closed for rebuilding in 2021.

Adjacent to the boat basin, the 79th Street Rotunda, a three-story traffic circle, allows access to the Henry Hudson Parkway and to the park from 79th Street. The rotunda is constructed with reinforced concrete clad with cut stone. An underground parking garage sits below it.

An arcade with vaulted Guastavino tiled ceilings surrounds the rotunda and overlooks the marina. Currently, it is the site of the open-air O'Neals' West 79th Street Boat Basin Cafe. The internal courtyard and seasonal cafe were added after a design competition.

The designs of the 79th Street Rotunda and Boat Basin have changed little since their construction. The structures were designed to make Riverside Park into a grand "river gate" for marine travelers.

==== 102nd Street Field House ====
The 102nd Street Field House, adjacent to the Freedom Tunnel structure, was completed in 1937. NYC Parks renovated it in 1964 but it was damaged by fire in the 1970s. NYC Parks renovated the Field House again starting in 2015.

==== Peter Jay Sharp Volunteer House ====
The Peter Jay Sharp Volunteer House is located at 107th Street. Built in the late 19th century, the structure was formerly a one-story limestone tool shed that had become dilapidated over the years. In 2003, the architects Murphy Burnham & Buttrick converted the building into an architectural folly, adding a mezzanine and second floor, expanding the floor area from 500 to 1,550 square feet (46 to 144 m^{2}). The Riverside Park Conservancy operates out of the building, with facilities to aid their operation, including: storage space, plant-growing areas, a restroom, a kitchenette, and a meeting room on the second floor.

== Activities ==
Riverside Park's numerous recreation facilities include tennis, volleyball and basketball courts; soccer fields; and a skatepark.

=== Play areas ===
Riverside Park contains several playgrounds. All of the following playgrounds are located near the intersection with Riverside Drive unless otherwise stated.

- Little Engine Playground, at Riverside Boulevard between 67th and 68th Streets
- Classic Playground, at 74th Street
- Neufeld Playground, at 76th Street
- River Run Playground, at 83rd Street
- Hippo Playground, at 91st Street
- Dinosaur Playground, at 97th Street
- 101st St. Soccer Field, at 101st Street
- Riverside Park, at 119th Street
- Claremont, at 124th Street
- Riverbank Playground, at 142nd Street
- Ten Mile River, at 148th Street
- Palisades Playground, at 148th Street

Playgrounds that are designated as "Tot Lots" include:

- Tot Lot One Hundred Five, at 105th Street
- Tot Lot One Hundred And Ten, at 110th–111th Streets
- Tot Lot One Hundred And Twelve, at 112th–113th Streets
- Tot Lot One Hundred And Sixteen, at 116th–117th Streets

Riverside Park contains three dog runs at 72nd, 87th, and 105th Streets.

In addition, Riverside Park contains Riverside Skatepark at 109th Street. It was the first full-sized public skatepark in Manhattan, designed and built in 1995 by skateboarder and skatepark builder Andy Kessler.

=== Recreation ===
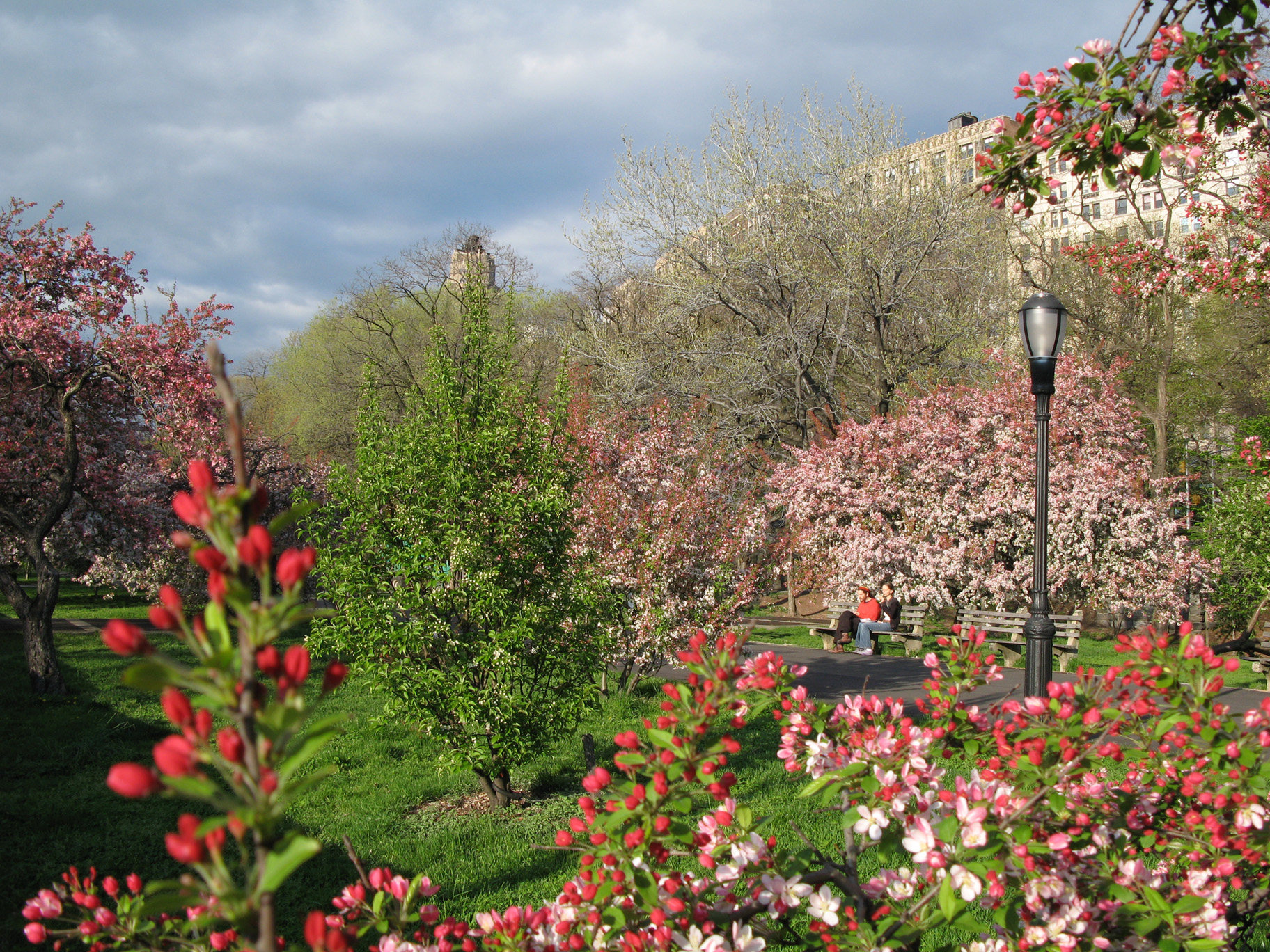
Springtime in Riverside Park, 2007

Riverside Park contains a number of facilities. There are nine baseball fields in the park, including five standalone fields (four from 104th to 107th Streets and one at 72nd Street), as well as two pairs of baseball fields that each overlap with another sporting field, at 77th and 146th/147th Streets. There are also five sets of basketball courts at 71st, 76th, 102nd, 111th, and 148th Streets. Seven handball courts are located in Riverside Park, five at 111th Street and two at 71st Street, as well as 20 tennis courts, ten each at 96th and 119th Streets. There are also six soccer fields, at 71st, 74th, 77th, 101st, 103rd, and 107th Streets. Volleyball courts are located at 102nd, 105th, and 148th Streets. Most of the facilities were built in the 1930s reconstruction of Riverside Park, except a recreational building near West 91st Street, as well as the Columbia University tennis courts near 119th–121st Streets.

A free season of events, named Summer on the Hudson, takes place throughout Riverside Park between May and October and hosts events for all including movies, concerts, and children's shows. In addition to the 79th Street Boat Basin, there is a kayak launch at 148th Street. During the spring and the summer, a free kayak rental also operates at 72nd Street.

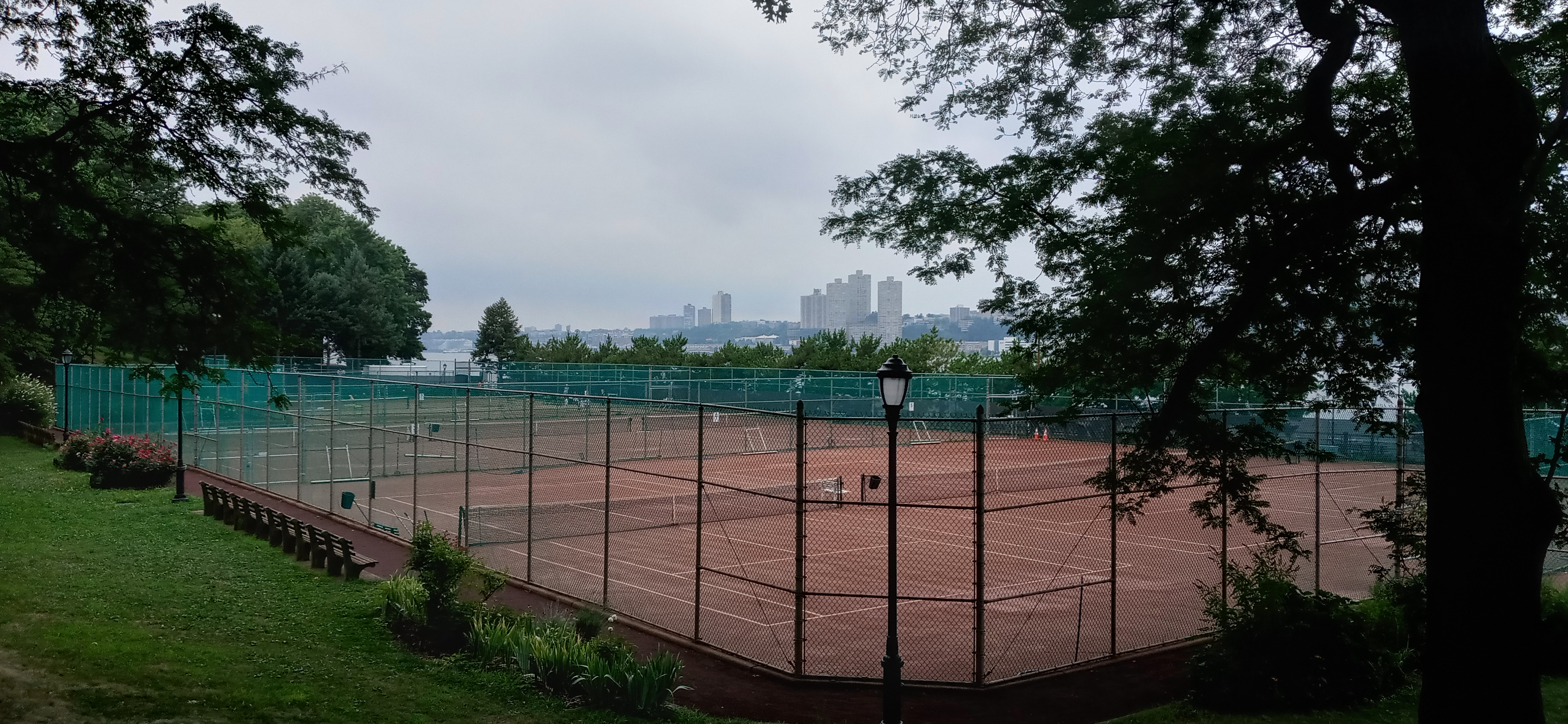
96th Street Clay Tennis Courts, 2022

The Riverside Clay Tennis Association (RCTA) operates ten red-clay tennis courts near 96th Street, which are open to the general public.

== Management ==
The Riverside Park Conservancy, a nonprofit park conservancy, maintains the park. while NYC Parks owns and operates the land and facilities. The Conservancy's responsibilities include maintaining and restoring park areas, as well as providing educational and cultural programs. In the fiscal year ending December 31, 2019, the Conservancy had net assets (own equity) of about $4.82 million and liabilities of $1.34 million, which amounted to total assets of $6.16 million. Net assets increased $630,000 from the fiscal year ending December 31, 2018.

In the late 1970s, New York City's park system was in bad shape: underfunded and plagued with crime. As a result, the Riverside Park Fund was founded in 1987 as a grassroots community organization formed to reclaim the park by establishing community gardens and improving park maintenance. The Fund was renamed the Riverside Park Conservancy in 2012. Merritt Birnbaum, who was previously executive director of the Friends of Governor's Island, was named President & CEO in 2022. It has 30 staff who focus on park programs and projects, including gardens, playgrounds, sports fields, monuments and landscaping. Cumulatively the Conservancy had received $6.6 million in private donations and had spent 80,000 worker-hours on restoring the park. Past chairs of the Conservancy have included New York State Assemblyman Micah Lasher.

=== Robert M. Morgenthau Citizenship Award ===
The Robert M. Morgenthau Citizenship Award was created by the Riverside Park Conservancy in 2016, in honor of Robert Morgenthau, the former Manhattan District Attorney. It is granted each year for service to the park and the community.

== Transportation ==
There are several New York City Subway stations within two blocks of the park. The 1, 2, and 3 trains run on the Broadway–Seventh Avenue Line, paralleling the adjacent Riverside Drive for much of its length. Direct bus service is provided by the M5 and M11 buses along Riverside Drive, as well as the M79 SBS, Bx11 and Bx15 crosstown routes.

== See also ==
- List of New York City Designated Landmarks in Manhattan from 59th to 110th Streets
- List of New York City scenic landmarks
- List of parks in New York City
- National Register of Historic Places listings in Manhattan from 59th to 110th Streets
