= Soldiers' and Sailors' Monument (Manhattan) =

Monument in Manhattan, New York

- Soldiers and Sailors Monument
- U.S. Historic district – Contributing property
- New York State Register of Historic Places
- New York City Landmark
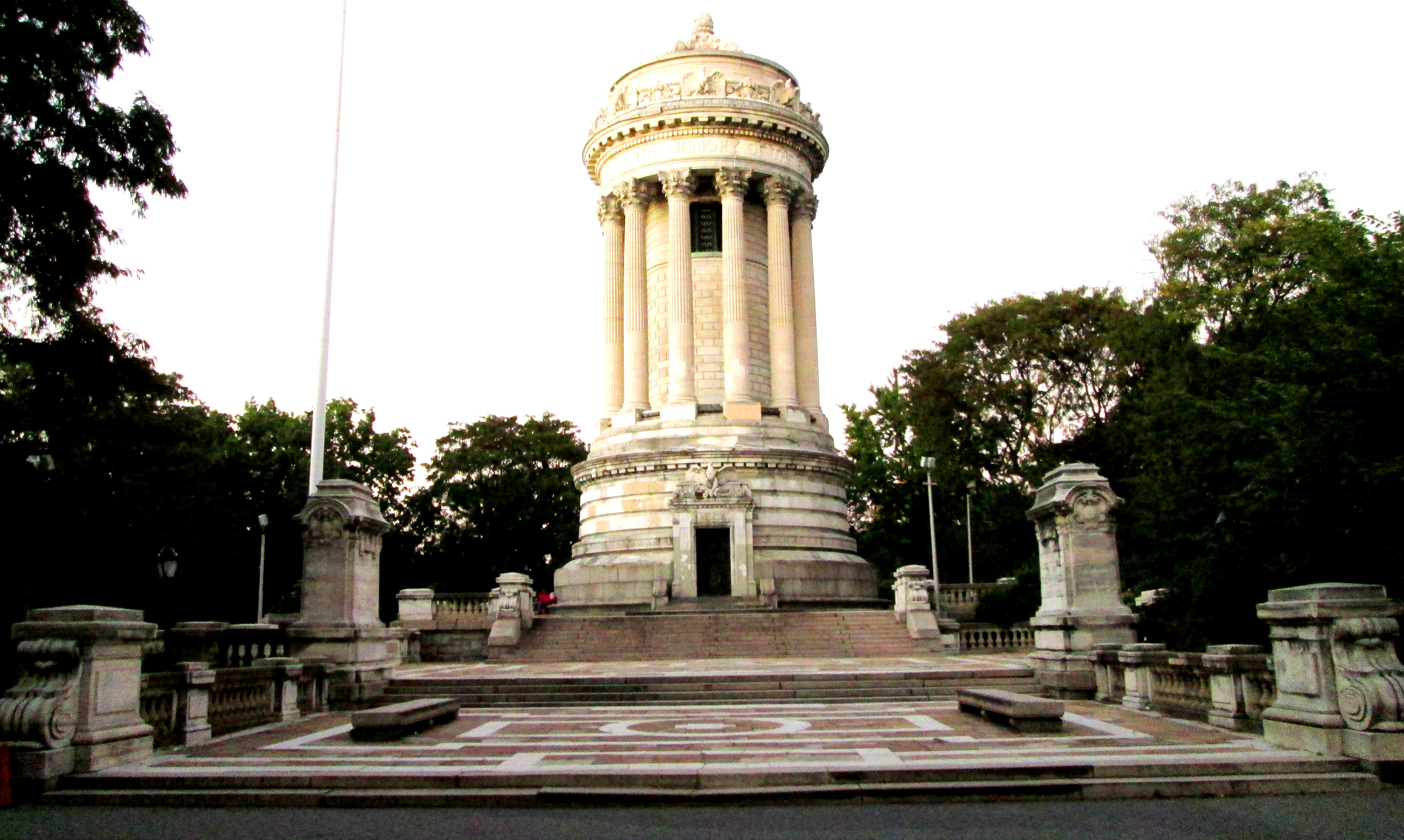
- The monument site in 2016
- Location: Riverside Park, Manhattan, New York City
- Coordinates: 40°47′32″N 73°58′44″W
- Built: 1900–1902
- Architect: Stoughton & Stoughton
- Part of: Riverside Park and Drive (ID83001743)
- NYSRHP No.: 06101.000383
- NYCL No.: 0932

Significant dates
- Designated CP: September 2, 1983
- Designated NYSRHP: July 12, 1983
- Designated NYCL: September 14, 1976

The Soldiers' and Sailors' Memorial Monument is located in Riverside Park, at the intersection of 89th Street and Riverside Drive, on the Upper West Side of Manhattan in New York City. It commemorates Union Army soldiers and sailors who served in the American Civil War. It is an enlarged version of the Choragic Monument of Lysicrates in Athens, and was designed by the firm of Stoughton & Stoughton with Paul E. M. DuBoy. The monument was completed May 26, 1902.

== History ==
=== Early history ===
The monument was first suggested in 1869. However, little was done to create the monument until 1893 – at a time the memory of the war was fading and there was a wave of nostalgia for the Civil War in the country – when the New York State legislature established a Board of Commissioners for a monument to the soldiers and sailors who had served in the Union Army during the American Civil War. Originally set to be built at 59th Street and Fifth Avenue then at Mount Tom (83rd Street and Riverside Drive) the project was delayed for many years because many organizations in the city could not agree on a site for the monument. When the final site was selected, the winning design for the monument had to be redesigned for the new site.

Ground was broken for the monument on September 21, 1900. City Council President Randolph Guggenheimer turned the first spadeful of dirt. About 200 people were present at the ground breaking ceremony. The first stone was laid in January 1901. On the cornerstone was a simple inscription saying that the monument was erected by the citizens of New York. It was finally dedicated on Memorial Day in 1902 with President Theodore Roosevelt officiating. During the dedication, the monument was unveiled following a parade of Civil War veterans up Riverside Drive. The memorial bears the simple inscription: "To the memory of the brave soldiers and sailors who saved the Union". The monument cost $300,000 to erect. Granite quarried from the Lacasse Quarry located at Derby, Orleans County, Vermont, was used in the construction.

The white marble monument was designed after a public competition won by architects Charles and Arthur Stoughton. Their design was known as the "Temple of Fame". The ornamental features were carved by Paul E. M. Duboy (1857–1907), who also was the architect of The Ansonia, an apartment building also on the Upper West Side. Inspired by Greek antiquity, the monument is based on the Choragic Monument of Lysicrates in Athens. The monument takes the form of a peripteral Corinthian temple raised on a high base, with a tall cylindrical rusticated cella, that carries a low conical roof like a lid, ringed by twelve Corinthian columns. Plinths at the entrance to the raised terrace are incised with the names of the New York volunteer regiments and the battles in which they served, as well as Union generals.

=== 1900s to 1960s ===
The monument c. 1908

By 1907, there were already reports by Mayor George B. McClellan Jr., that the Monument was in need of repair. At that time there were marble slabs in danger of falling from their place; three had already fallen. The building badly leaked, cement was constantly falling from the walls and ceiling, and stone was chipped in many places. He requested $20,000 for the repair of the monument.

A large adjustment to the monument took place in the 1930s, when the plaza's yellow brick, which nicely contrasted with the white marble trim, was replaced with the orange-colored stone common to Parks Department projects of the period. However, these have since chipped and are splitting. The memorial was also given a complete coating of protective paraffin, used at that time to preserve the memorial. In 1962, the City spent over $1 million in extensive repairs to the monument, including a new roof, which had deteriorated, and portions of the monument were replaced with more durable granite.

=== 1970s to present ===
The monument was designated a New York City landmark in 1976, and it was designated a New York state landmark in 2001. Meanwhile, the monument continued to deteriorate after its 1960s renovation. The Parks Department had proposed a $1.2 million restoration in 2002. The effort was to restore the monument's steps and sidewalks. The effort failed when a private donor pulled out. In July 2005, the New York Times reported "up close the dilapidation is clearly visible. Pave-stones, many damaged by skateboarding and soccer playing, need replacing. The paint covering the many splotches of graffiti is tacky. And the tomblike interior, which is leaking, has long been closed to the public."

In 2007, Gale Brewer, a member of the City Council, committed $650,000 in city money to a redesign of the potholed asphalt plaza south of the monument, with its three Civil War-era cannons. However, that effort bogged down in disagreement on the exact nature of the designs and was never completed. A fence was put up to keep people off the entry stairs because they were in very poor condition in 2008. In March 2014, an attempt to raise $5.5 million was attempted by the Riverside Park Conservancy following a $1.5 million survey done by the park system. The monument currently has many coatings of anti-graffiti paint. The ornamental bronze doorway has been damaged by vandals. At some point the richly sculptured bronze flagpole base, which featured ship forms, wreaths and other elements, was removed. The park system noted, "the monument is awaiting funding to repair loosened joints, chipped stone, and the damage generally wrought by time if not vandalism."

A study performed in 2017 estimated the cost of fully repairing the monument had grown to $36.5 million, and would continue to become more expensive the longer the city government waits. The structure was fenced off and closed to the public after the 2017 inspection found the structure's retaining wall to be failing. A NY1 cable news report from 2019 found that much of the monument's mortar had deteriorated entirely and that the mosaic tiles had degraded so much that they "looked like gravel". As of 2021, there still had been no funding allocated for repairs. Mayor Eric Adams allocated $62 million for the monument's restoration in fiscal year 2024. Following the allocation of city funding, work on the restoration began in 2024 when drones began surveying the monument.

== Design ==
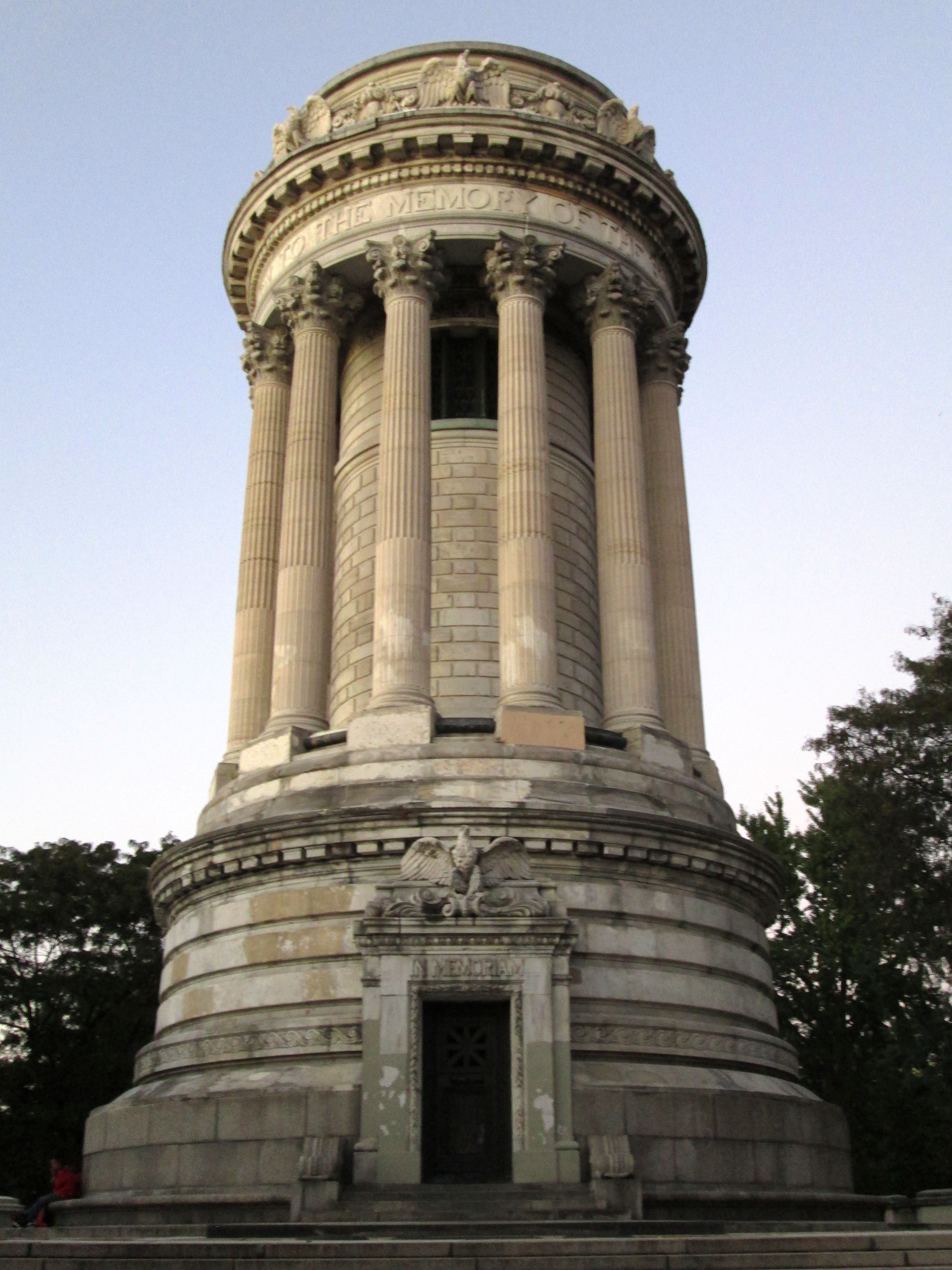
The central structure of the monument in 2016

The monument was intended to stand at the center of a complex sequence of balustraded formal paved terraces and stairs that would have rationalized the steep natural slopes to north and west, but were eliminated in the execution. (Note: The paved plaza that leads to it was renovated in 1937 and again in 2008; three bronze cannon, each weighing 8508 pounds, are inscribed with their weight, the maker's initials (S.C.L. S. McM. & CO) and the date 1865.) Its site, at a curve in Riverside Drive, makes it visible from a distance, a desirable feature for a monument in the City Beautiful movement. Originally, there was a planned stairway to the river and a battlemented wall to the south but these were never built. It appears that the area south of the plaza was simply paved, or perhaps treated with pebbles. On the south side of the monument are two mounted cannons. On the west side of the memorial, the back steps to the terraces offer views of the Hudson River.

The monument measures approximately 100 feet (30 m) tall and 50 feet (15 m) deep. The initial design called for the monument to be crowned with a statue of Peace "of heroic size" but this was not done.

The sculptured bronze door at the base of the monument, now kept locked, was originally open to visitors. Currently, the interior is open one day annually at Open House New York. The interior is entirely revetted with the same veined white marble used on the exterior. The interior is in two stages, with six niches in the lower stage, corresponding to the exterior basement, and an upper stage of tall Corinthian pilasters flanking plain panels; above is a ribbed interior dome with a central lantern. The mosaic on the floor is a star centered on a bronze relief medallion of the US arms, with crossed oak and laurel sprays.

The exterior colonnade carries an entablature adorned with a full frieze containing the inscriptions "To the memory of the Brave Soldiers and Sailors Who Saved the Union". A cresting of eagles alternating with cartouches surmounts the cornice. The monument terminates in a low conical roof crowned by a richly decorated marble finial.

The Riverside Park Conservancy maintains the plantings in the area surrounding the monument.

== Use ==
=== Parades and celebrations ===
Large Memorial Day celebrations have been centered on this monument. The number of people and interest in the Memorial Day celebrations at this monument have varied greatly and at times have been very significant. On Memorial Day 1907, 16,000 men marched in a Grand Army of the Republic parade. However, in 1910, in a celebration headed by President Taft only 1,500 showed up. In 1911, 20,000 men and 150 organizations took part in the Memorial Day parade. Then in 1914, 9,000 men were noted in the New York Times article, in a parade from 72nd street to the monument. In 1922, the Memorial Day parade attracted 14,000 participants. The numbers dwindled, and events in the 1990s attracted only a few dozen people. After the September 11 attacks, the numbers grew.

=== Backdrops ===
In addition to annual Memorial Day celebrations, the monument has been used in scenes and as a backdrop of movies such as The Odd Couple, Godspell and Parting Glances as well as a backdrop to TV shows Law & Order and Sex and the City. It was also known as a "gay cruising area" in the 60's. In the mid-1980s the West Side Arts Coalition provided midsummer dance programs on the steps of the monument at 89th street. Since 2004, the monument has served as the home of the Hudson Classical Theater Company. They perform classic plays including Shakespeare works and original plays on the back steps of the monument in summer months.

== See also ==
- List of New York City Designated Landmarks in Manhattan from 59th to 110th Streets
- National Register of Historic Places listings in Manhattan from 59th to 110th Streets
