= Stanley Brook Bridge =

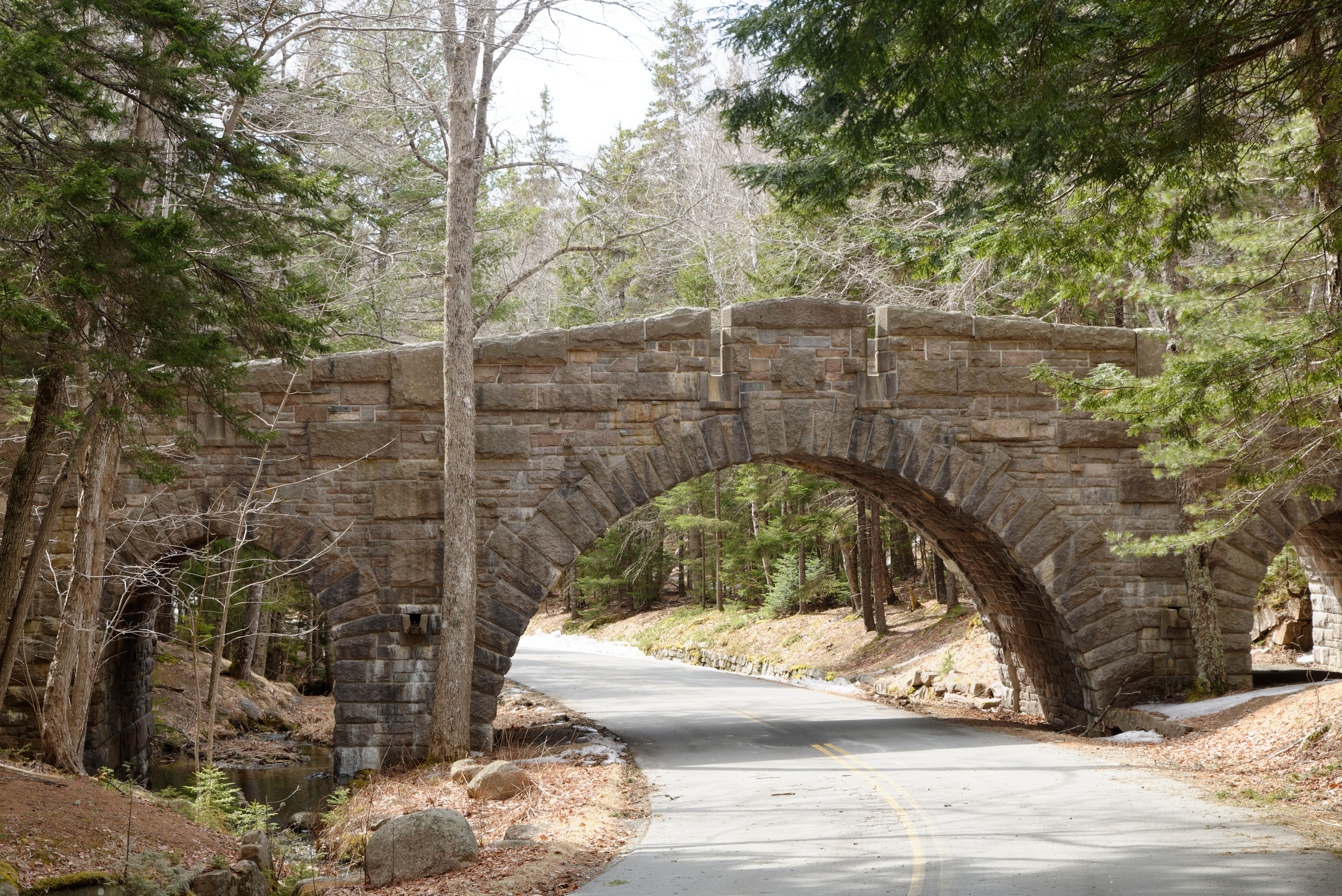
- The bridge in 2019, looking north along Stanley Brook Road, with Stanley Brook on the left
- Coordinates: 44.3104°N 68.2469°W
- Carries: Stanley Brook carriage trail
- Crosses: Stanley Brook Road; Stanley Brook
- Locale: Seal Harbor, Maine

Characteristics
- Total length: 180 feet (55 m)
- Height: 23 feet (7 m)

History
- Architect: Charles Stoughton
- Opened: 1933 (92 years ago)

Statistics
- Toll: No

Stanley Brook Bridge is a bridge in Acadia National Park, Maine. Spanning Stanley Brook carriage trail and Stanley Brook itself in Seal Harbor, it was built in 1933. It was the last bridge designed and constructed in the park under the guidance of John D. Rockefeller Jr.

The bridge, which is constructed of ashlar stone, was designed by Charles Stoughton and built by S. F. Ralston, superintendent of Rockefeller's Seal Harbor estate. Landscape architect Beatrix Ferrand planted fauna around the bridge. At 180 feet (55 m) in the length, the bridge has three spans: the western one passes over Stanley Brook; the central one crosses Stanley Brook Road; and the eastern span is over a footpath.
