= Stoughton & Stoughton =

American architectural firm

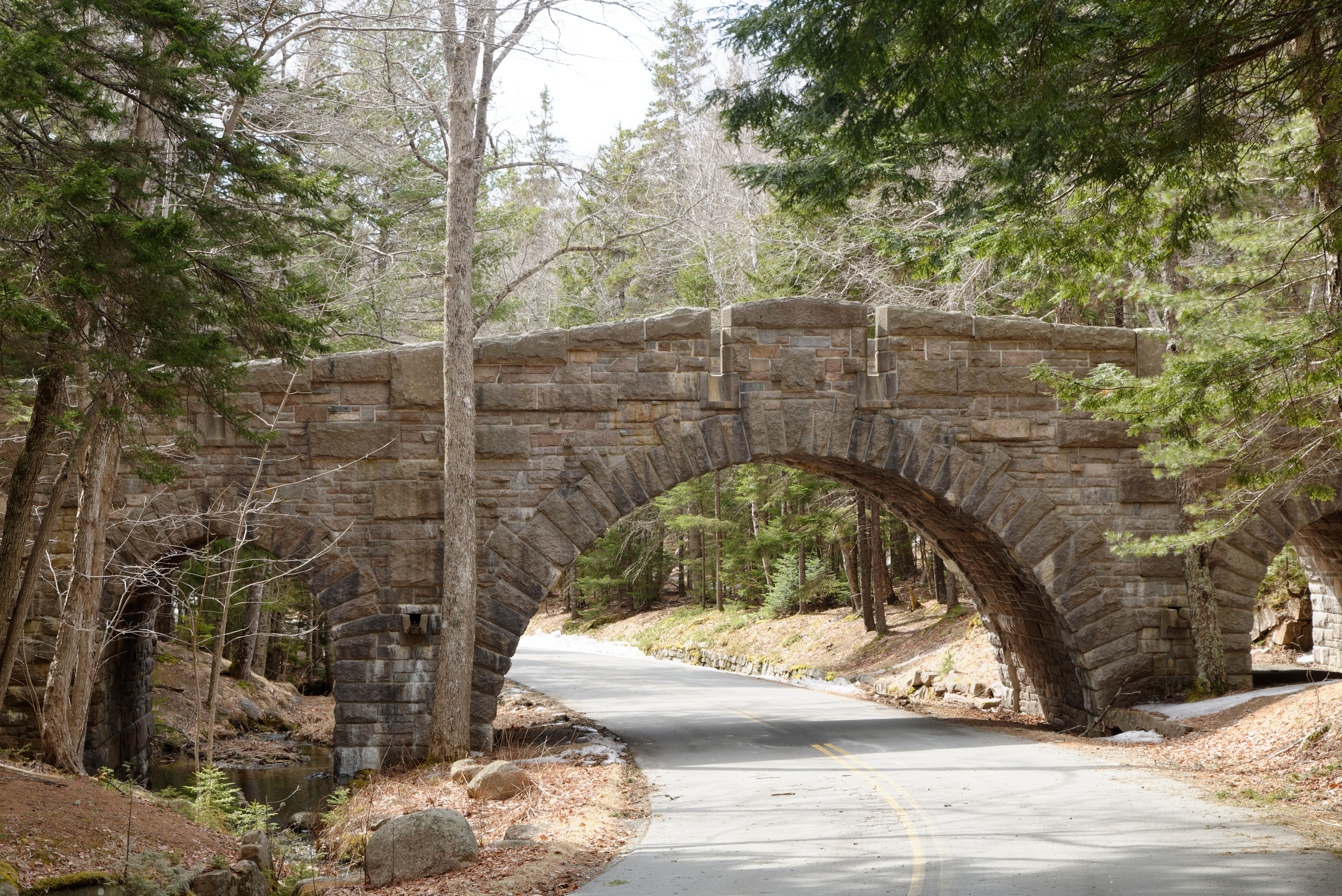
Stanley Brook Bridge

Stoughton & Stoughton was a New York-based architectural firm comprising the partnership of Charles (1860–1944) and Arthur Alexander Stoughton (1867–1955), brothers who were born in Mount Vernon, New York. Arthur graduated from Columbia University in 1888 and trained at the École des Beaux-Arts, Paris, which matured an accomplished academic classical style, known especially in the United States, as Beaux-Arts architecture. In this vein, among their joint public commissions was the Soldiers' and Sailors' Monument (New York), dedicated on Memorial Day 1902. The firm won a competition for the design. Following this commission they were asked to design the 41st Precinct Station House on Mosholu Parkway, in Norwood, the Bronx, which is now the station house for the 52nd Precinct. The building is of red brick and architectural terracotta, with a clock tower.

By 1915 Arthur had moved to Winnipeg, Manitoba, where he founded the department of architecture at the University of Manitoba. He returned in 1915 to give a talk in Boston to the National Conference on City Planning on "The architectural side of city planning". He remained in Winnipeg until his retirement in 1930. He designed the University's Fort Garry campus and was commissioned to design the University's Buller Building (1932) and the Tier Building. He designed three bridges for the city of Winnipeg.
