= Inspiration Point =

Inspiration Point may refer to:

- Inspiration Point (Bryce Canyon), a viewpoint in the Bryce Amphitheater area of Bryce Canyon National Park
- Inspiration Point (Hudson River Greenway), a rest stop for cyclists along the Hudson River Greenway in Manhattan, New York, US
- Inspiration Point (video series), a web series created by AOL On
- Inspiration Point (Yellowstone), a promontory cliff on the north rim of the Grand Canyon of the Yellowstone, Wyoming, US
- Inspiration Point Shelter House, a historic building in Fort Worth, Texas, US
