= Harlem River Park =

Public park in Manhattan along the Harlem River

Coordinates: 40°48′55″N 73°56′2″W

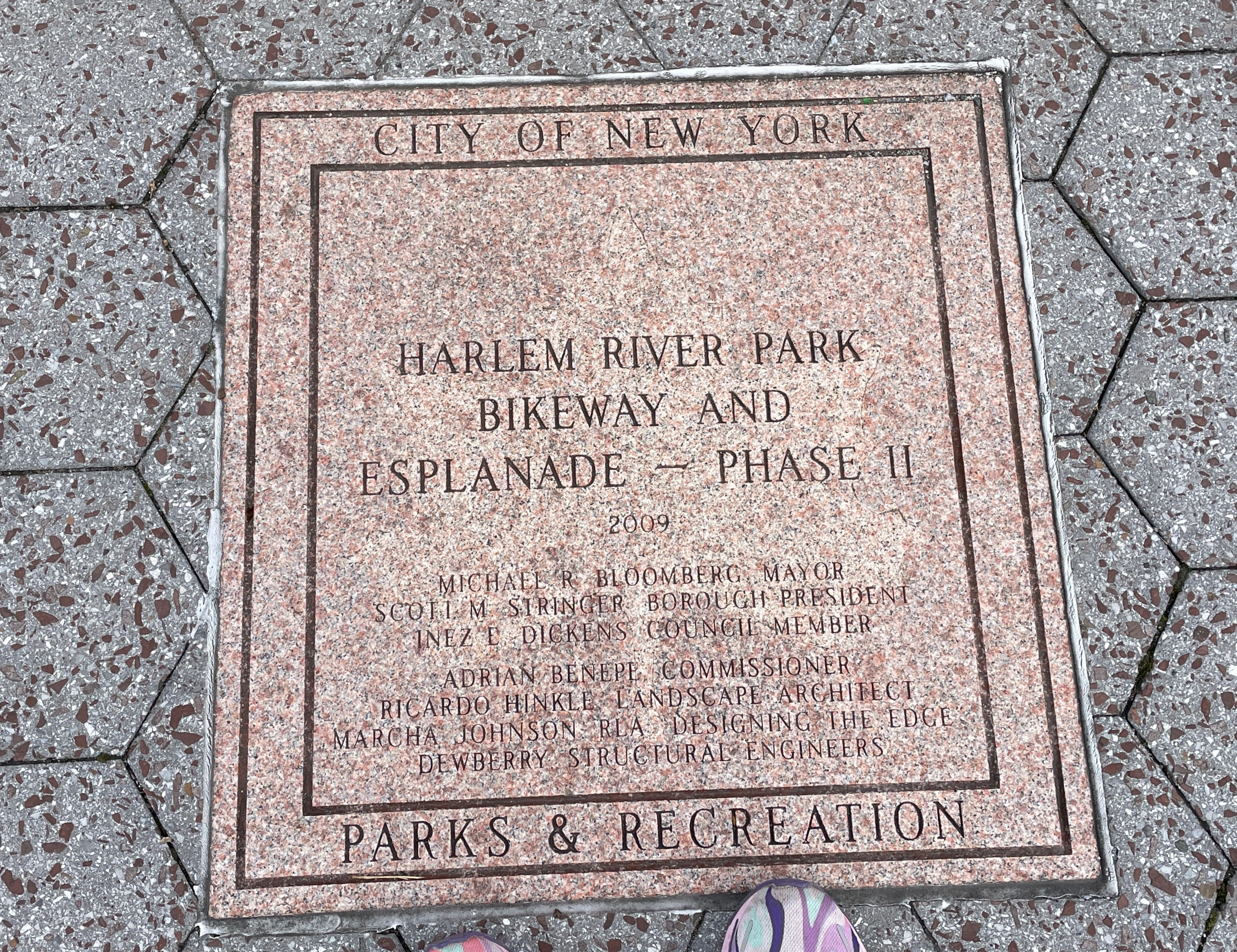
Marker, Phase II Harlem River Park, 2009

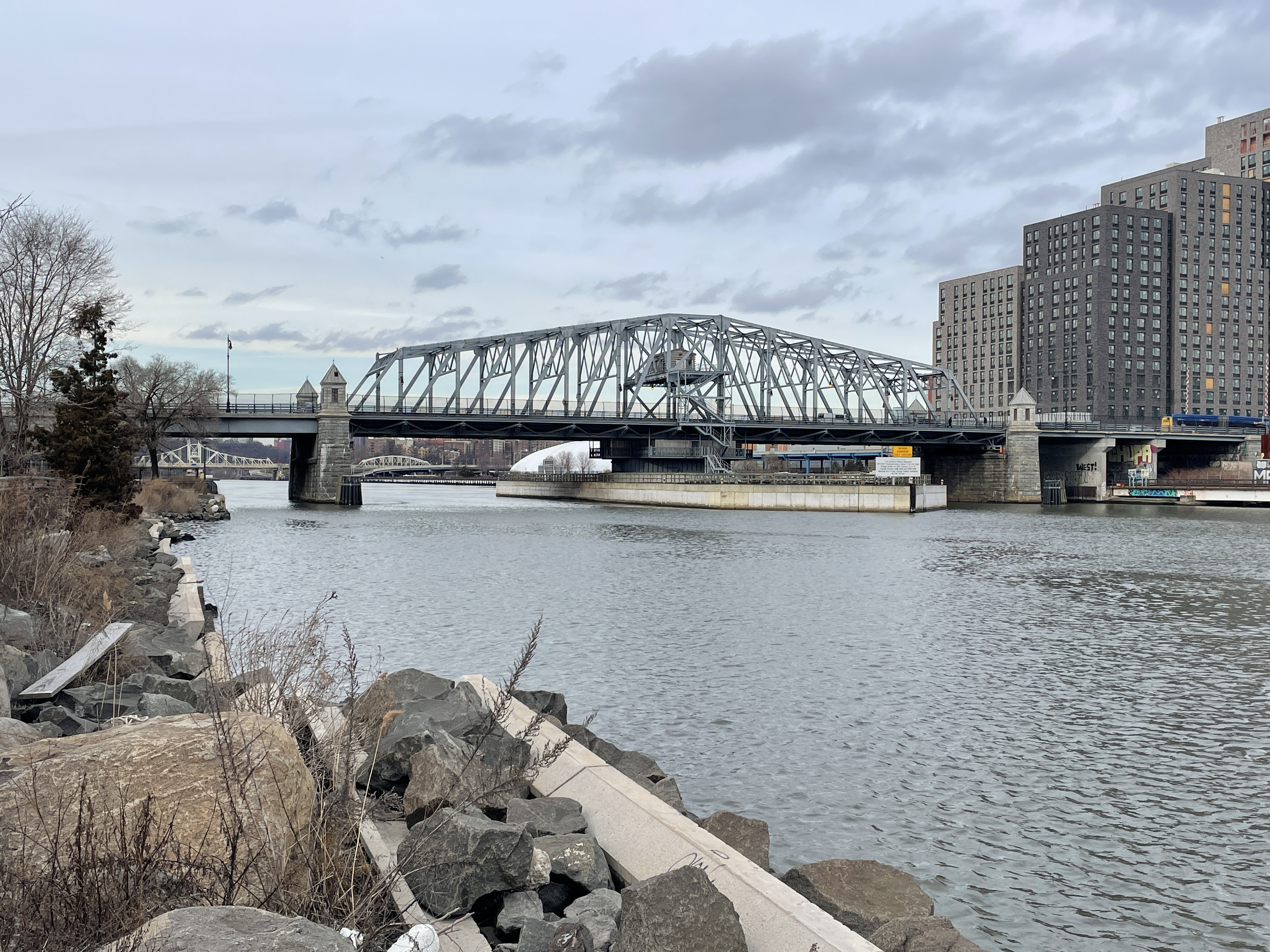
145th Street Bridge from Harlem River Park

Harlem River Park is a portion of the Manhattan Waterfront Greenway that runs along the Harlem River from 145th Street south to 135th Street near the 369th Regiment Armory. In 1997, under Rudy Giuliani and NYC Parks Commissioner Henry Stern, the mayor's office provided approximately $380,000 to explore the park's creation and construction began in 2001 to extend the East River Greenway north from the 125th Street terminus in what was, by 2017, called the Harlem Greenway Link.

The park includes murals, including ones in tribute to Harlem's cultural history, and preservationists have discussed a so-called "Grand Harlem Park" encompassing this and others adjacent.
