= Fort Washington Park (Manhattan) =

Public park in Manhattan, New York

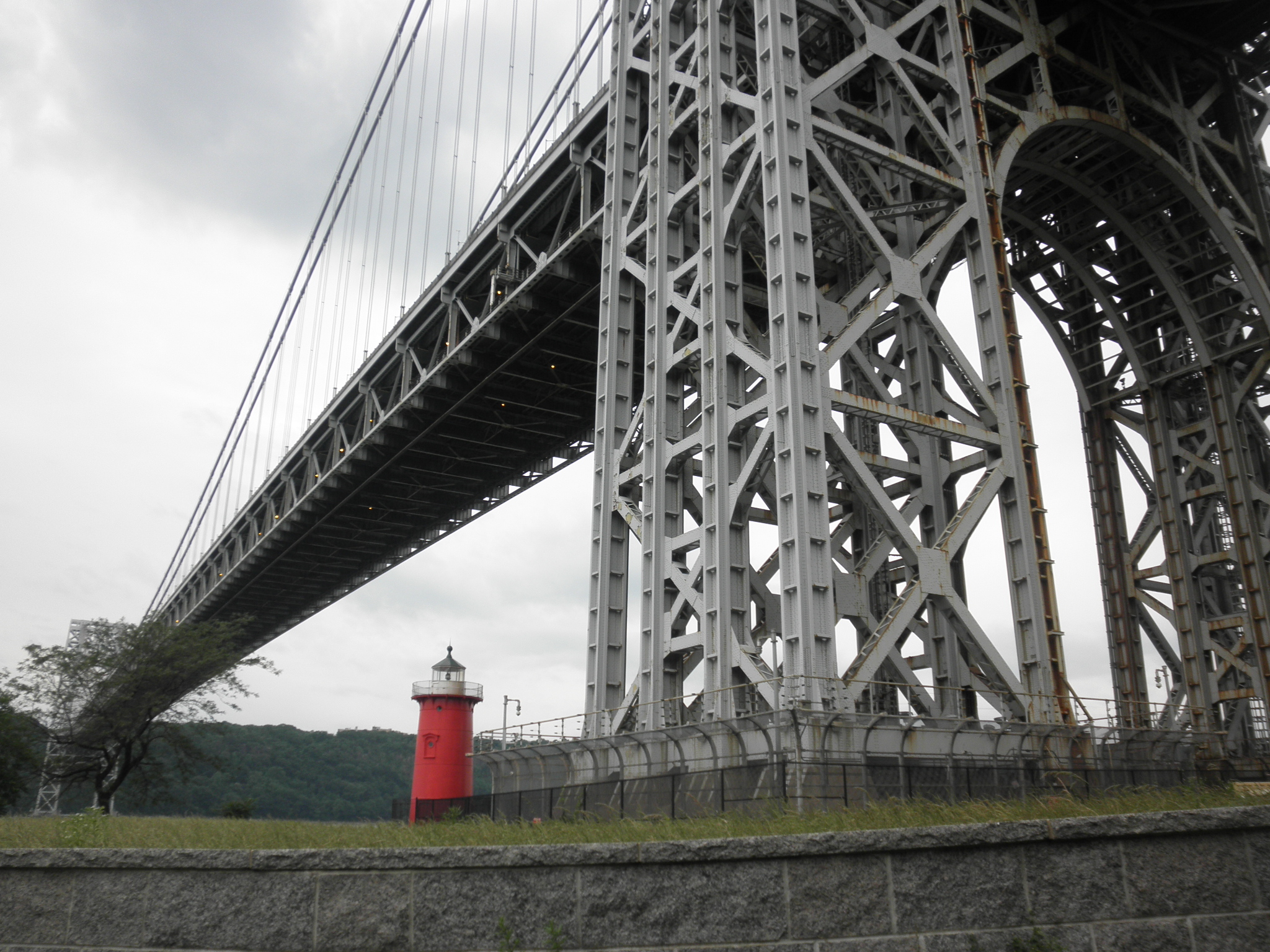
- Fort Washington Park view of the Little Red Lighthouse and George Washington Bridge
- Interactive map of Fort Washington Park
- Location: Along the Hudson River from 155th Street to Dyckman Street; Upper Manhattan, New York
- Coordinates: 40°50′58″N 73°56′48″W
- Area: 160 acres (65 ha)
- Created: 1896
- Etymology: Fort Washington
- Operator: NYC Parks
- Open: 6 a.m. to 1 a.m.
- Website: http://www.nycgovparks.org/parks/fort-washington-park

Fort Washington Park is a public park located in the Washington Heights section of Upper Manhattan in New York City. It runs along the banks of the Hudson River next to Riverside Drive and the Henry Hudson Parkway from West 155th Street to Dyckman Street. The George Washington Bridge crosses above the park; below the bridge is a small point of land called Jeffrey's Hook, which is the site of the Little Red Lighthouse.

The 160-acre (65 ha) park features riverside views of the New Jersey Palisades and the George Washington Bridge. Amenities include pedestrian and greenway paths, baseball fields, basketball courts, tennis courts, volleyball courts, a soccer field and a playground.

== Etymology ==
The name references the nearby site of Fort Washington, a fortified position where the Battle of Fort Washington took place in 1776 during the American Revolutionary War. The fort is physically located and commemorated in Bennett Park.

== Geography ==
Fort Washington Park covers 160 acres (65 ha). It is bounded on the west by the Hudson River, on the north by Dyckman Street, on the east by the Henry Hudson Parkway, and on the south by 155th Street. The park contains connections to Inwood Hill Park to the north and Fort Tryon Park and Riverside Park to the south; all are part of the Manhattan Waterfront Greenway. The Henry Hudson Parkway (NY 9A) and Amtrak's Empire Connection run through the western part of the park.

== History ==
During the American Revolutionary War, a series of fortifications were built on the steep cliff east of the park's northeast corner, which was known by the Americans as Fort Washington. The actual site of Fort Washington is less than a mile south at Bennett Park. The area was an ancillary site of the Battle of Fort Washington, fought on November 16, 1776, in which British troops took Fort Washington after a two-hour battle, renaming it Fort Knyphausen, named after Hessian General Wilhelm von Knyphausen. The British peacefully withdrew from Manhattan in 1783. The fortification was later demolished and the surrounding area came to be known as Washington Heights. A rock commemorating the "American Redout" (using an archaic spelling of redoubt) is located in the park near 181st Street, at a location that is hard to access.

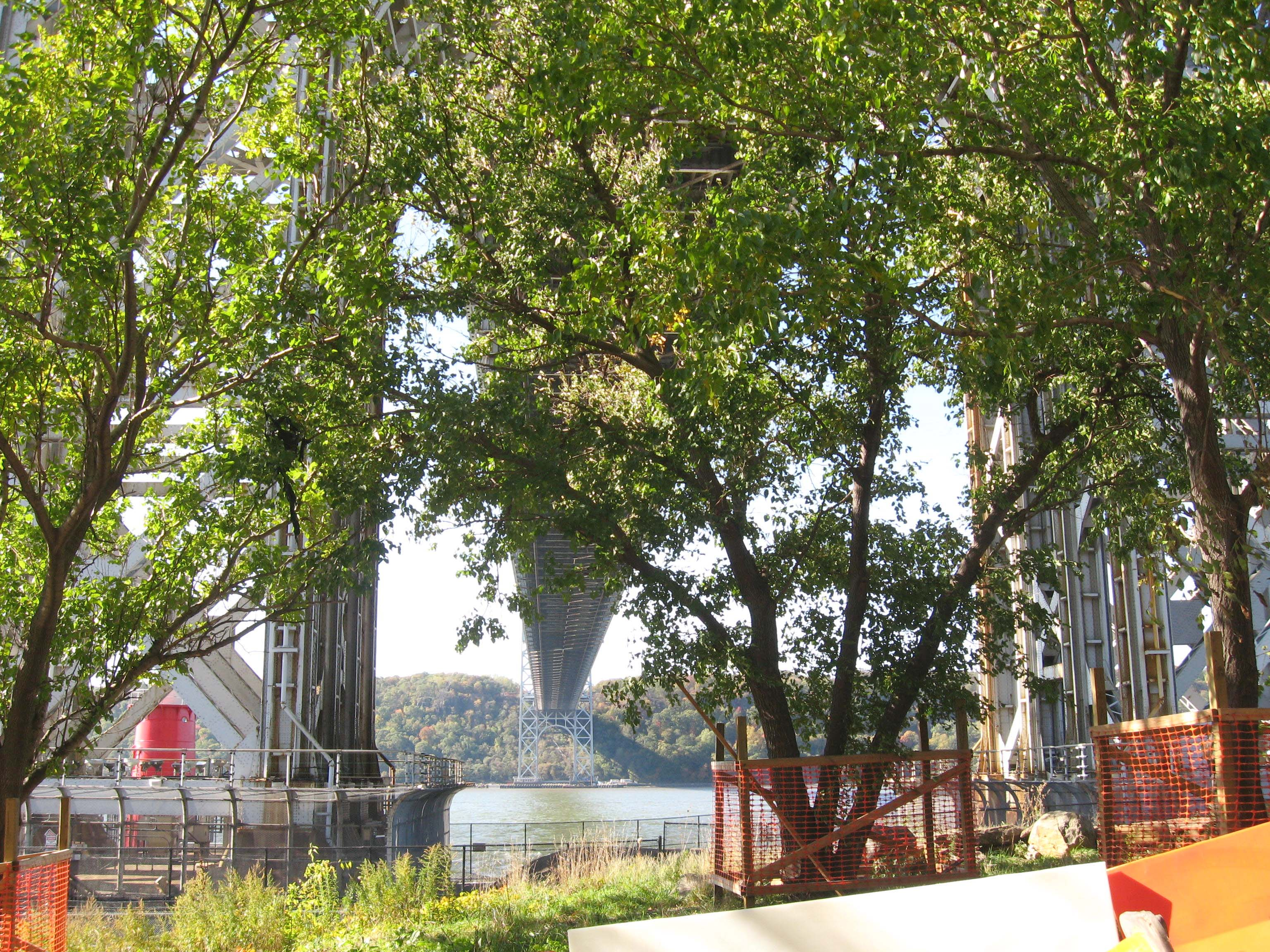
Pathway near 176th Street

During the construction of Riverside Park and Riverside Drive to the south in the late 19th century, Frederick Law Olmsted devised plans for Riverside, Fort Washington, and Morningside Parks, which called for these parks to be designed around the existing landscape. Fort Washington Park was created in 1894 through city legislation. Between 1896 and 1927, most of the parcels were acquired through five incidents of eminent domain.

Several plans for development within Fort Washington Park were proposed during the early 20th century, such as a plan to build a waterside annex for the West End Hotel in 1912, and a theater-and-comfort-station complex the following year. These were never built due to neighborhood opposition. Two structures were built within the park during this time: the Little Red Lighthouse and the Inspiration Point shelter. Improvements to the park in the 1910s, which entailed clearing hundreds of trees for bridle paths and walkways, resulted in a lawsuit from sculptor Gutzon Borglum. Another project in the same area concerned the presence of the New York Central Railroad's West Side Line (now the Empire Connection) within the park. In 1916, the railroad and local groups agreed on a plan to build a tunnel for the railroad under Riverside and Fort Washington Parks. Concurrently, Riverside Drive was to be extended northward through Fort Washington Park and to the Bronx.

In January 1917, John D. Rockefeller Jr. purchased Fort Tryon Park adjacent to the northeast corner of Fort Washington Park. That June, he announced that Fort Tryon would be given to the city on the conditions that it be joined to the existing Fort Washington and Riverside Parks on the Hudson River, and that the city maintain that park. To preserve the views from the parks along the Hudson River, Rockefeller had purchased land on the opposite side of the Hudson, thereby preventing it from being developed; this later became Palisades Interstate Park. The city acquired 30 acres (12 ha) of land in 1921 to connect the two park sites. In 1927, part of Fort Washington Park was given to the Port of New York Authority, which built the George Washington Bridge directly above the park. During construction, one advocacy group expressed concerns that the presence of the bridge's towers would degrade the quality of Fort Washington Park directly underneath. The bridge was opened in 1931 and the connection to Fort Tryon Park opened four years later. The Henry Hudson Parkway, running east of the park, opened in 1936.

In the following years, additional land for Fort Washington Park was acquired. This included from the Port of New York Authority in 1939, the New York City Board of Estimate in 1966, and the New York City Department of Real Property in 1989. A survey in 2013 found that Fort Washington Park was 24 acres (9.7 ha) larger than previously measured, making the park 160 acres in total.

Several improvements were also made to Fort Washington Park. As part of the construction of a nearby psychiatric facility at 165th Street in 1994, a new footbridge to the park was built. A marina at Dyckman Street was opened the following year, and the Lily Brown Playground was renovated from 2001 to 2002. In 2014, a $3.5 million, 1-mile (1.6 km) bicycle path was opened within the park, running from Dyckman Street to a dead end at 186th Street. A connection between the new bike path and the existing Manhattan Waterfront Greenway at 180th Street would cost $22 million, since it would require the construction of additional shoreline on the river.

== Structures ==
=== Inspiration Point ===
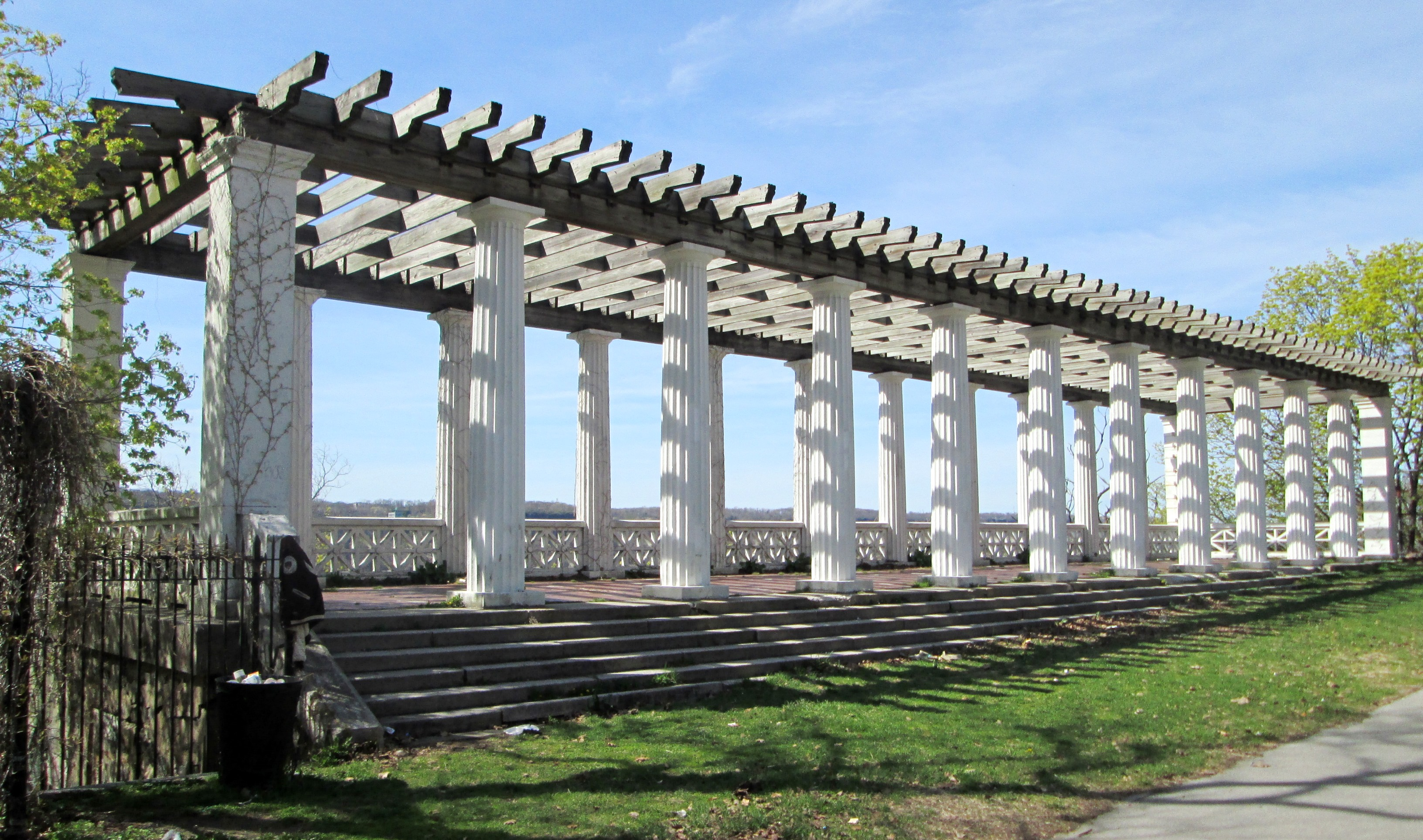
Inspiration Point

The Inspiration Point shelter is located in the park, close to the intersection of the Henry Hudson Parkway and 181st Street. It was designed in the Neoclassical style by Gustave Steinacher and opened in 1925. The shelter consisted of two levels: a deck with Doric columns and a wooden trellis on the upper story, and restrooms on the lower story. The shelter was popular among motorists who used it for private romantic encounters, but later fell into disuse.

=== Lighthouse ===
Closer view of the Little Red Lighthouse from the park

The Little Red Lighthouse is located on a spit of land under the George Washington Bridge, called Jeffrey's Hook. The current lighthouse, which replaced a rudimentary indicator, was initially located at Sandy Hook, New Jersey, and was decommissioned at that site in 1917. The United States Lighthouse Establishment moved the lighthouse to Fort Washington Park in 1921, and it was decommissioned in 1948, having become outdated after the George Washington Bridge's construction. The United States Coast Guard initially intended to sell off the lighthouse, but decided against doing so after protests from local children. Since 1951, NYC Parks has operated the lighthouse as part of Fort Washington Park. The Little Red Lighthouse is both on the National Register of Historic Places and a designated New York City Landmark.

=== Dyckman Street Boat Marina ===
The Dyckman Street Boat Marina is located at the northern tip of the park at the end of Dyckman Street. Formerly the site of a car float across the Hudson River, which closed in 1941, the land was given to NYC Parks in 1966. Twenty-one years later, Dyckman Marine Venture proposed redeveloping the car float site with a marina, pier, and restaurant, and NYC Parks gave the organization permission to use the site. The complex was partially paid through federal government funds due to an obscure stipulation in a federal law that primarily provided funds to suburban and rural fisheries. Completed in 1995, the marina also includes a fishing pier.

=== Recreational facilities ===
Fort Washington Park contains Lily Brown Playground at 162nd Street. Built on a parcel that was acquired in 1925, the playground is located on an embankment. It is named after Lily Brown, a local resident who in the 1980s and 1990s advocated for a renovation of the playground. The playground was restored in the early 2000s. The southern end of the park also contains two baseball fields, a soccer field, five softball fields, a basketball court, and ten handball courts. The area between 155th and 165th Streets is the only portion of Fort Washington Park with active recreational facilities.

== See also ==
- Fort Washington (Manhattan)
