= Manhattan Waterfront Greenway =

Esplanade in Manhattan, New York

Coordinates: 40.788°N 73.9836°W

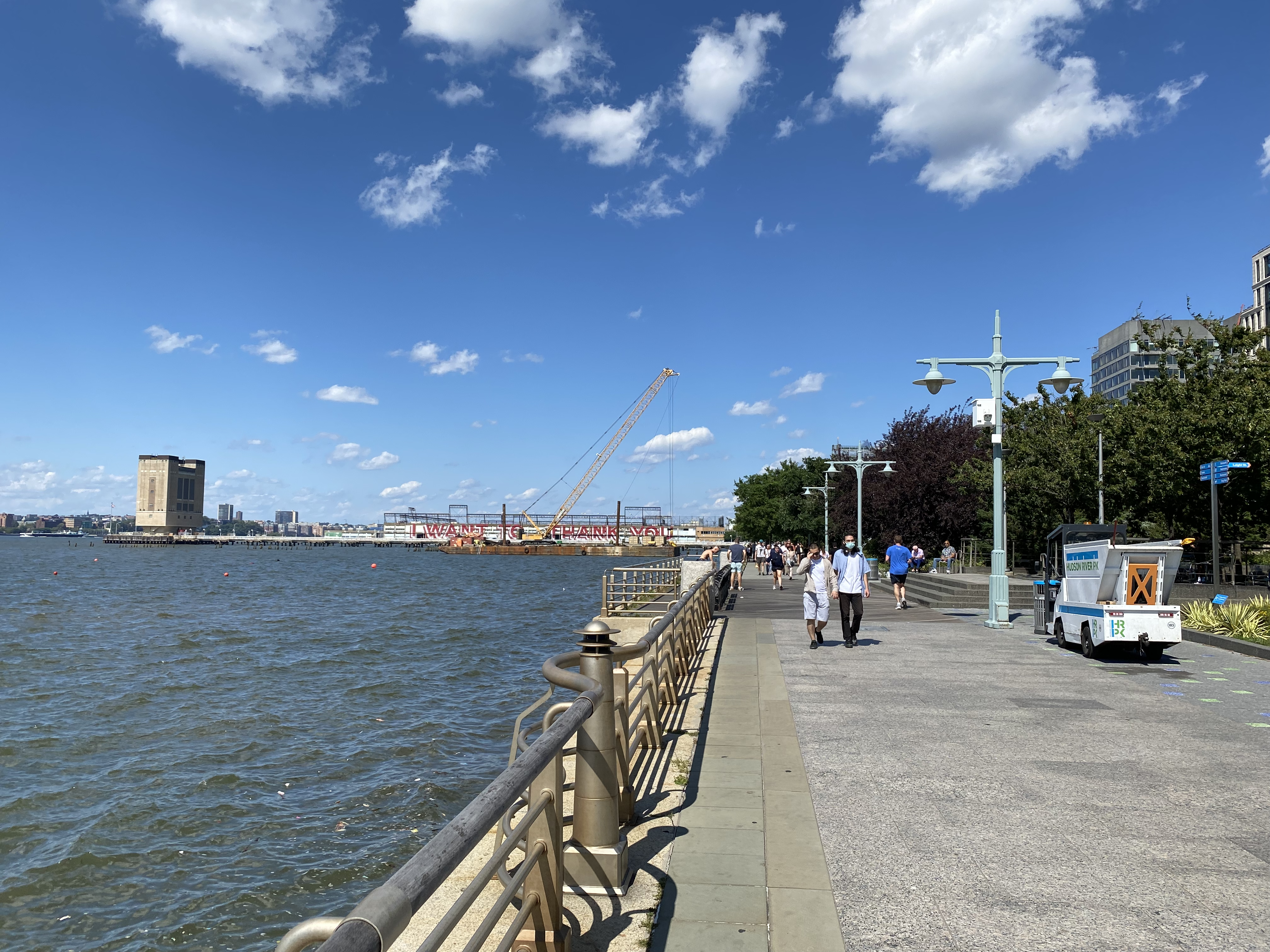
A pedestrian section in Hudson River Park in Tribeca in September 2021

Map of the greenway's route around Manhattan

The Manhattan Waterfront Greenway is a waterfront greenway for walking or cycling, 32 miles (51 km) long, around the island of Manhattan in New York City. The largest portions are operated by the New York City Department of Parks and Recreation. It is separated from motor traffic, and many sections also separate pedestrians from cyclists. There are three principal parts — the East, Harlem and Hudson River greenways.

The non-profit organization Shorewalkers NYC, launched in 1982, works to promote and preserve the Manhattan waterfront. Every year it organizes The Great Saunter, a 32-mile hike around Manhattan close to the waterline. The greenway, particularly the Hudson River Park section, has contributed to economic development along the waterfront, drawing millions of visitors annually. Storm protection projects are planned along portions of the greenway as part of the city's climate resiliency efforts.

== History ==
For much of the 19th and 20th century, Manhattan's waterfront served as a major center for economic activity, supporting trade, shipping, and commerce. The natural harbor provided access to island waterways as well as transatlantic and coastal shipping routes. In the beginning, the city focused on infrastructure that supported the need to move goods and people between ships and shore.

For the first 250 years, the city permitted people to build and operate piers for their private interest and profits. After 1870, the city took back the waterfront, reconstructed docks to accommodate for steamships and railroad freight yards. The extreme congestion of the port during World War I led to the creation of the Port of New York Authority, now called Port Authority of New York and New Jersey which became responsible for managing the harbor from 1921 onwards. Although shipping declined during the 1930s, it was revived during World War II. Significant changes occurred when the Port Authority began the development of a container port in the Newark Bay in the late 1950s.

Shipping soon stopped, piers collapsed, and the waterfront became unused. This coincided with the city declining, losing industries, jobs, revenue, and population, and undergoing racial change. In the late 20th century, particularly after the 1990s, the city revived and the waterfront went through substantial redevelopment. Former industrial areas were repurposed for public and private use like parks, recreational spaces, and residential areas, supported by public initiatives and public authorities.

== Components ==
=== Hudson River Greenway ===
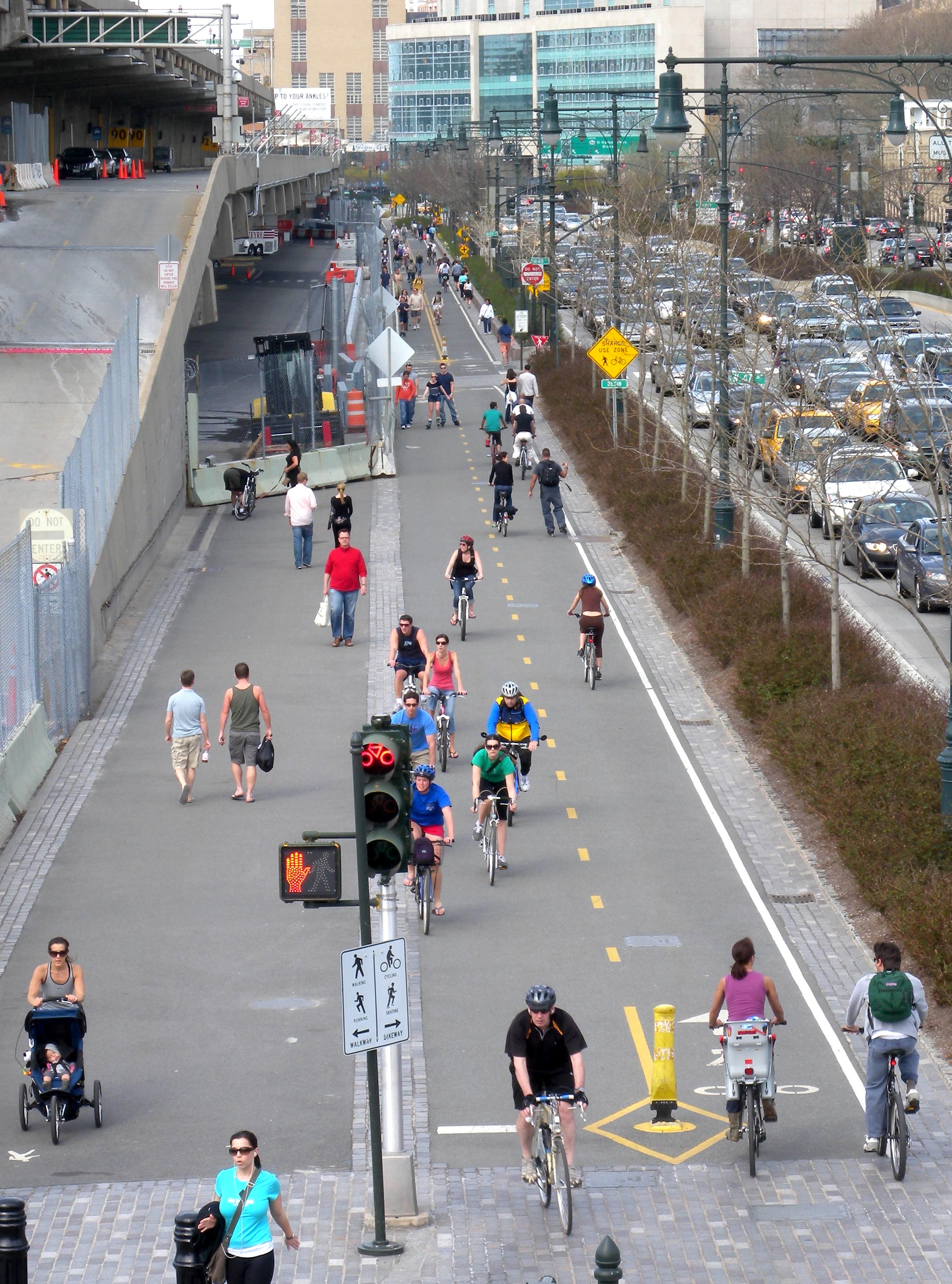
Hudson River Waterfront Walkway near the Manhattan Cruise Terminal

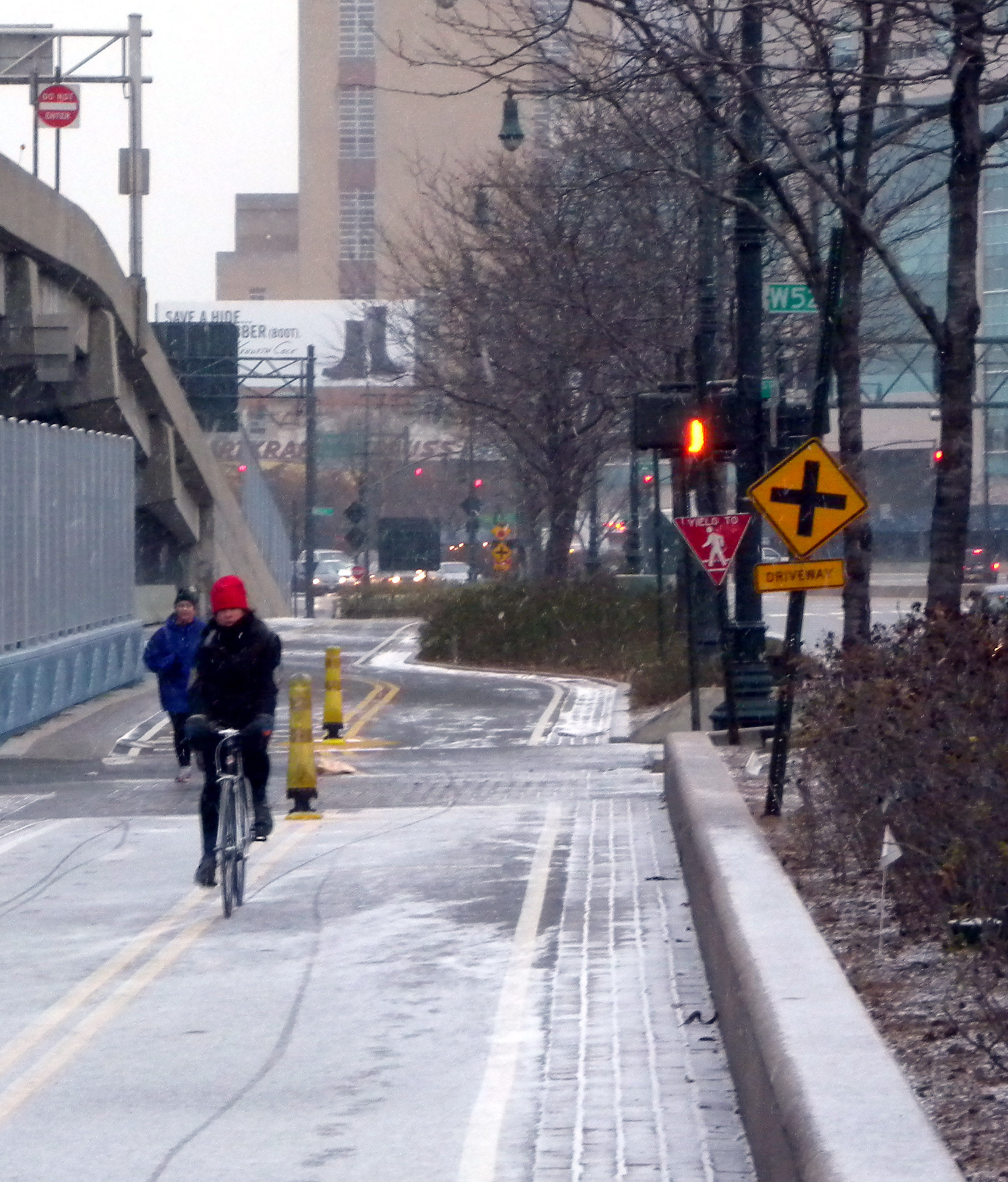
A less busy Manhattan Waterfront Greenway in the snow

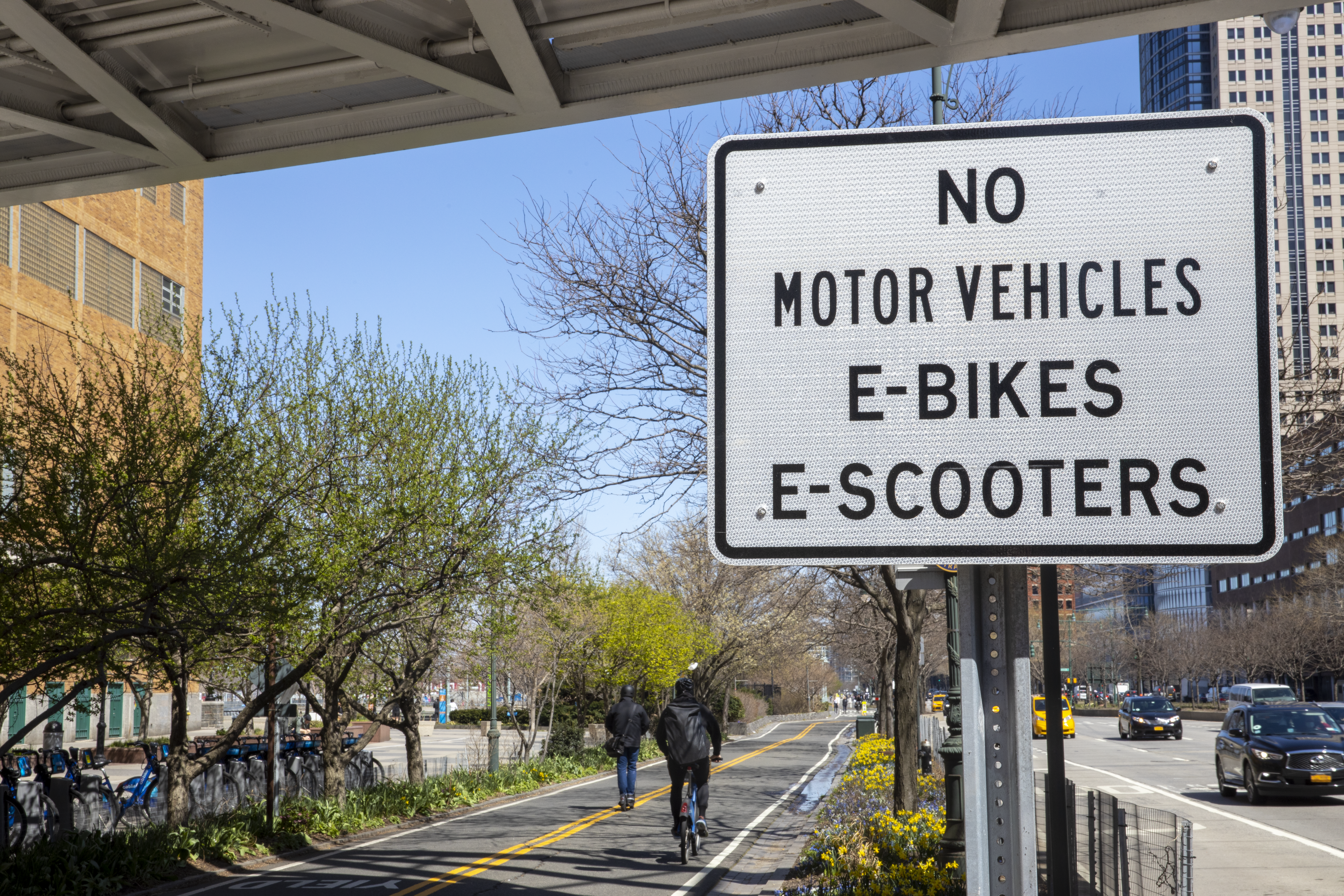
A sign on the Hudson River Greenway in New York City

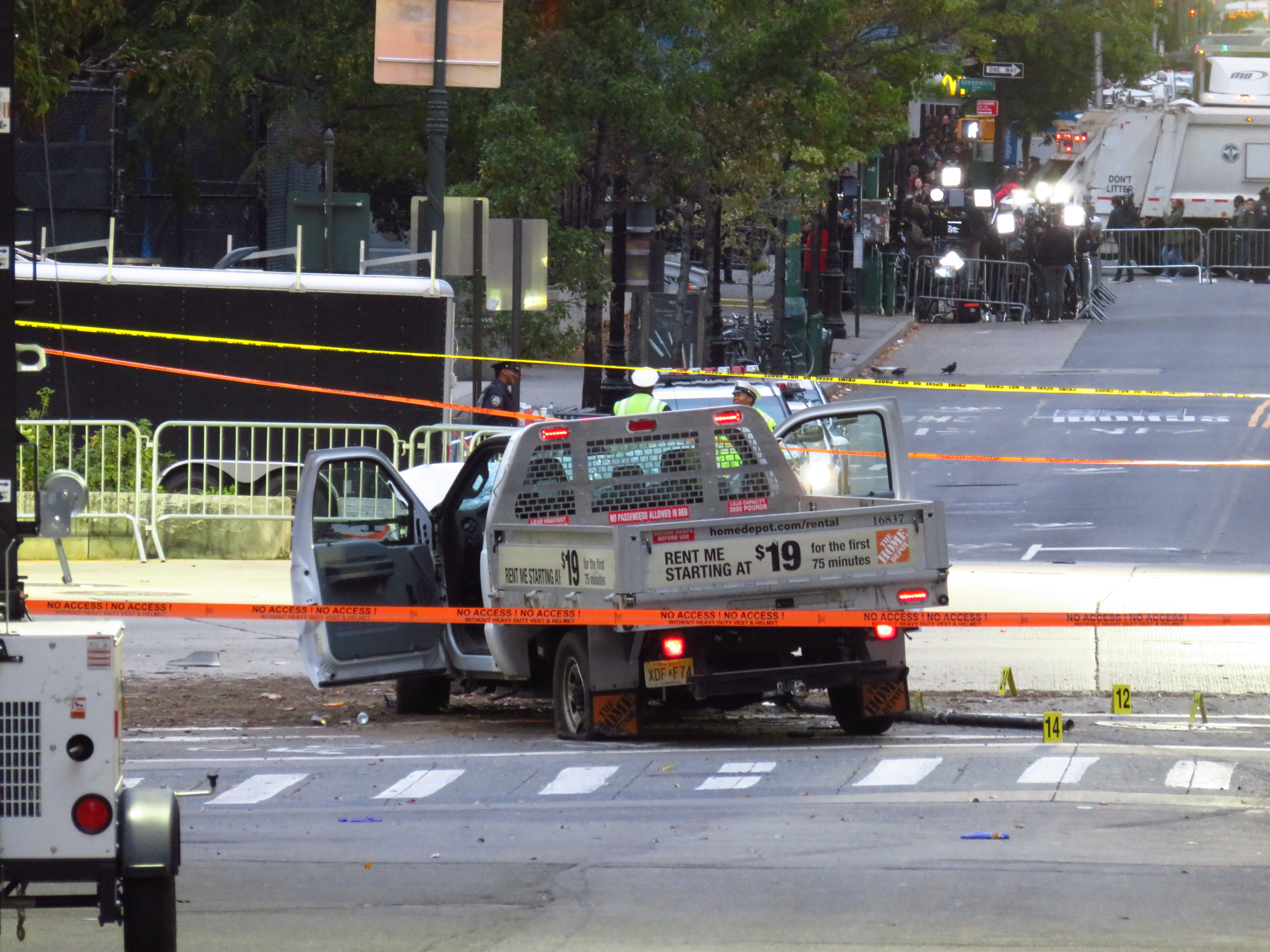
The scene following the 2017 New York City terrorist truck attack on the Greenway

The Hudson River Greenway is the longest greenway in Manhattan, running along the West Side, from Battery Park in the south – mostly through Hudson River Park, Riverside Park, and Fort Washington Park – to Dyckman Street in the north.

A gap in West Harlem was filled in early October 2008 with the opening of the Harlem Piers bike lane. A roughly 10-block detour in the west 80s, where a walkway had crumbled into the river in the late 20th century, was eliminated on May 20, 2010, when the rebuilt section of greenway was opened.

The Hudson River Greenway is the most heavily used bikeway in the United States. The majority of it is close to Hudson River water level, except the portion north of George Washington Bridge where it climbs steeply, to approximately 160 feet (49 m) and includes Inspiration Point, with views of The Palisades in New Jersey across the river and of the George Washington Bridge to the south. The Hudson River Greenway is part of the East Coast Greenway, a 3,000-mile (4,800 km) trail system connecting Maine to Florida, and is also part of the statewide Empire State Trail, forming its southernmost portion.

At the downtown end, the Battery Bikeway connects the Hudson and East River Greenways via the Battery and Peter Minuit Plaza. It opened in 2015 after renovation work on the South Ferry/Whitehall Street station. The connection is a biker crossing right of way across Battery Place to the foot of the Hudson River Greenway. At the Battery's southeast end, the bikeway continues as the East River Greenway, which runs next to FDR Drive.

Travelers to Brooklyn use a bike lane in Warren Street and a one-way bike path (opened in September 2008) through the north end of City Hall Park to connect to the Brooklyn Bridge. Those arriving from Brooklyn use lanes in Park Row and Murray Street to reach the Greenway.

Mixed-use paths continue a mile north from Dyckman Street into Inwood Hill Park alongside the western ball fields, at which point the path crosses the Amtrak rail tracks using a bridge with steps. This continues northeast into the park as part of the park trail system and connects north to bikeways in Spuyten Duyvil in the Bronx via the Henry Hudson Bridge, and east to the bike lane on 218th Street leading to the Broadway Bridge.

The Harbor Ring is an initiative to create a 50-mile (80 km) bike route along the Lower Hudson River, Upper New York Bay, and Kill van Kull that would incorporate bike paths along the Greenway.

A portion of the Greenway between west 72nd and 83rd Streets is devoted to just pedestrians and the bike path was redirected onto other paths, including part of the roundabout above the 79th Street Boat Basin.

In an attack on the Greenway on October 31, 2017, the perpetrator an Uzbek-American drove a rented Home Depot pickup truck into cyclists and runners, killing eight people, six tourist and two locals, and injuring thirteen others.

=== East River Greenway ===
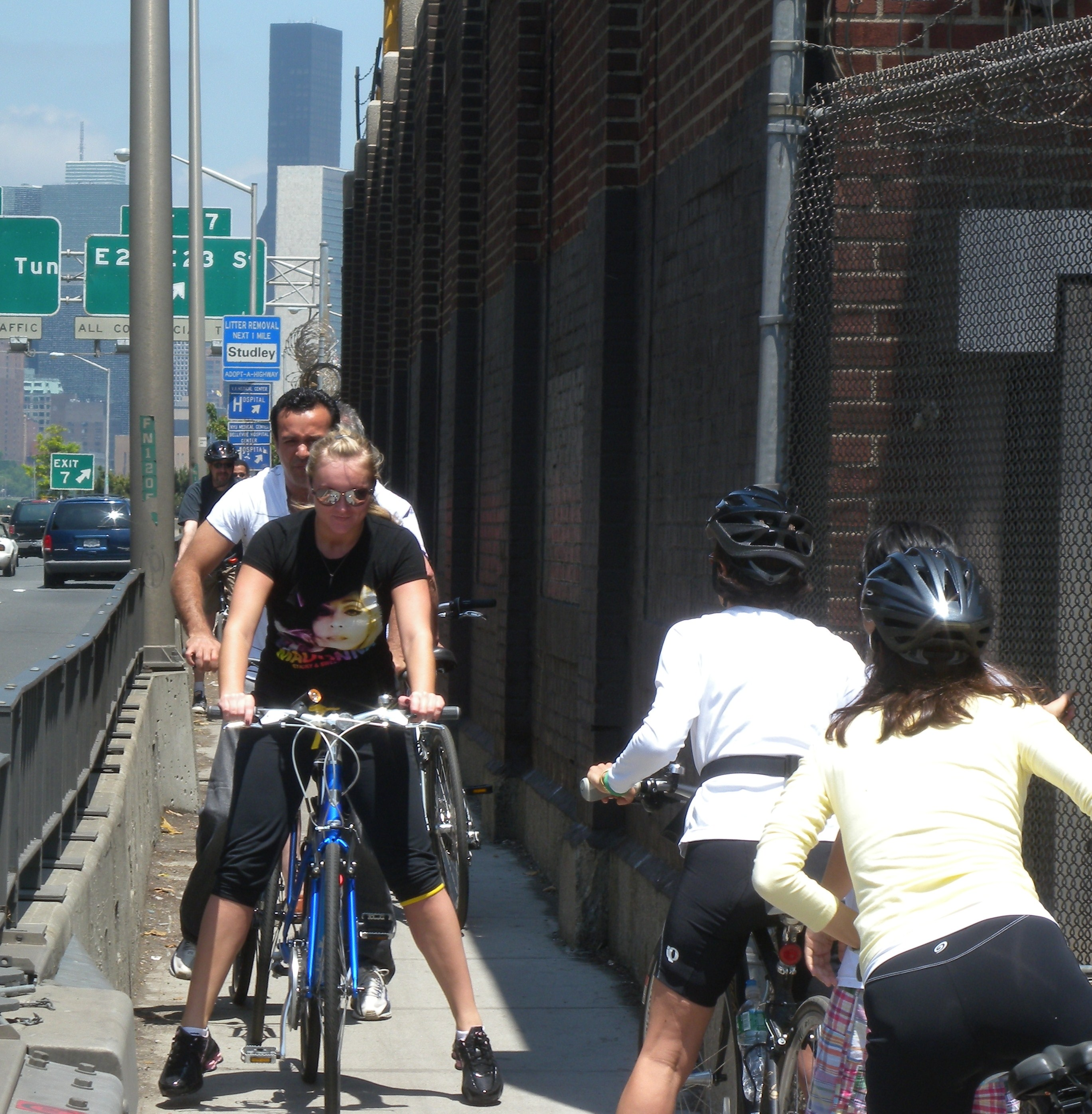
The narrowest part of the East River Greenway in the East Village

The East River Greenway runs along the East Side, from Battery Park and past South Street Seaport to a dead end at 125th Street, East Harlem with a 0.6-mile (0.97 km) gap from 41st to 53rd streets in Midtown where pedestrians and cyclists use busy First and Second Avenues to get around United Nations Headquarters between the Turtle Bay and Kips Bay portions of the Greenway.

Some places are narrow due to sinkholes being blocked off by protective fencing, and the Captain Patrick J. Brown Walk squeezes between the highway and the dock of Con Edison's East River Generating Station, requiring slower speeds. Other parts are shared space with motor access to Waterside Plaza or a filling station near Stuyvesant Cove Park. Approximately a mile near the southwest end is in the shadow of the elevated FDR Drive. This part is to be improved by the East River Esplanade project.

In the summer of 2008 the East River Greenway, along with the Brooklyn Heights Promenade, provided viewing locations to see the New York City Waterfalls.

In August 2024, the New York City Economic Development Corporation announced plans to complete the segment of the greenway between 41st and 53rd streets; the extension would cost $120 million and open in 2028.

=== Harlem River Greenway ===
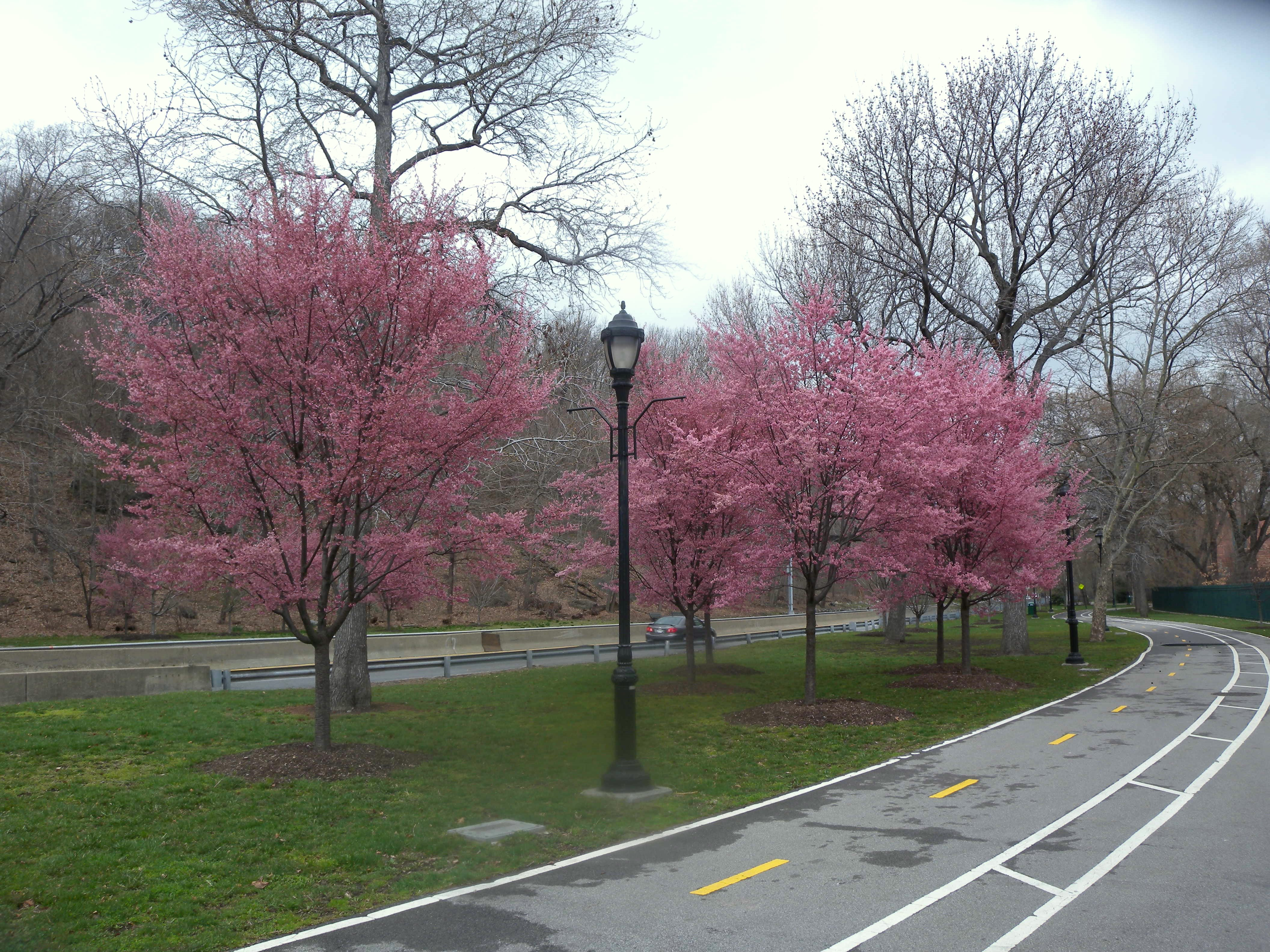
Harlem River Greenway

Partially following the route of the old Harlem River Speedway, the Harlem River Greenway is the shortest portion of the Manhattan Waterfront Greenway and is completely uninterrupted, running north through lower Highbridge Park from 155th Street, at the north end of Harlem, to Dyckman Street in northern Manhattan. It lies between the Harlem River and Harlem River Drive. Users of the East River Greenway must use ordinary streets through East Harlem to reach this portion. A bike lane in Dyckman Street through Inwood connects to Inwood Hill Park and the Hudson River Greenway via a 2015 bike ramp at the western end of Dyckman Street.

A second, shorter Harlem River Greenway is in Harlem River Park, running from about 133rd Street in the south to 145th Street in the north. Access to the greenway is via walkways at 135th, 139th, and 142nd streets. The city has proposed to extend Harlem River Park south to 125th Street, where the greenway could connect to the East River Greenway; also to extend Harlem River Greenway north, into the Bronx.

== Economic Impacts ==
The Manhattan Waterfront Greenway, particularly the Hudson River Park Section, has significantly contributed to the economic development of part of Manhattan. It has increased local real estate values, tourism and business investment, promoting the Manhattan Waterfront area.

For property value and neighborhood development: The Benefits of Hudson River Park found that investments in Hudson River Park generate numerous economic returns for New York city. Building on an earlier 2008 study shows the park’s influence on property values, employment, tourism development and property taxes along Manhattan’s far west side/ The report noted that the park helped transform those old factories into a valuable area for investing.

=== Development and revitalization ===
As derelict buildings were cleared and the West Side Highway was rebuilt at ground level, the inland properties became more desirable. A pair of condominium towers designed by Richard Meier at Perry Street in the West Village was one of the first signs of change. Developers have spent billions of dollars transforming neighborhoods along the park, attracting companies such as IAV, a digital media firm, and Google to new towers facing the river. Hudson River Park draws 17 million visits a year. Recent projects have continued to expand the park’s amenities.

==== Projects ====
1. Gansevoort Peninsula, which is a 5½-acre recreational area that includes a public beach, opened as part of $73 million overhaul.
2. Little Island at Pier 55, a mini park resting on tulip-shaped concrete pots, was founded by a foundation started by Barry Diller and fashion designer Diane von Furstenberg.
3. Pier 57, an engineering marvel from the 1950s at West 15th Street on the National Register of Historic Places, has been renovated to include a food hall and Google office. The park and inland real estate became further entwined when the sale of unused developments right from commercial piers was allowed, enabling additional floors to be added to buildings such as the 1934 freight terminal converted into Google offices.
4. Pier 97, a $47 million project off 57th Street, added a large playground.

=== Result ===
==== Property value ====
For property value and neighborhood development: The Benefits of Hudson River Park found that investments in Hudson River Park generate numerous economic returns for New York city. Building on an earlier 2008 study shows the park’s influence on property values, employment, tourism development and property taxes along Manhattan’s far west side/ The report noted that the park helped transform those old factories into a valuable area for investing.

==== Tourism development ====
For tourism and recreation The Economics Benefits of Parks in New York city, the city’ s park system generates almost $18 billion in tourism spending annually. The report also found that New York City parks provide $9.1b billion in recreational value and that residents visit parks more than 527 million times per year. Today, the Hudson River Greenway portion has already been rated as the busiest bikeway in America.

==== Commercial development ====
Development projects along the greenway have contributed to the local economy a lot. In January 2026, Sunset pier 94 Studios opened as Manhattan’s first purpose built film and television production facility. The $350 million project, a public private partnership between Coronado production facility.This project creates approximately 400 permanent jobs and contributes an estimated $6.4 billion to the local economy over 30 years. The project also included improvements to the adjacent bikeway and new public access to the waterfront.

== Storm barrier ==
There are plans for a storm barrier along the southern third of the greenway, from West 57th St. down to the Battery, and back up to East 42nd St. As of April 2021, parts of this plan have been implemented along the East River Greenway.

The final proposal, which is geographically U-shaped, will include many features. Under the elevated FDR Drive structure above South Street will be storm barriers hanging from the viaduct's ceiling, which will drop down in case of a storm. A "Battery Berm" will be located at Battery Park, and a maritime museum will be opened on the site of a former Coast Guard building there. The proposal, by Rebuild by Design, will also include components for storm barriers in Hunts Point, Bronx and on Staten Island.

The first component, a 2.19-mile-long (4 km) barrier on the Lower East Side between Montgomery and East 13th Streets called "The Bridging Berm", will cost $335 million. In addition to storm protection, the berm—the first of three of the barrier's components—will also provide a pedestrian pathway and bikeway on top of berm, boating and fishing docks, a slope down to current sports fields, upgraded ADA-accessible ramps for bridges across the FDR Drive, and construction materials such as "slurry walls, concrete blocks, a compacted embankment, a clay cap, topsoil and salt-tolerant landscaping." The berm bikeway will make a second connection between the Hudson and East River Greenways (the first being the Battery Bikeway). The total cost of the project is over $3.5 billion.

In March 2019, then New York City mayor Bill de Blasio announced a Lower Manhattan Coastal Resiliency Plan, which would create barriers and possibly extend the shoreline at a cost of $10 billion. At the time, four of the project's phases had funding and were set to start construction between 2020 and 2021. The projects include berms as well as retractable dams and barriers in Battery Park City, the Financial District, and Two Bridges. In 2019, the city installed a temporary barrier while the permanent barrier is being erected.

== See also ==
- Cycling in New York City
- Brooklyn–Queens Greenway
- Greenway (landscape)
