= Cy A Adler =

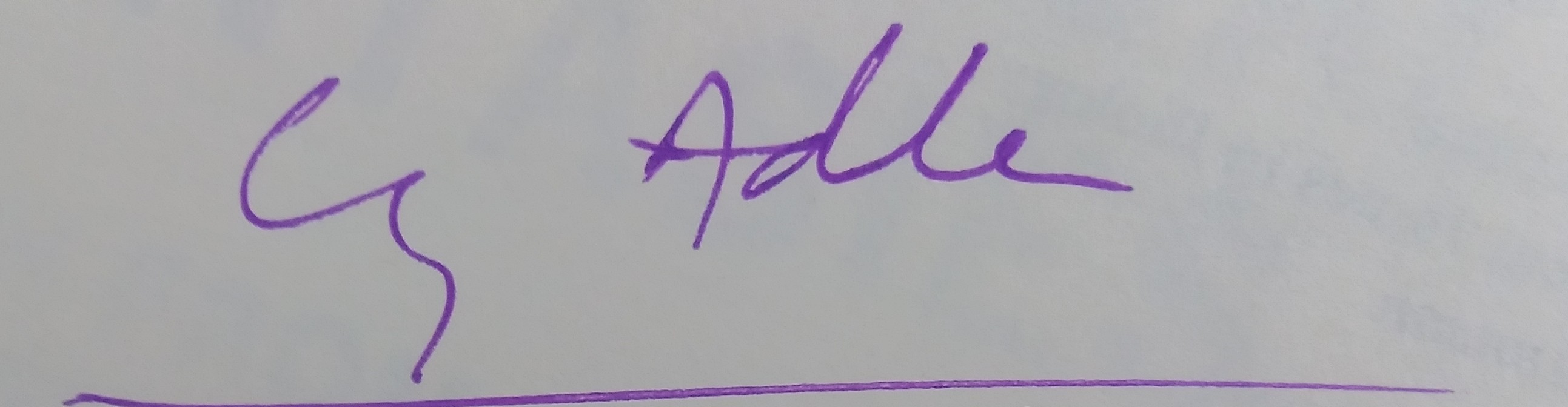
Cy A. Adler's signature

Cy A Adler (b. Cyrus Adler, Brooklyn, New York, 1927 – September 27, 2018) was an author, organizer and conservationist, known for his work over the course of several decades in raising awareness for shoreline issues in and around New York City, United States.

He was especially known for his early work on the initiative that would result in the creation of The Great Saunter, an annual walk which goes through Hudson River Park, Riverside Park, East River Park, and some 20 other parks around the island of Manhattan. For his efforts to see to completion a park stretching almost the entire circumference of the Hudson River shore of the island of Manhattan, Adler was recognized by mayors of New York City including Bill de Blasio and Michael Bloomberg, and borough presidents of Manhattan including Scott Stringer, Ruth Messinger, and Gale Brewer, as well New York City Parks Commissioner Adrian Benepe, and former US Senator Hillary Clinton.

== Career ==
Trained as a mathematician and oceanographer, Adler taught physics at the City College of New York and oceanography at SUNY Maritime and Long Island University. He contributed to several scholarly publications in his field in the 1960s and 1970s, but his environmental advocacy work began in earnest after the 1973 publication of his first book, Ecological Fantasies - Death From Falling Watermelons: A Defense of Innovation, Science, and Rational Approaches to Environmental Problems, which had grown out of a series of somewhat contentious debates on environmental policy published in Science and The Village Voice in 1972. By the late 1970s, Adler's articles on shoreline issues had appeared in The Village Voice, as well as other local papers including The New York Times and Newsday. His science-based letters and articles appeared in the American Journal of Physics (January 1958), Undersea Technology (August 1968), Journal of Ocean Technology V.2 No.1 (1967), Science and Technology (October 1969), The Wall Street Journal (February 1971), Marine Engineering Log (March 1971), American Fish Farmer (August 1972), and Science (November 1972).

In early December 1982, Adler placed an ad in the Voice announcing a public walk along the Hudson River from Battery Park to Riverside Park, which at the time consisted largely of docking facilities abandoned due to containerization. The walk, which served to raise awareness of the disused and inaccessible shoreline, became an annual event known as The Great Saunter, eventually constituting a complete shoreline circumnavigation of the island of Manhattan. This walk developed into a non-profit group, Shorewalkers. Established in 198,2 the organization was incorporated in 1984. Adler was president of Shorewalkers until October 2017, when he resigned to devote more time to his civic, literary and municipal projects.

In 1984, Adler wrote an article published in The New York Times, advocating a public shoreline path from the river's mouth at Battery Park to the river's source, Lake Tear of the Clouds in the Adirondack Mountains. Adler's book Walking The Hudson, Batt to Bear (From the Battery to Bear Mountain) detailed the route, as of 1997, as far as Bear Mountain. A second edition published by W. W. Norton & Company updated the route for 2012. The book contains an introduction by folk singer Pete Seeger, a member of Shorewalkers and friend of Adler.

Adler organized several New York state corporations. In 1972, he organized and was CEO of Offshore Sea Development Corp. He and his associates developed systems for offloading oil tankers and bi-valve aquaculture techniques. He earned several patents, including one for a single-point mooring, U.S. patent number 3.756.293.

Under various pseudonyms, Adler wrote and produced several other works. One of these was Wholly Mother Jones, a play with music about the extraordinary labor organizer, Mary Harris Jones. It has been produced at least three times at the Brecht Forum and the People's Voice Cafe. Another book was The Queer Dutchman - Castaway on Ascension, which went through two editions at Greeneagle Press. He also wrote Crazy to go to Sea, a memoir of his time working in the Norwegian Merchant Marine in the 1950s.

With Pete Seeger, Adler wrote the lyrics to several songs, including "Hurrah, Hurray for the NRA," a song related to gun violence, and the Shorewalkers Saunter song. He also developed the album No Job, No Bread? Sing a Jolly Song!

His humanist cantata "The Turtles Mass" premiered on Earth Day, 22 April 2018.
