= Little Red Lighthouse =

Lighthouse in Manhattan, New York

Jeffrey's Hook Light Little Red Lighthouse
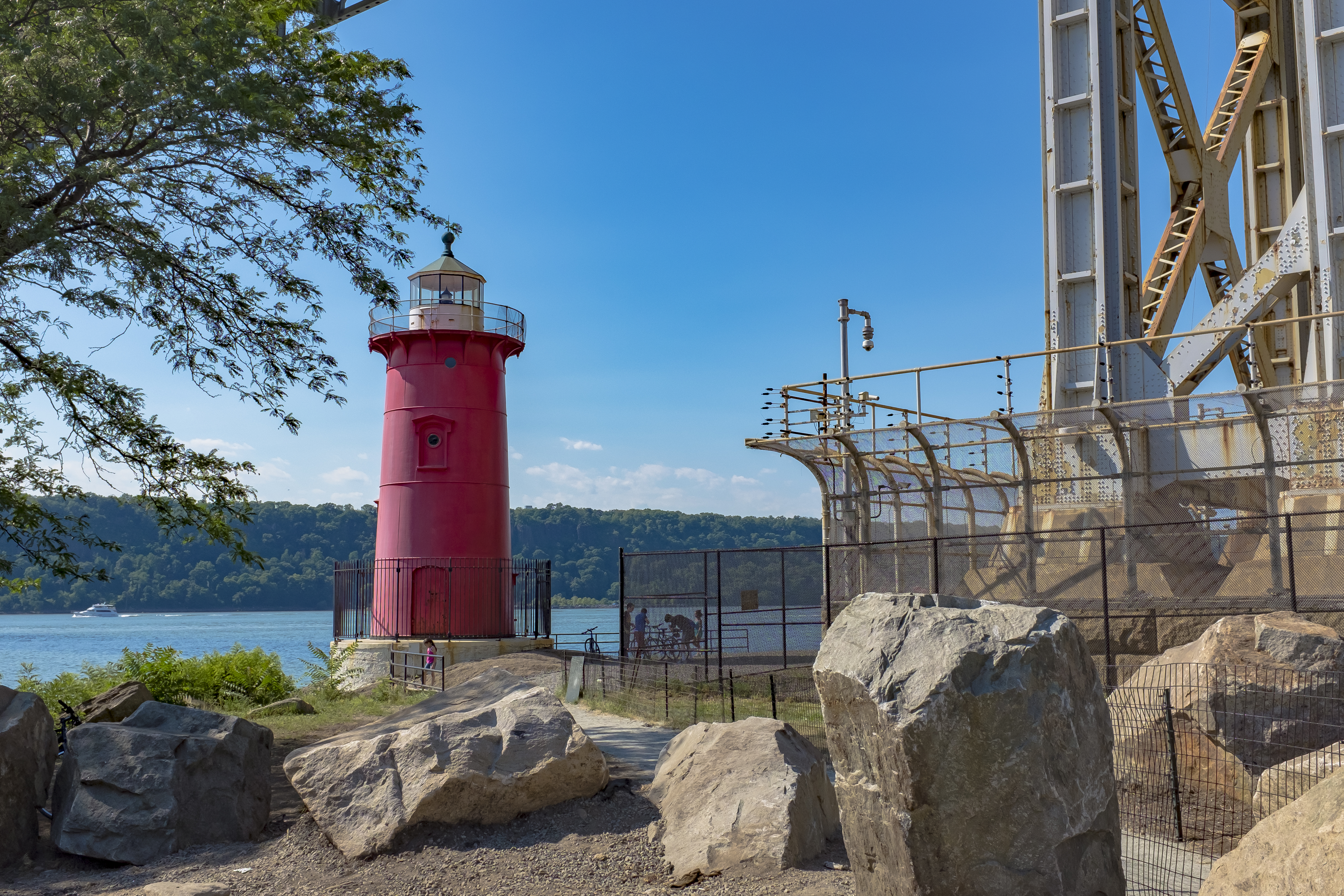
- Location: Fort Washington Park, Manhattan, United States
- Coordinates: 40°51′01″N 73°56′49″W

Tower
- Constructed: 1921
- Construction: concrete (foundation), cast iron (tower)
- Height: 40 ft (12 m)
- Shape: conical
- Markings: Red (tower), white (lantern)
- Heritage: New York City Landmark, National Register of Historic Places listed place

Light
- First lit: 1921
- Deactivated: 1947–2002
- Lens: 12 inches (300 mm)
- Characteristic: Fl R 3s
- Jeffrey's Hook Lighthouse
- U.S. National Register of Historic Places
- New York State Register of Historic Places
- New York City Landmark
- Built: 1920
- MPS: Hudson River Lighthouses TR
- NRHP reference No.: 79003130
- NYSRHP No.: 06101.000552
- NYCL No.: 1654

Significant dates
- Added to NRHP: May 29, 1979
- Designated NYSRHP: June 23, 1980
- Designated NYCL: May 14, 1991

The Little Red Lighthouse, officially Jeffrey's Hook Light, is a small lighthouse located in Fort Washington Park along the Hudson River in Manhattan, New York City, under the George Washington Bridge. It was made notable by the 1942 children's book The Little Red Lighthouse and The Great Gray Bridge, written by Hildegarde Swift and illustrated by Lynd Ward.

The lighthouse stands on Jeffrey's Hook, a small point of land that supports the base of the eastern pier of the bridge, which connects Washington Heights in Manhattan to Fort Lee, New Jersey.

== History ==
The first attempt to reduce Hudson River traffic accidents at Jeffrey's Hook was a red pole, hung out over the river. A ten candle-power light was added to the pole in 1889 to help alert the increasing river traffic to the spit of land at night. The land around Jeffrey's Hook was acquired by the city in 1896 and later became Fort Washington Park.

The early structure was built as the North Hook Beacon at Sandy Hook, New Jersey. It stood there until 1917, when it became obsolete. In 1921, it was reconstructed at its current location by the United States Lighthouse Board as part of a project to improve Hudson River navigational aids, and originally had a battery-powered lamp and a fog bell. It was operated by a part-time lighthouse keeper.

Construction on the George Washington Bridge, immediately above the lighthouse, began in 1927. When the bridge was completed in 1931, the lighthouse navigational light was considered obsolete. In 1948, the Coast Guard decommissioned the light and put it out with the intention of auctioning it off. This proposed dismantling resulted in a public outcry, largely from children who were fans of the 1942 children's book The Little Red Lighthouse and the Great Gray Bridge. This led the Coast Guard to sign its deed to the New York City Department of Parks and Recreation on July 23, 1951.

The lighthouse was listed on the National Register of Historic Places as "Jeffrey's Hook Lighthouse" in 1979, and was designated a New York City Landmark in 1991. In 2002, it was relit by the city. In 2026, the Historic House Trust of New York City announced that it would spend $13 million renovating the lighthouse.

== Access ==
Little Red Lighthouse Festival in October

Public access to the lighthouse is by the Hudson River Greenway, reachable to the north by a footbridge across the Henry Hudson Parkway at West 182nd Street and Riverside Drive, and to the south by footbridges at West 158th Street or 151st Street.

Tours of the lighthouse are given infrequently. They are arranged by the Parks Department's Urban Park Rangers, especially on the Little Red Lighthouse Festival day in late September and Open House New York day in October. The October Little Red Lighthouse Festivals in 2018 and 2019 were run by the organization Summer on the Hudson in conjunction with the Riverside Park Conservancy and the New York City Department of Parks and Recreation. The festival was not held in 2020 or 2021 due to the COVID-19 pandemic, but it resumed in 2022.

== In other media ==
The lighthouse is an important setting in the final scenes for the 1948 film Force of Evil, and Jane Campion's neo-noir film In the Cut features the lighthouse as motif and as a filming location. It is also featured in the final scenes of the 2026 film One Night Only.

== See also ==
- List of New York City Designated Landmarks in Manhattan above 110th Street
- National Register of Historic Places listings in Manhattan above 110th Street
