= The Great Saunter =

Annual walk in Manhattan

Coordinates: 40.706111°N 74.003333°W

The Great Saunter is a day-long hike along Manhattan's 32-mile shoreline, visiting more than 20 parks and promenades. Manhattan's waterfront rim has evolved since Shorewalkers Inc, a nonprofit environmental and walking group, began advocating for a public shoreline walkway in 1982. Now the path is nearly contiguous. The Saunter takes place on the first Saturday in May, recognized by the New York City Council as "The Great Saunter Day".

The Great Saunter has received support from numerous elected officials as well as folk singer Pete Seeger, who co-wrote the "Shorewalkers' Saunter Song".

The walk originally started at the South Street Seaport, but the area was damaged during Hurricane Sandy in 2012. The Great Saunter now starts and finishes at Fraunces Tavern.

In 2018, about 1700 people participated in the Great Saunter and by 2026, participants totaled 3000-a growth that did not come without challenges. Approximately half of the participants are locals and the balance travel for the event.

The Great Saunter was first explored and walked by Shorewalkers founder Cy A. Adler in 1982 or 1984. Adler wrote a book about this called Walking Manhattan’s Rim, the Great Saunter, published by Green Eagle Press. In 1984, the first walk had only a few people who had to climb fences and go through holes along the deteriorating waterfront which had lost much of its shipping due to the Container Revolution.

== See also ==
- Triple Crown of Open Water Swimming
