= Inspiration Point (Hudson River Greenway) =

Structure in Manhattan, New York

Coordinates: 40.858604°N 73.937345°W

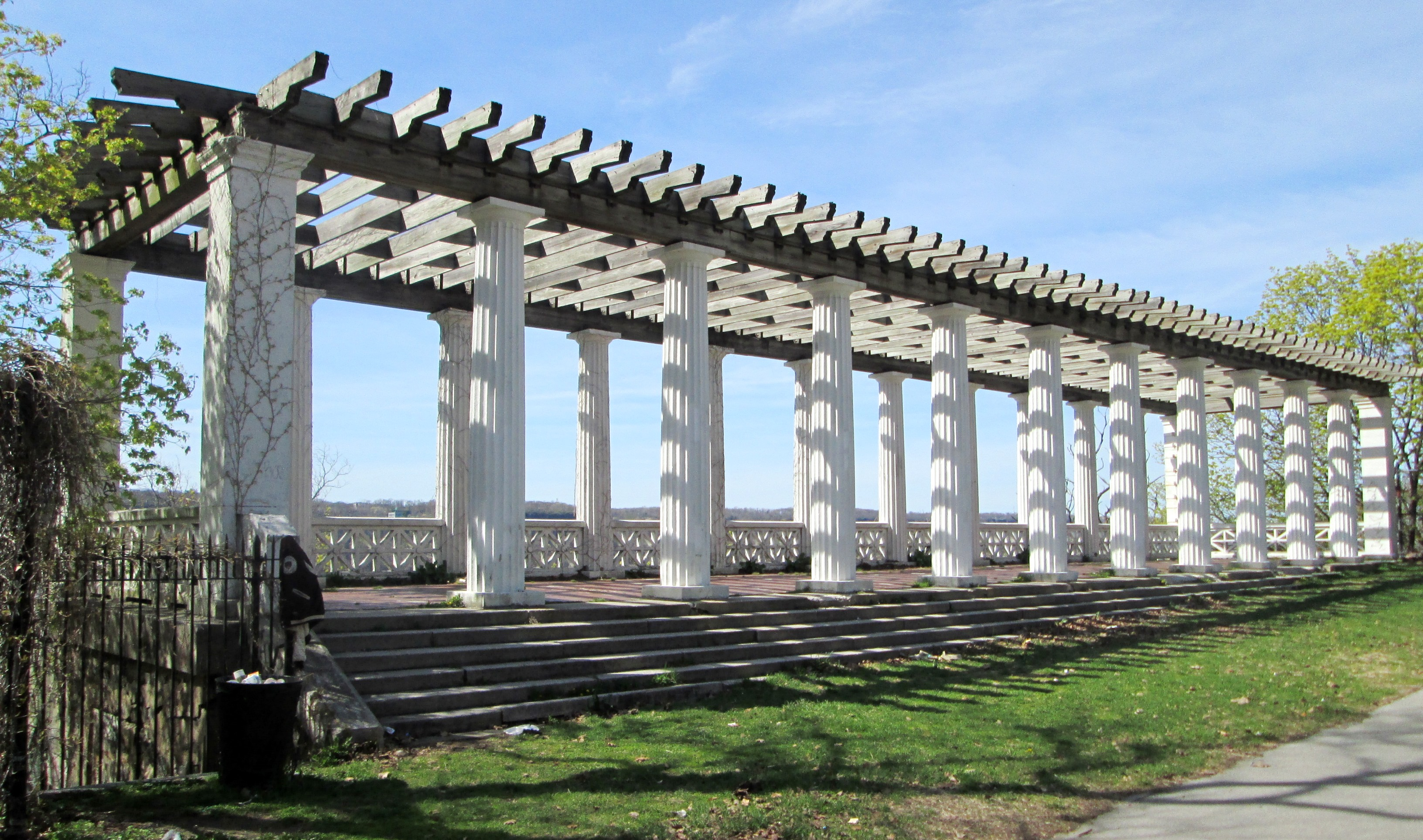
View from the south

The Inspiration Point Shelter is a popular rest stop for cyclists along the Hudson River Greenway within Fort Washington Park in Manhattan, which extends to Inwood Hill Park to the north and Riverside Park to the south. The Inspiration Point Shelter provides mostly unobstructed views of the Palisades across the river and of the George Washington Bridge to the south.

== History ==
The New York City Department of Parks and Recreation website says that "Inspiration Point Shelter opened in 1925 as a resting place for pedestrians and leisure drivers on the Henry Hudson Parkway. Designed by architect Gustave Steinacher in 1924, the neoclassical sitting area opened a year later and quickly became a favorite of Hudson River tourists." The sitting area originally consisted of two levels, the upper, open air covered structure, and a lower level containing restrooms for pedestrians and motorists. The lower level was accessible via stairs on either side of the shelter.

After the Henry Hudson Parkway was built in the 1930s, the area around the shelter changed from a place for pleasure drives to a through-way, and the structure was cut off from the rest of Manhattan and fell into disuse. In 1989, Christopher Gray featured the shelter in his book Changing New York: The Architectural Scene.

Increased traffic turned what had been a walking/driving experience into a no-man’s land for pedestrians. The walkway is now overgrown…and the shelter itself now suggests despair…whole sections have fallen off or hang precariously at the edge. Water damage has buckled the elegant coffered ceiling and most of what remains looks like driftwood scavenged from a lost civilization.

The city restored the shelter soon after Gray's book was published, and made some minor structural changes. The bathrooms and the roof were permanently done away with. Now, only the street level of the shelter is accessible to the public.

The pull-off from the Henry Hudson Parkway was barricaded and the shelter is now only accessible from the Henry Hudson Greenway which may be entered from the footbridge at 181st Street or the underpass at Riverside Drive and Dyckman Street. The retaining walls along the Greenway adjacent to Inspiration Point show signs of deterioration and vandalism.
