= Inspiration Point (Yellowstone) =

Promontory cliff

Inspiration Point Promontory Point
- Cliff
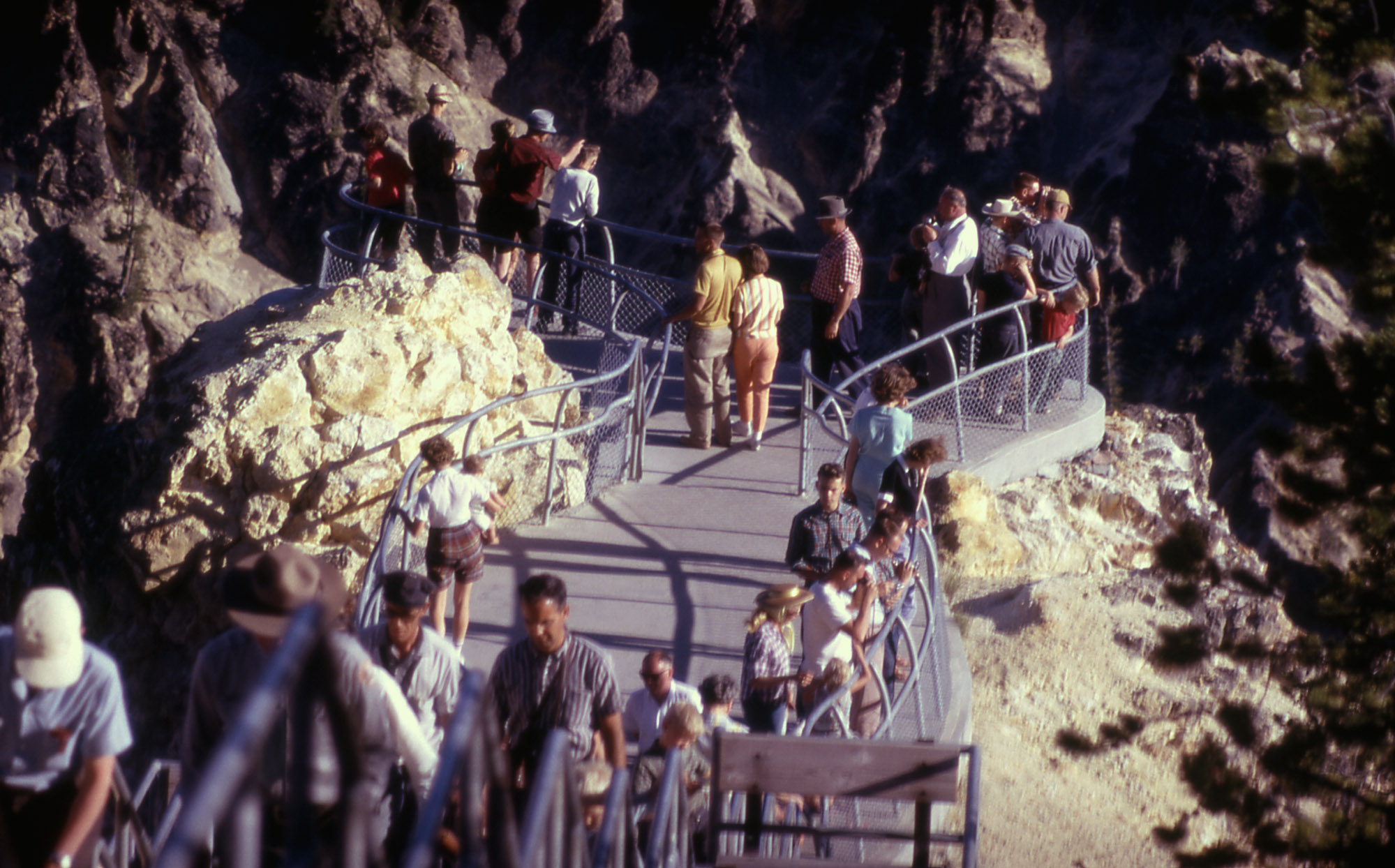
- Inspiration Point viewing platform

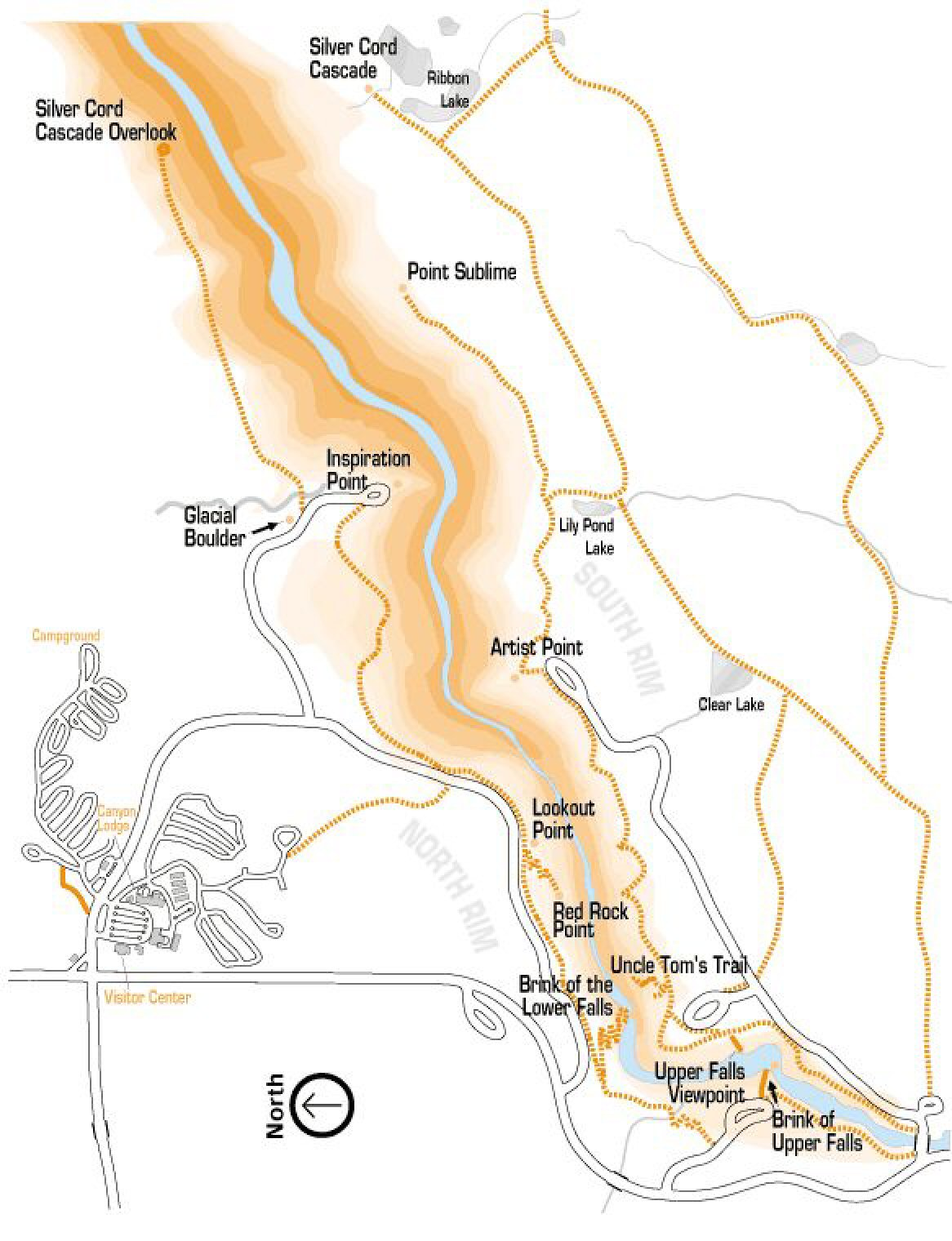
- Coordinates: 44°43′31″N 110°28′13″W
- Location: Yellowstone National Park, Park County, Wyoming, United States

Inspiration Point is a promontory cliff on the north rim of the Grand Canyon of the Yellowstone east of Yellowstone Falls on the Yellowstone River in Yellowstone National Park. The point was originally named Promontory Point in 1878 by W. H. Holmes but later given the name of Inspiration Point by G. L. Henderson, a park concessionaire in 1887. The point is a natural observation point over the rim of the Grand Canyon of the Yellowstone.
