= Washington Heights, Manhattan =

Neighborhood in New York City

Washington Heights
- Neighborhood of Manhattan
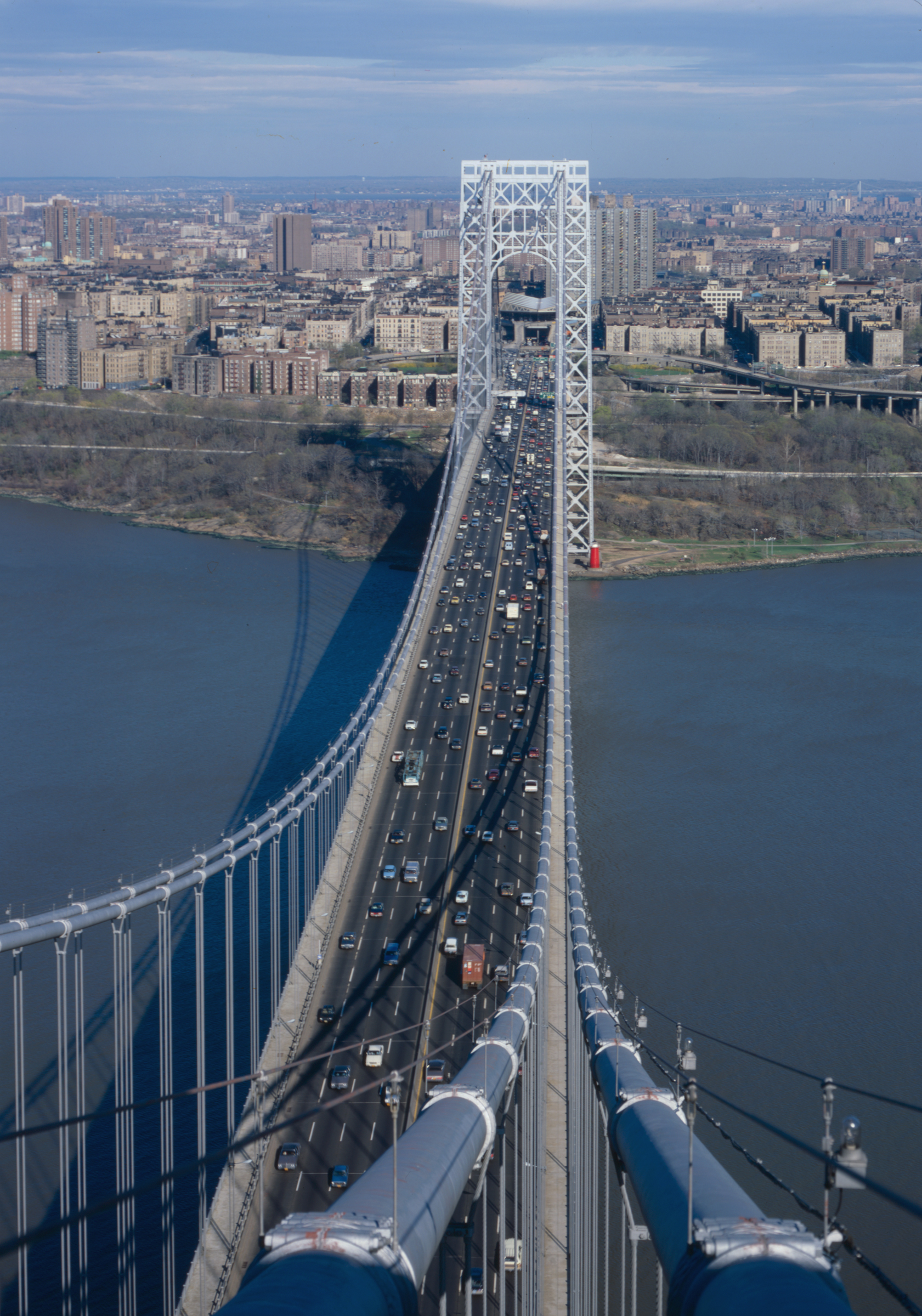
- The George Washington Bridge, the world's busiest motor vehicle bridge, crossing the Hudson River with Washington Heights in the background (April 1986)
- Nickname: The Heights
- Location of Washington Heights in New York City
- Coordinates: 40.84°N 73.94°W
- Country: United States
- State: New York
- City: New York City
- Borough: Manhattan
- Community District: Manhattan 12

Area
  - Total: 1.655 sq mi (4.29 km^{2})

Population (2020)
  - Total: 151,574
  - Density: 91,590/sq mi (35,360/km^{2})

Ethnicity
  - Hispanic: 64.1%
  - White: 21.7
  - Black: 7.5
  - Asian: 3.5
  - Others: 3.2

Economics
  - Median household income: $58,373
- Time zone: UTC−5 (Eastern)
  - Summer (DST): UTC−4 (EDT)
- ZIP Codes: 10032, 10033, 10040
- Area code: 212, 332, 646, and 917

Washington Heights is a neighborhood in the northern part of the borough of Manhattan in New York City. It is named for Fort Washington, a fortification constructed at the highest natural point on Manhattan by Continental Army troops to defend the area from the British forces during the American Revolutionary War. Washington Heights is bordered by Inwood to the north along Dyckman Street, by Harlem to the south along 155th Street, by the Harlem River and Coogan's Bluff to the east, and by the Hudson River to the west.

Washington Heights, which before the 20th century was sparsely populated by luxurious mansions and single-family homes, rapidly developed during the early 1900s as it became connected to the rest of Manhattan via the Broadway–Seventh Avenue and Eighth Avenue lines of the New York City Subway. Beginning as a middle-class neighborhood with many Irish and Eastern European immigrants, the neighborhood has at various points been home to communities of German Jews, Greek Americans, Puerto Ricans, Cuban Americans, African Americans, and Russian Americans.

Throughout the 1960s and 1970s, many white residents left the neighborhood for nearby suburbs as the Latino populations increased. Dominican Americans became the dominant group by the 1980s despite facing economic difficulties, leading the neighborhood to its status in the 21st century as the most prominent Dominican community in the United States. While crime became a serious issue during the crack-cocaine crisis of the 1980s and early 1990s, Washington Heights became a much safer community after the late 1990s and began to experience some upward mobility as well as gentrification.

Washington Heights is set apart among Manhattan neighborhoods for its high residential density despite the lack of modern construction, with the majority of its few high-rise buildings belonging to the NewYork-Presbyterian Hospital/Columbia University Medical Center. Other higher education institutions include Yeshiva University and Boricua College. The neighborhood has generous access to green space in Fort Washington Park, Highbridge Park, and Fort Tryon Park, home to the historical landmarks the Little Red Lighthouse, the High Bridge Water Tower, and the Cloisters, respectively. Other points of interest include Audubon Terrace, the Morris–Jumel Mansion, the United Palace, the Audubon Ballroom, and the Fort Washington Avenue Armory.

Washington Heights is part of Manhattan Community District 12, and its primary ZIP Codes are 10032, 10033, and 10040. It is served by the 33rd and 34th Precincts of the New York City Police Department, Engine Companies 67, 84, and 93, and Ladder Companies 34 and 45 (The Might of the Heights) of the New York City Fire Department. Politically, it is part of the New York City Council's 7th and 10th districts.

== History ==
=== Early history ===
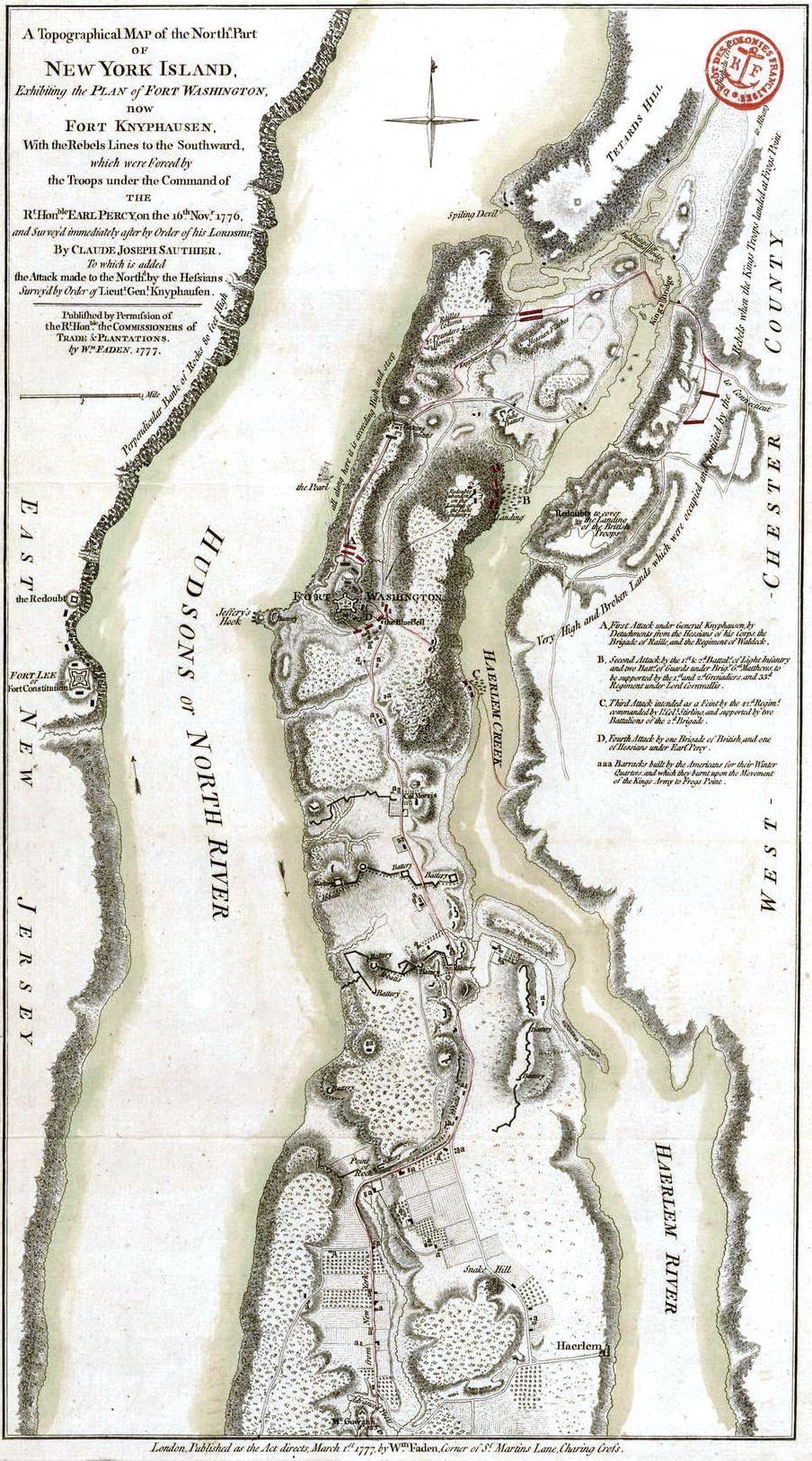
A topographic map of northern Manhattan made by the British in November 1776 following the fall of Fort Washington during the Revolutionary War

Prior to the arrival of Europeans, the area was traversed by American Indians from the Early Woodland Period, who left remains of shellfish and pottery at the site of the present-day Little Red Lighthouse. Washington Heights is part of the section of northern Manhattan that is the homeland of the Wecquaesgeeks (originally a name for the area meaning "birch-bark country"), a band of the Wappinger and a Lenape Native American people. The winding path of Broadway north of 168th Street and St. Nicholas Avenue to its south is living evidence of the old Wecquaesgeek trail which travelled along the Hudson Valley from Lower Manhattan all the way through Albany. On the plateau west of Broadway between 175th and 181st Streets, the residents had been cultivating crops in a field known to Dutch colonists as the "Great Maize Field".

=== 17th century ===
Arriving in 1623, the Dutch initially worked as trade partners with the American Indians but became more and more hostile as time went on, with the natives frequently reciprocating. The Dutch referred to the elevated area of northwestern Washington Heights as "Long Hill," while the Fort Tryon Park area specifically carried the name "Forest Hill".

=== 18th and 19th centuries ===
None of the land in present-day Washington Heights was under private ownership until 1712, when it was parceled out in lots to various landowners from the village of Harlem to the south. Even after repeated attempts by the Dutch to drive them out, including the bloody Kieft's War (1643–1645), some Wecquaesgeek managed to maintain residence in Washington Heights up until the Dutch paid them a settlement for their last land claims in 1715. For the greater part of the next two centuries, Washington Heights would remain a home to wealthy landowners seeking a quiet location for their suburban estates.

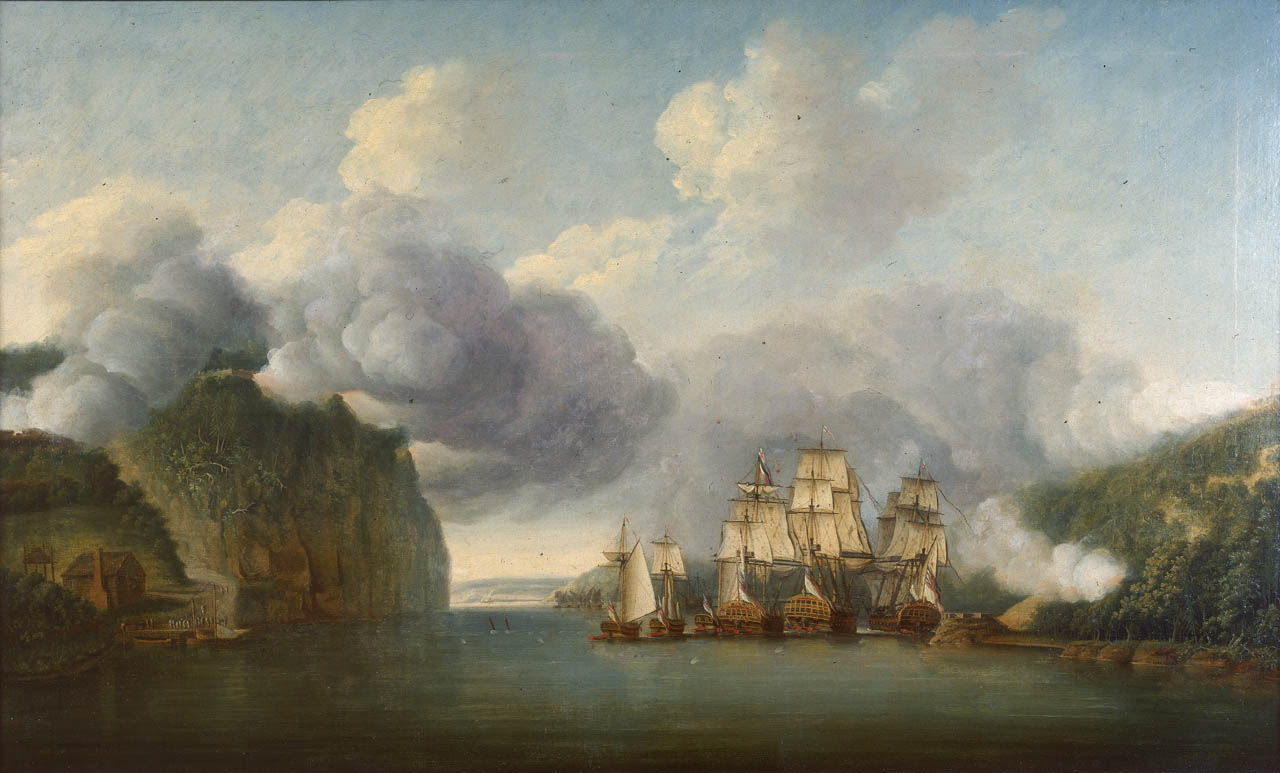
British warships trying to pass between Forts Washington and Lee, 1776.

During the New York Campaign of the Revolutionary War, General George Washington's Continental Army secured a small but much-needed victory over the pursuing British Army at the Battle of Harlem Heights, after having suffered a series of defeats in Manhattan. Not long after their victory, the Continental Army suffered one of its worst defeats at the Battle of Fort Washington, in which nearly 2,900 troops were captured. Fort Washington was a group of fortifications on the high points of Washington Heights, with its central site at present-day Bennett Park (known then as Mount Washington) built a few months prior opposite Fort Lee, New Jersey, to protect the Hudson River from enemy ships.

Under British control, the position was renamed Fort Knyphausen for the Hessian general Wilhelm von Knyphausen, who played a major part in the victory; its lesser fortification at present-day Fort Tryon Park was renamed for Sir William Tryon, the last governor of New York before it was taken back by the Continental Army. The park holds a plaque dedicated in 1909 to Margaret Corbin, an American who took over at her husband's cannon after his death in the Battle of Fort Washington; she was also honored with the naming of Margaret Corbin Drive in 1977.

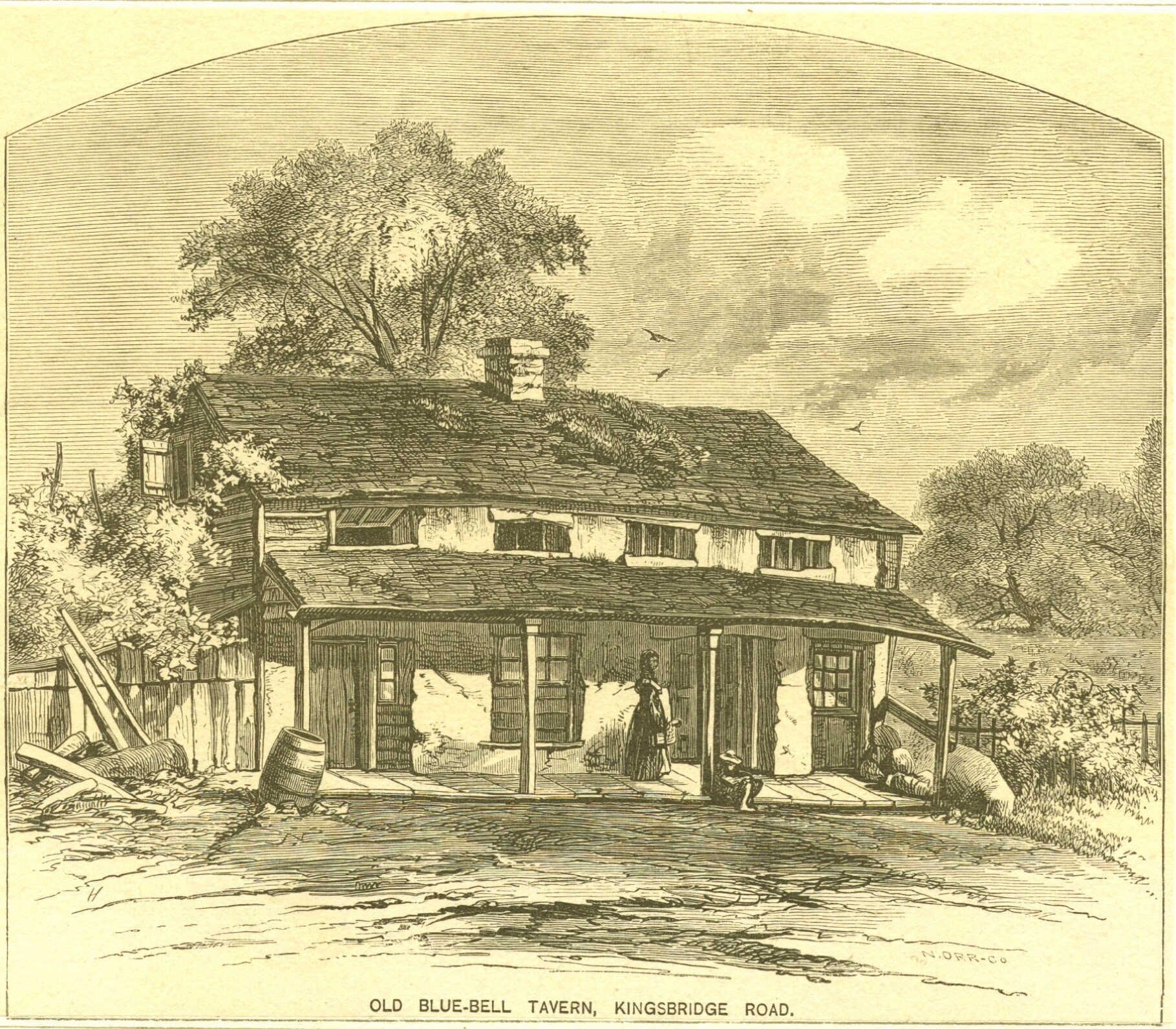
Blue Bell Tavern on Broadway

At the northwest corner of 181st Street and Broadway (then Kingsbridge Road) was the Blue Bell Tavern, built in the early-mid 18th century as an inn and site of social gatherings. When New York's Provincial Congress assented to the Declaration of Independence on July 9, 1776, the head of the statue of George III ended up on a spike at the Blue Bell Tavern, broken off by a "rowdy" group of civilians and soldiers at Bowling Green.

During the British evacuation of New York in 1783, George Washington and his staff stood in front of the tavern as they watched the American troops march southward to retake the city. After changing ownership several times, the tavern moved to a new building in 1885, following the original structure's destruction for the widening of Broadway.

=== 20th century ===
In 1915, the tavern was demolished again to build the 3,500-seat Coliseum Theatre, which was demolished in 2021 after denial of its landmark status.

Before the apartment development of the 20th century, many wealthy citizens built grand mansions in Washington Heights. The most famous landowner in the southwest part of the neighborhood was ornithologist John James Audubon, whose estate encompassed the 20 acres (8.1 ha) from 155th to 158th Street west of Broadway. A mystery surrounds his family home by Riverside Drive, which was deconstructed and moved to a city lot to make room for new development in 1931, only for its remnants to vanish without a trace.

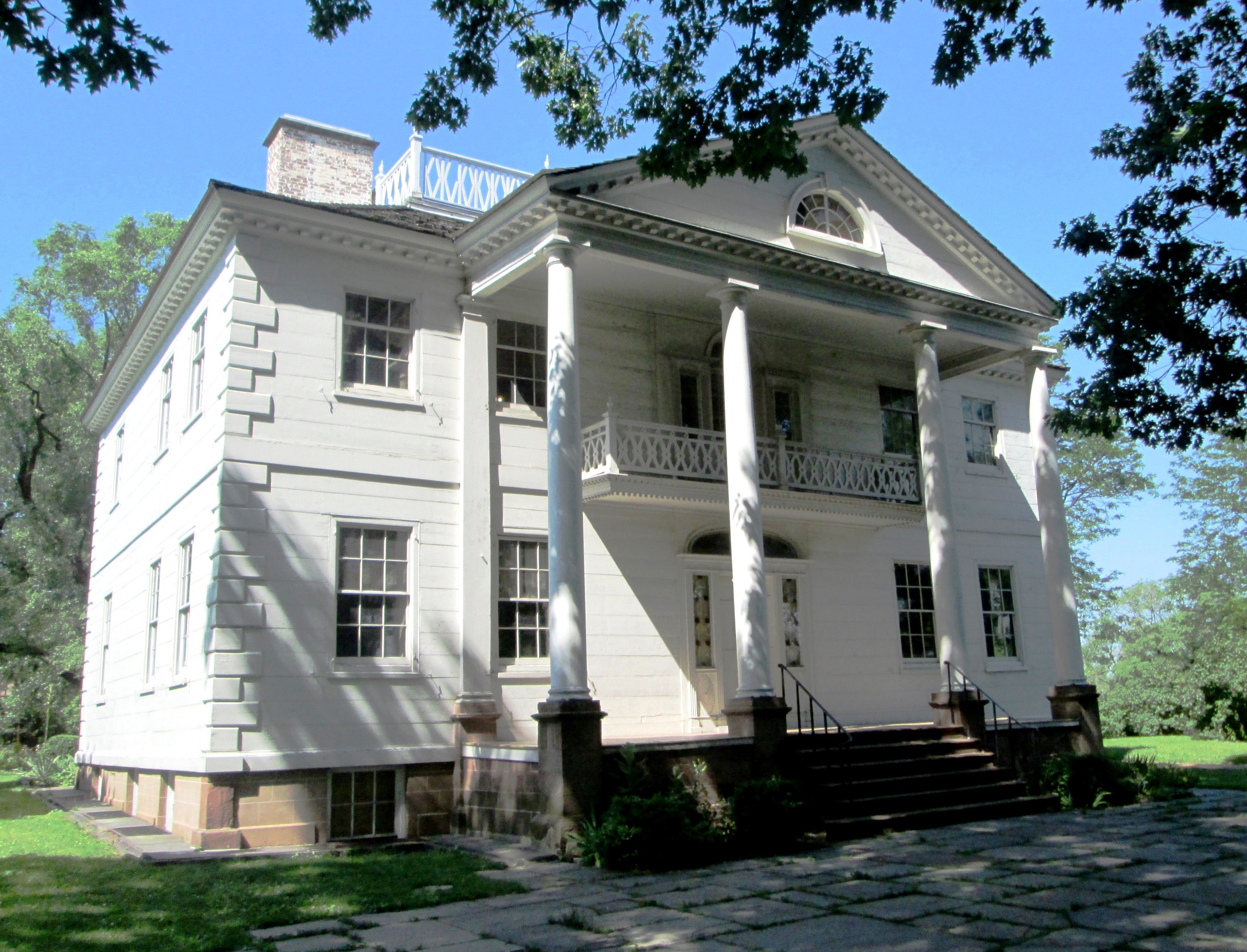
The Morris–Jumel Mansion

On the eastern side, by Edgecombe Avenue between 160th and 162nd Streets, the Morris–Jumel Mansion has been successfully preserved to this day. The land of the estate had been owned by Jan Kiersen and her son-in-law Jacob Dyckman before it was bought by British colonel Roger Morris in 1765 and completed the same year. In 1776, the house was commandeered as a headquarters by George Washington, and after changing hands a few times was purchased by Stephen and Eliza Jumel in 1810. In 1903, the City bought the mansion and it became a museum, the oldest surviving house in Manhattan.

With a picturesque view of the Palisades, the elevated ridge of northwest Washington Heights became the site of a few modern castles. The first of these was Libbey Castle, built by Augustus Richards after he purchased the land from Lucius Chittenden in 1855. Located near Margaret Corbin Circle, this estate was once owned by William "Boss" Tweed but got its current name from William Libbey, who purchased it in 1880.

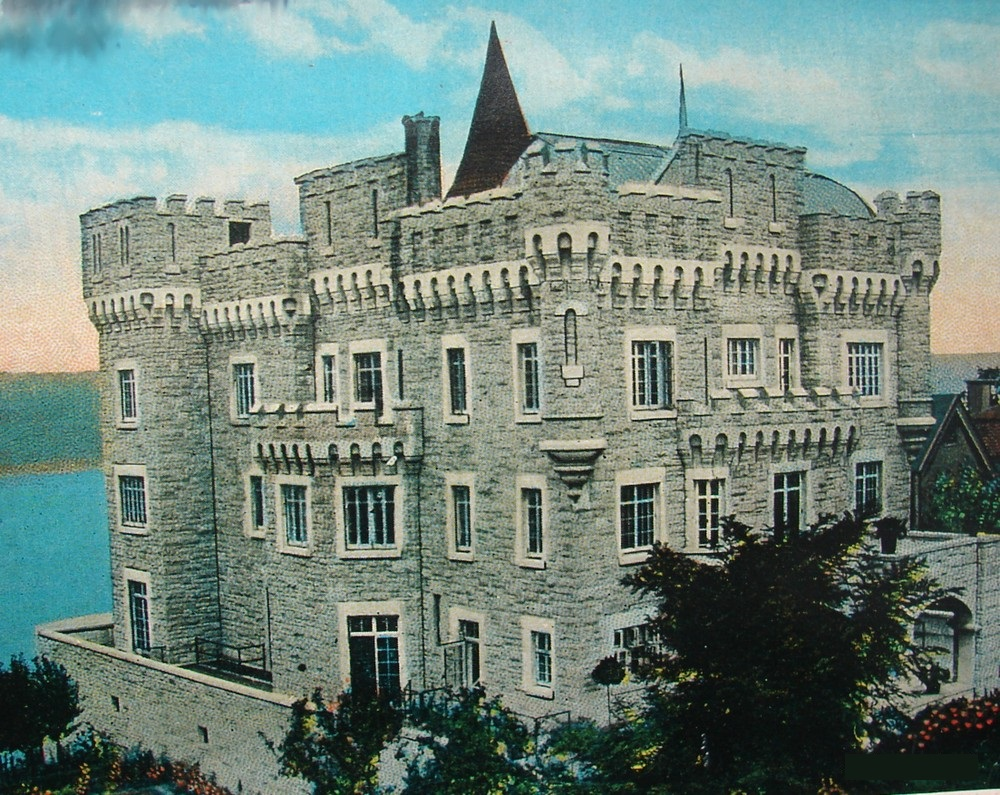
Paterno Castle

Even more extravagant, Paterno Castle was situated on the estate of real estate developer Charles Paterno by the Hudson River at 181st Street. Built in 1907, the mansion was demolished thirty years later for Paterno's Castle Village complex, where pieces of the original structure still remain.

The neighborhood's largest estate was the property of industrial tycoon C. K. G. Billings, taking up 25 acres (10 ha) in the southern part of Fort Tryon Park. Although the Louis XIV-style mansion at present-day Linden Terrace burned to the ground in 1925, Billings Terrace remains, supported by the elegant stone archway that originally led to the Billings mansion.

Initial residential development in Washington Heights began in the late 19th century with the construction of row and wood-frame houses in the southern portion of the neighborhood, particularly near Amsterdam Avenue. In 1886, the Third Avenue Railway was extended from 125th Street to 155th Street along Amsterdam Avenue. However, higher residential density would not be supported until the extension of the Interborough Rapid Transit Company (IRT)'s first subway line (now part of the Broadway–Seventh Avenue Line). The IRT built the 157th Street, 168th Street, 181st Street, and Dyckman Street stations between 1904 and 1906 (the 191st Street station opened as an infill station in 1911).

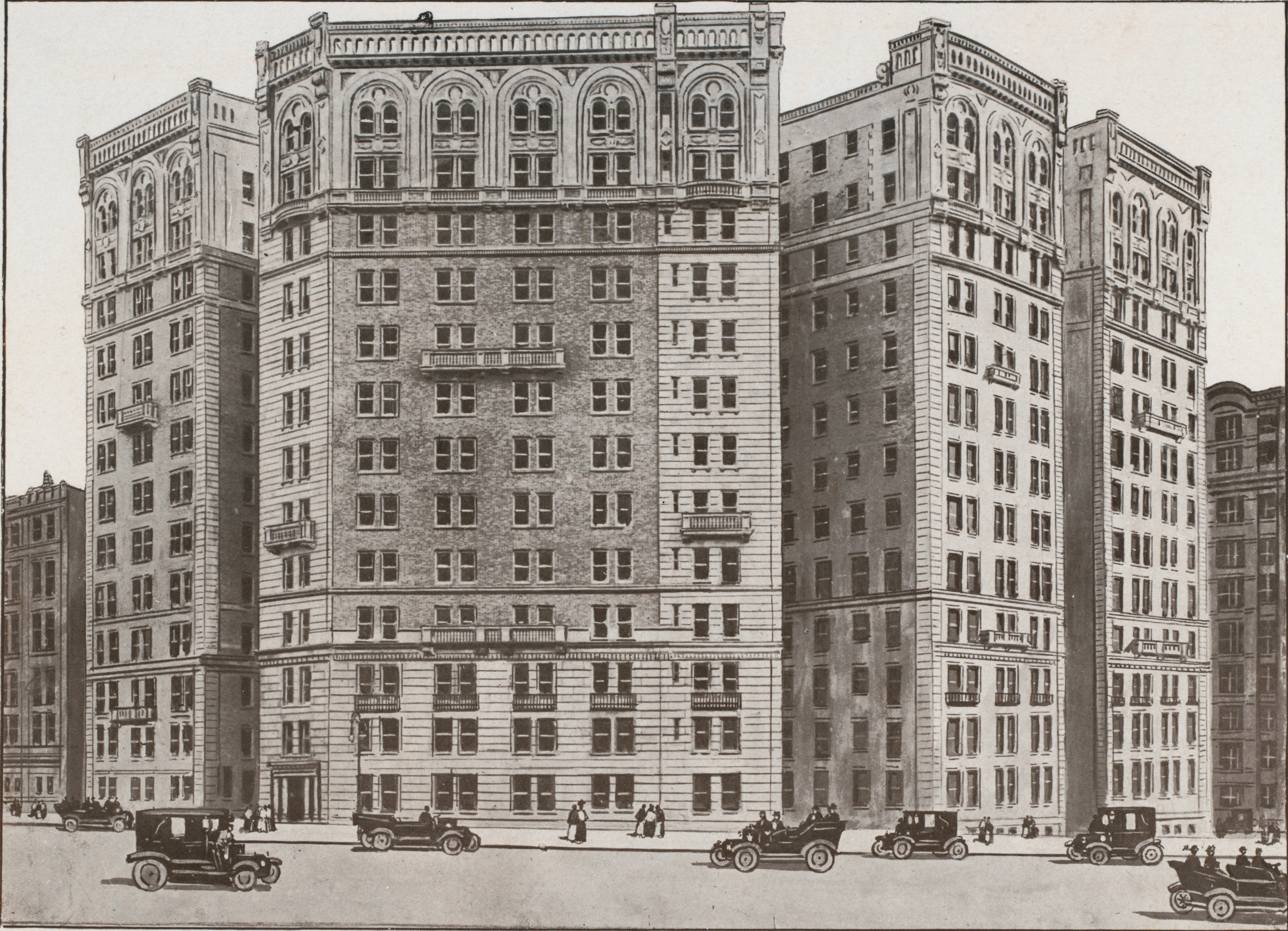
The Riviera at 156th Street and Riverside Drive, in 1910

Although skyrocketing land values sparked early predictions that upper-class apartment buildings would dominate the neighborhood, such development was limited in the pre-World War I period to the Audubon Park area west of Broadway and south of 158th Street. Buildings such as the 13-story Riviera included elaborate decor and generous amenities to attract higher-paying tenants.

The southern and eastern parts of Washington Heights experienced a construction boom in the years leading up to World War I. The downtown access provided by the IRT prompted a rapid increase in density through the proliferation of five- and six-story New Law Tenements, the vast majority of which remain. Many of the new residents came from crowded immigrant neighborhoods such as the Lower East Side, which saw its density halved between 1910 and 1930. As a result of the development of new housing, the total population of Manhattan north of 155th Street grew from just 8,000 in 1900 to 110,000 by 1920. The incoming residents of Washington Heights were a diverse group of people of European descent. In 1920, nearly half were Protestant, most of whom had parents born in the United States; the remainder was split between Jews and Catholics, typically immigrants or born to immigrant parents.

The next wave of urbanization for Washington Heights came in the 1920s, coinciding with the construction boom occurring across the city. The population increased significantly in the central area west of Broadway, and drastically in the area north of 181st Street, populating the last of the undeveloped areas just south and west of Fort Tryon Park. Transit for new residents was improved with the construction of the Independent Subway System (IND)'s Eighth Avenue Line in 1932, with stops at 175th Street, 181st Street, and 190th Street along Fort Washington Avenue.

The demographics of the neighborhood were undergoing significant change. While the Protestant population remained stagnant, first- and second-generation Irish and Eastern European Jews continued to move in. By 1930, nearly a quarter of Manhattan's Jewish residents lived north of 155th Street. The neighborhood also saw an influx of German Jews escaping Nazism in the 1930s and 1940s, a history documented by Steven M. Lowenstein's book Frankfurt-on-the-Hudson (a nickname referencing the origin city of many in the diaspora). One attractive aspect of Washington Heights for German Jews was likely its Eastern European Jewish presence, but an economic pull was its abundance of housing stock from the 1920s construction boom. Although rents were higher than average, many landlords offered some free rent to draw new tenants, and apartments were nonetheless spacious for their cost.

In the first half of the 20th century, tensions broke out between Catholics and Jews, who were not very segregated residentially but remained in separate social spheres. Around the start of World War II, Irish groups such as the far-right Christian Front arose, drawing large crowds to their antisemitic rallies, coupled with the vandalism of synagogues and beating of Jewish youth by Irish youth in gangs such as the Amsterdams. After continual charges of police negligence, a committee was created to combat the violence and many members of the Irish gangs were arrested. By 1944, the local Catholic Clergy were pressured to speak out against the prejudice, and Jews, Catholics, and Protestants began working together on solutions to ease the tensions.

Around this time, Washington Heights also gained its first substantial population of black residents, by 1943 numbering around 3,000 and concentrated mainly in the southeastern part of the neighborhood. The black population of Washington Heights was dwarfed, however, by that of Hamilton Heights, where white residents were 63% of the population in 1943. It was during this period that the popular boundary of Washington Heights shifted from 135th Street to 155th Street, as many residents of European descent refused to include African Americans in their conception of the neighborhood. This attitude was expressed in a phrase heard in the time period: "Washington Heights begins where Harlem ends." In fact, many of the neighborhood's new Jewish arrivals had left from Harlem as it became increasingly populated by black people from the South during the Great Migration.

==== Segregation and racism ====
Despite the growth of the black population, racial segregation remained very rigid. While in the vast majority of blocks less than 2% of housing units were occupied by non-white residents, nearly every block east of Amsterdam Avenue and south of 165th Street was over 90% non-white by 1950.

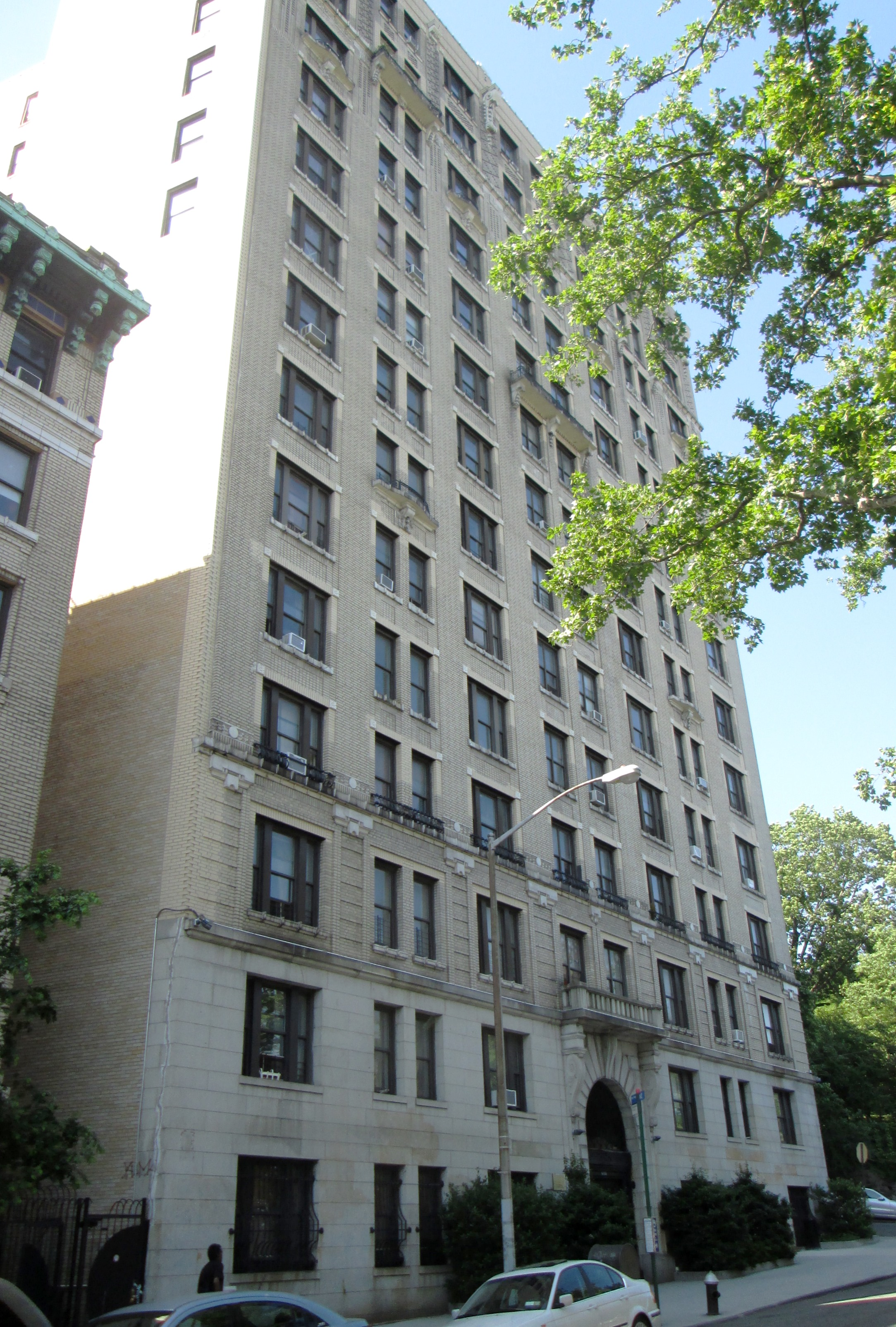
555 Edgecombe Avenue

The process underlying this segregation is exemplified in the history of one of Washington Heights' most famous apartment buildings: 555 Edgecombe Avenue. Built in 1914, the 14-story building rented to various relatively affluent white people until 1939, when the owner cancelled all the tenants' leases and began renting exclusively to black people. While organizations like the Neighborhood Protective Association of Washington Heights had kept the neighborhood virtually all-white throughout much of the 20th century, the overcrowded conditions of Harlem led to growth in demand for apartments outside the neighborhood.

Throughout the 1940s, the building had a number of notable black residents, such as Paul Robeson, Kenneth Clark, and Count Basie. The presence of middle-class black people in 555 Edgecombe and other higher-class buildings in southeast Washington Heights led many to associate it with Sugar Hill, the Harlem sub-neighborhood spanning between Edgecombe Avenue and Amsterdam Avenue to its south.

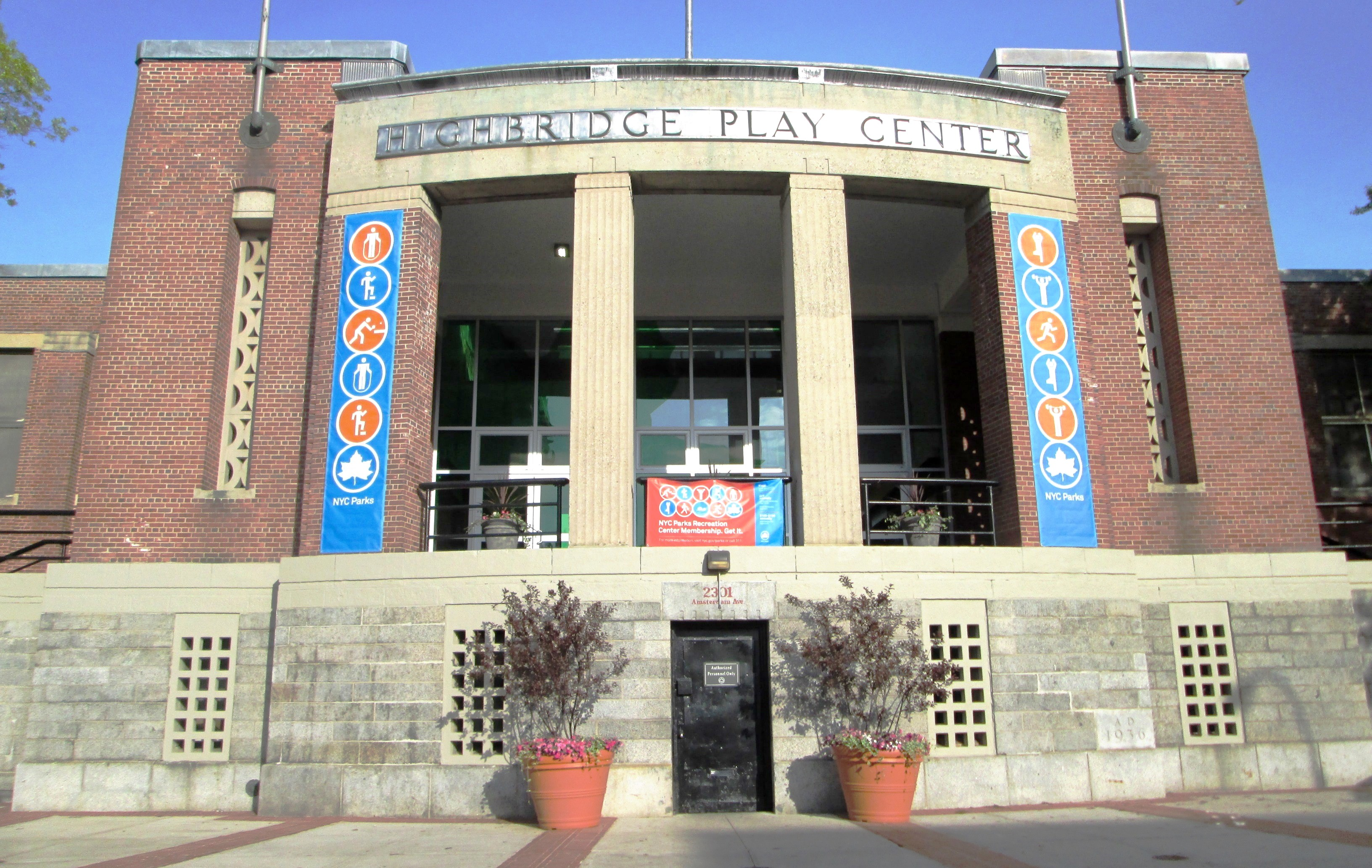
The Highbridge Play Center, which features the Highbridge Pool.

In addition to segregation, racism also manifested itself in gang culture, where youth often defined themselves by race or ethnicity and violently defended their respective territories. These tensions were brought to a climax in 1957, with the assault of two teenagers of European ancestry, Michael Farmer and Roger McShane, members of the majority-Irish "Jesters" gang. The incident took place in the Highbridge Pool, a Works Progress Administration-funded pool built in 1936 which had no racial restrictions but was nonetheless an environment of racial hostility in the changing landscape of the neighborhood.

The assault, which ended in Michael Farmer's death, was perpetrated by an alliance of the African-American Egyptian Kings and the Puerto Rican Dragons, both based in West Harlem just south of the Heights. The supposed motive for the attack was to counter the perception that Highbridge Pool was "owned" by the Jesters, and black and Latino youths were often called racial slurs and chased away from the surrounding blocks. As Eric Schneider analyzes in Vampires, Dragons, and Egyptian Kings: Youth Gangs in Postwar New York, the incident illustrated the effects of the neighborhood's demographic shift: The Jesters defined themselves as fighting against black and Latino occupancy of the neighborhood even as they included newly arrived black people in their ranks (similar diversity was seen in the membership of the Dragons and Egyptian Kings).

==== White flight and Latino immigration ====
While signs were slowly appearing for the first half of the 20th century that Washington Heights would not forever be a neighborhood of European Americans, the 1960s and 1970s featured full force demographic shifts. Washington Heights' upwardly mobile white residents began to leave in great numbers, and lower-income Latino population saw great increases. Apart from the allure of suburban homes and their economic capacity to buy them, white residents were spurred to leave by the demographic changes themselves, increasing negligence of residential buildings, and rising crime (having more than doubled between 1969 and 1982). Compared to the white flight occurring in other neighborhoods such as the West Bronx, the process was much slower and less destructive as few buildings were outright abandoned or burned.

While Puerto Ricans had been the dominant Latino group in the 1950s, by 1965 Cubans and Dominicans had overtaken them in number, and by 1970 native Spanish speakers were the majority group in central-eastern census tracts. Despite being a smaller group, Cuban immigrants in the Heights had an outsized role in business, owning, according to a 1976 estimate, the majority of Latino-owned stores. The neighborhood's black population also increased, numbering over 25,000 by 1980, and residing in all areas of the neighborhood while remaining a plurality in the southeastern section.

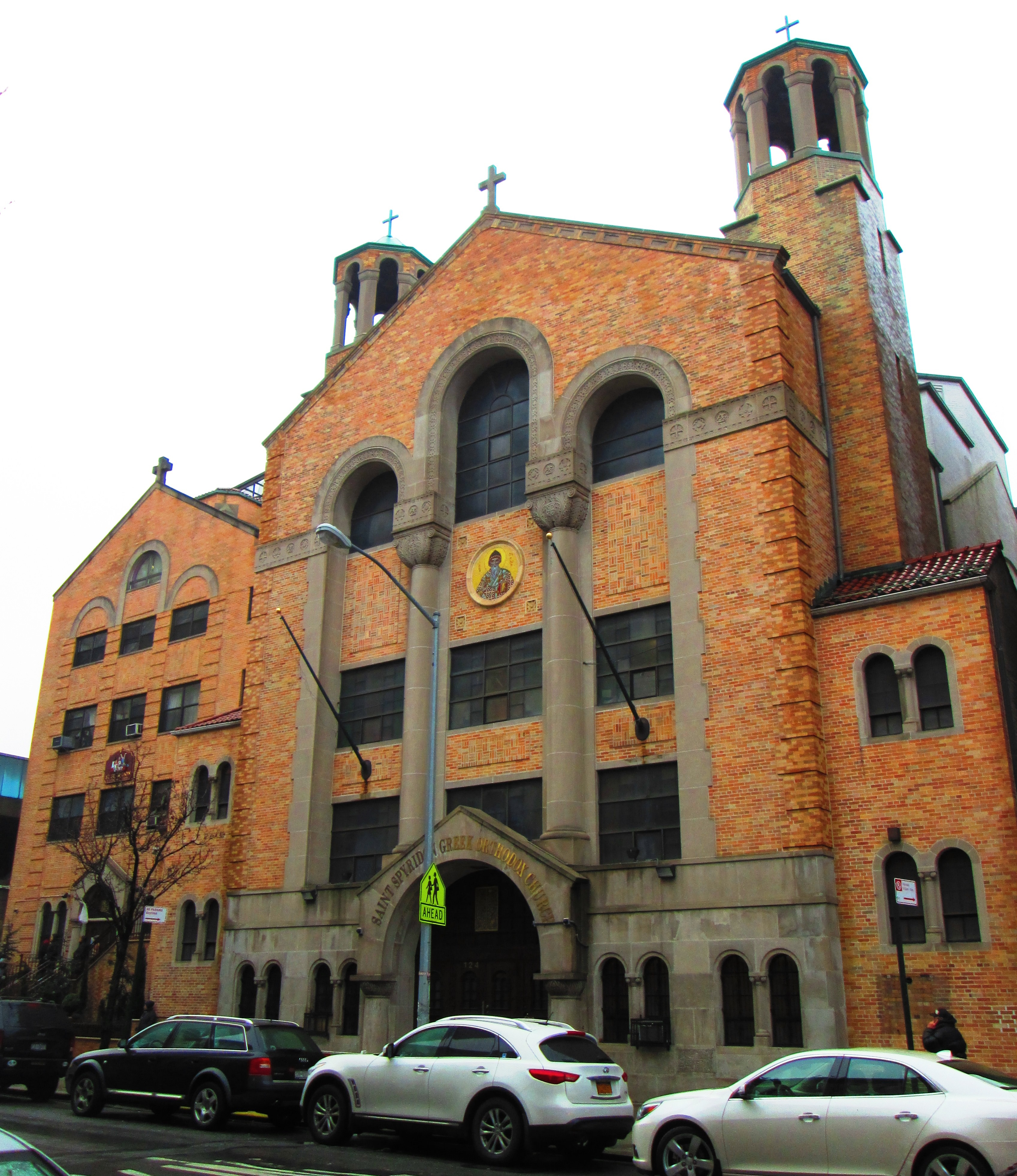
St. Spyridon Greek Orthodox Church

While the overall trend was one of exodus by white residents, the rate of this trend varied among different groups. One of the most pronounced changes occurred with Greek immigrants, who had reached their peak in the 1950s with the establishment of St. Spyridon Greek Orthodox Church and an accompanying school, only to see within two decades nearly all of the congregation had left for the suburbs. On the other hand, the German Jewish exodus was characterized by a decrease in overall population but an increasing presence in the neighborhood's northwestern corner. By the 1970s, evidence of the exodus of the broader Jewish community was present in the changing landscape of the neighborhood, where kosher stores and Jewish bakeries were gradually replaced by new small businesses with signs in Spanish.

While some Dominican immigrants had been arriving in Washington Heights throughout the 1950s and 1960s, the pace increased drastically during the regime of Joaquín Balaguer, who took power in the Dominican Republic in 1966 following the Dominican Civil War. The combination of the recent passing of the U.S. Immigration and Nationality Act of 1965, Balaguer's policy of freely granting passports, and the Dominican Republic's high unemployment rate created the conditions for growing emigration from the Dominican Republic to the United States. Some of the initial migrants were left-wing revolutionaries exiled by the Balaguer regime, theorized to have been granted visas through an unwritten agreement with the United States, but the majority of arrivals came for better economic opportunities.

In Quisqueya on the Hudson: The Transnational Identity of Dominicans in Washington Heights, Jorge Duany describes how Washington Heights developed as a "transnational community", continually defined by its connection to the Dominican Republic. The majority of Dominican immigrants viewed their stay in the United States as purely economically motivated while they remained culturally attached to the Dominican Republic; many also sent remittances home, imagining an eventual retirement to the island.

Even Puerto Rican musician Bad Bunny mentioned Washington Heights in his lyrics: Con la nota en high por Washington Heights" in his 2025 single, Nuevayol.

==== School conflicts ====
During the 1970s, Washington Heights' School District 6 (including Inwood and Hamilton Heights) was the scene of numerous conflicts over de facto racial segregation and unequal resource distribution within the district's schools. The School Decentralization Act, passed by the New York State Legislature in 1969, set up elected boards for New York City's school districts with limited hiring power and control over Title I funds. At the time, District 6's demographics were rapidly changing due to white students' withdrawal from the public school system and the broader trend of white flight, while the black and Latino student population rapidly increased.

This resulted in a stark gap between the district's few racially integrated schools, which enjoyed better academic reputations and access to resources, and the remainder of schools with very few white students and serious overcrowding problems. Fierce competition between different factions for educational funding and new schools was compounded by the disproportionate representation of the majority-white northwestern Heights on the board, creating an environment in which public meetings were plagued by incivility and at times even violence.

George Washington High School, located on 193rd Street and Audubon Avenue near Highbridge Park, faced numerous issues representative of the changes and conflicts of the neighborhood's public schools, which intersected in 1970 to produce a situation of extreme chaos. Located in a grand building with a Works Progress Administration mural by Lucienne Bloch, the school was relatively prestigious in the decades after its 1925 founding, graduating people such as Alan Greenspan, Henry Kissinger, and Murray Jarvik. Although George Washington remained racially mixed through the early 1970s, the school had a tracking system that saw white students leave the school better prepared for college, and violence frequently broke out among gangs identifying by race.

Discontent with academics and school policy led to a wave of student demonstrations, supported by a group of parents who pushed to set up an information table in the school's lobby in order to answer questions and hear complaints regarding the school. However, the United Federation of Teachers – which had also clashed with students and parents over the 1964 school boycott and the 1968 teachers' strike – perceived this as an attempt to subvert teachers' authority, leading them to start a local strike after the administration reached a compromise with parents over the table.

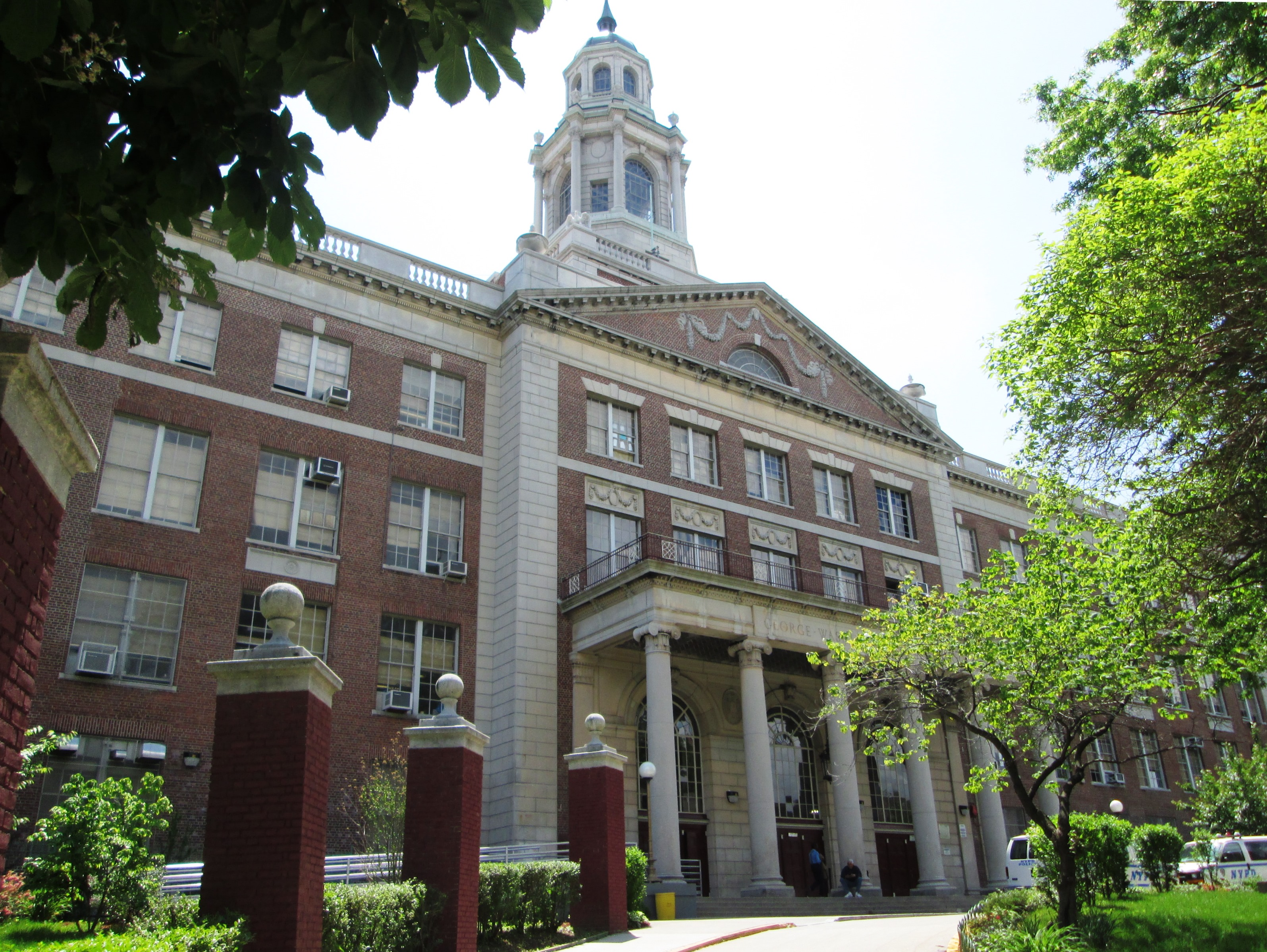
George Washington Educational Campus

By the end of 1970, the high school had seen the resignation of three principals and multiple incidents of violence against students, teachers, and security guards; while many safety improvements were made throughout the 1970s, its academic performance continued to decline. In 1999, the school took its present form as the George Washington Educational Campus composed of four smaller schools.

=== Late 20th and early 21st centuries ===
==== Immigration trends ====
For the remainder of the 20th century, the Dominican community of Washington Heights continued to increase considerably, most notably during the mid to late 1980s, when over 40,000 Dominicans settled in Washington Heights, Hamilton Heights, and Inwood. Around the year 2000, the Dominican community reached its peak and became a slim majority of Washington Heights and Inwood, propelling the neighborhoods' combined population to 208,000, the highest level since 1950.

Even as they arrived in great numbers, Dominicans who came to the neighborhood faced a difficult economic situation, with many of the manufacturing jobs they disproportionately occupied having disappeared throughout the 1970s and 1980s. This was clear by 1990, when the proportion of Dominican New Yorkers living in households below the poverty line was 36%, more than double the citywide rate. In addition to service work, many residents found local jobs in the small-scale garment sector and factory work in New Jersey.

During the late 20th century, other immigrant groups began to make their home in the neighborhood as well. In the late 1970s and early 1980s, a moderate influx of Soviet Jews occurred following a loosening of the country's emigration policy, predominantly professionals and artists pushed out by antisemitism and drawn by economic opportunity. The makeup of the neighborhood's Latino population also began to diversify beyond an exclusively Caribbean background, most prominently through the arrival of Mexicans and Ecuadorians, who together numbered over 6,000 by 2000 and over 10,000 a decade later.

Smaller communities of Central Americans, Colombians, and Chinese immigrants had also developed. The neighborhood's African-American population began to decrease from its height in the 1970s, making up less than one-tenth of the neighborhood by 2000. In the present day, Washington Heights also has an Orthodox Jewish community served by numerous synagogues, many of which have noticed more young Jewish families move into the neighborhood during the 2000s.

==== 1980s crime and drug crisis ====
In the 1980s and early 1990s, Washington Heights was severely affected by the crack-cocaine epidemic, as was the rest of New York City. Washington Heights had become one of the largest drug distribution centers in the Northeastern United States, bringing a negative reputation to Dominican Americans as a group. Then-U.S. Attorney Rudy Giuliani and Senator Alphonse D'Amato chose the corner of 160th Street and Broadway for their widely publicized undercover crack purchase, and in 1989, The New York Times called the neighborhood "the crack capital of America". By 1990, crack's impact on crime was evident: 103 murders were committed in the 34th Precinct that year, along with 1,130 felony assaults, 1,919 robberies, and 2,647 burglaries.

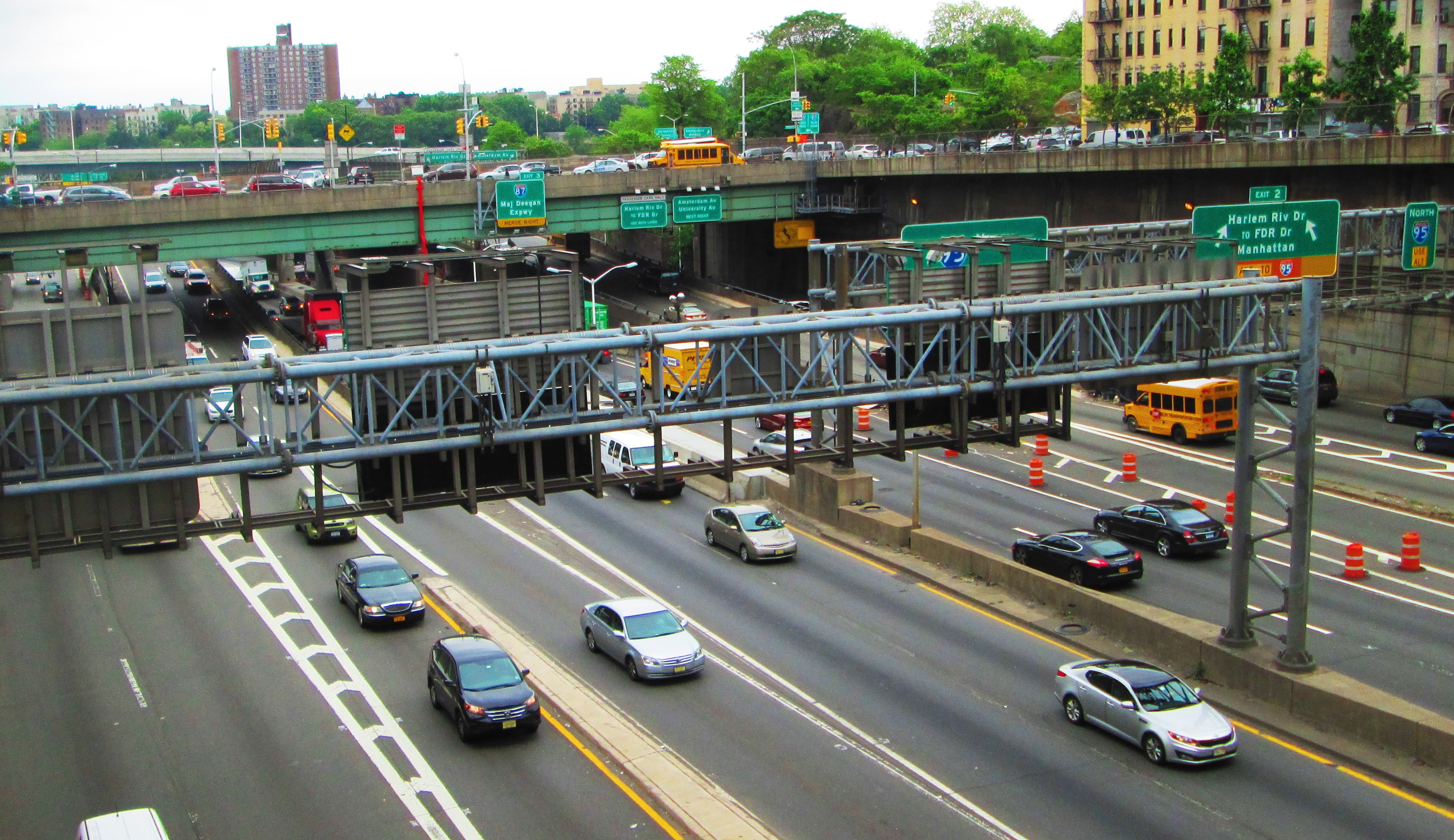
The Trans-Manhattan Expressway, one of several highway connections that made Washington Heights a hotspot for the cocaine trade in the 1980s.

The causes behind the severity of the crisis for Washington Heights, however, were more intricate. One was the neighborhood's location: the George Washington Bridge and its numerous highway connections made for easy access from the New Jersey suburbs. Another contributing factor was that, as Dominican drug dealers such as Santiago Luis Polanco Rodríguez brought the group higher status in cocaine operations, the heavily Dominican Washington Heights became increasingly important as a strategic location. Washington Heights also had a high level of unemployment and poverty in the 1980s and 1990s, providing ample economic motivation for young people to enter the drug trade.

The effects of the crack trade extended beyond physical danger to a breakdown in trust and widespread fear provoked by violence in public places, as well as murders of people uninvolved in the drug business. It was common for police and detectives to note unresponsiveness from residents during murder inquiries. Overall distrust of the police may have stemmed from the perception of corruption, which was alleged numerous times concerning the 34th Precinct overlooking drug crimes in return for bribes.

Tensions between residents and the New York Police Department (NYPD) came to a head on July 4, 1992, when José "Kiko" Garcia was shot by 34th Precinct Officer Michael O'Keefe on the corner of 162nd Street and Saint Nicholas Avenue. Although evidence later supported that the killing was a reaction to violence initiated by Garcia, many residents quickly suspected wanton police brutality. The suspicion was not unfounded, as O'Keefe already had several civilian complaints of unnecessary aggression in arrests. What began as a peaceful demonstration for Garcia's death turned into a violent riot, causing multiple fires, 15 injuries, and one death. Then-mayor David Dinkins, who had met with the Garcia family following the killing, pleaded for an end to the rioting: "You do not build a better city by destroying it.... There is much anger in the community about the death of Jose Garcia and other incidents. But you do not obtain justice by being unjust to others."

==== Crime drop and community improvement ====
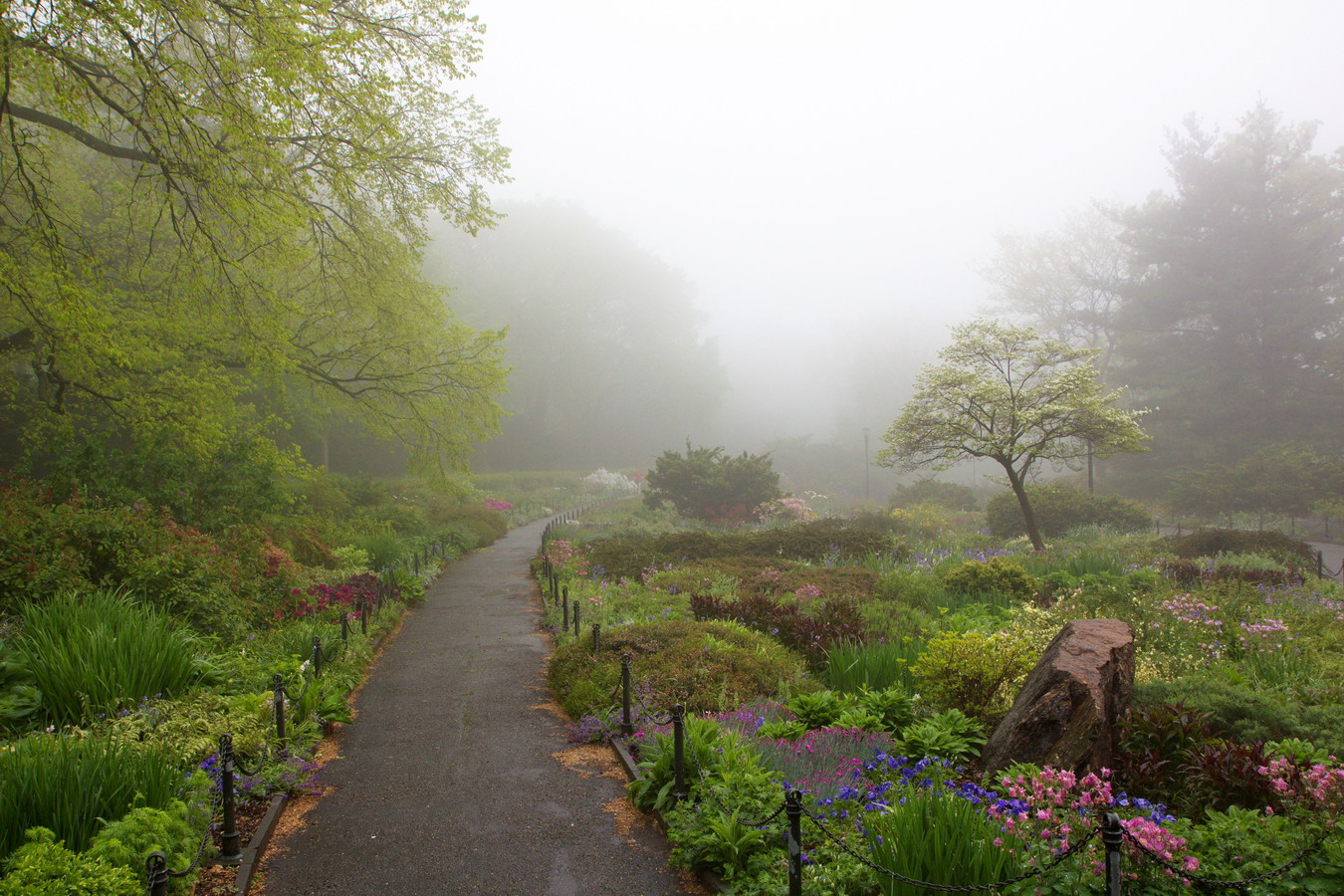
Heather Garden, one of Fort Tryon Park's areas that was refurbished during the 1980s and 1990s

During the mid to late 1990s, Washington Heights experienced a drastic decrease in crime that continued through the 21st century. From 1990 to 2023, reported motor-vehicle thefts, murders, and burglaries each fell by over 85%, felony assaults, rapes, and robberies by over 65%, and grand larcenies by around 45%. The 30th and 32nd precincts to the south of Washington Heights, which cover most of Harlem north of 133rd Street, experienced just as drastic crime drops during the next decades.

The crime drop, which was felt across all major U.S. cities, owed itself largely to the decrease in new users and dealers of crack cocaine, and the move of existing dealers from dealing on the streets to dealing from inside apartments. In Washington Heights, this meant a move back to the established cocaine dealing culture that had existed before the introduction of crack. As Terry Williams observes in The Cocaine Kids: The Inside Story of a Teenage Drug Ring, many dealers from the pre-freebasing period put greater emphasis on knowing their customers and hid their operations more carefully from police, as opposed to dealers of the crack days who would deal openly and fight violently in the competition for the drug's high profits.

Many also credit actions taken at the neighborhood level in increasing safety in Washington Heights. In 1994, after years of advocacy from residents, the NYPD split the 34th Precinct to create the 33rd Precinct for Washington Heights south of 179th Street in order to devote more resources to crime prevention. Another local policing strategy was the "model block" initiative, first attempted in 1997 on 163rd Street between Broadway and Amsterdam Avenue, a location notable for the dealers who set up a "fortified complex" complete with traps and electrified wires to prevent police raids on their apartment. In an attempt to disrupt drug activity on the block, police officers set up barricades at both ends of the block, demanded proof of residence from anyone coming through, patrolled building hallways, and pressured landlords to improve their buildings. The program was controversial, facing criticism from the New York Civil Liberties Union and resistance from residents for its invasion of privacy. The initiative was later expanded throughout the city.

As crime decreased, Washington Heights also saw a recovery of many of its community institutions, including parks. Fort Tryon Park had fallen into a period of decline after the 1975 New York City fiscal crisis, when evaporated New York City Parks Department funds left its walkways and playgrounds in a state of disrepair, and several corpses were found in the park.

=== 21st century ===
After work from the Fort Tryon Park Trust and the New York Restoration Project throughout the 1990s and 2000s, funded by the city with the help of generous private donations, the park and its reputation were restored. Highbridge Park, however, had the same problems as Fort Tryon Park but went without any major restoration funding for a while, likely due to its location in a lower-income area and lack of a frequently touristed landmark like the Cloisters. In 1997, the New York Restoration Project began to work on maintaining the park, but without the necessary funding much of the park's disrepair continued. In 2016, however, the park received $30 million in restoration funding through the city's Anchor Parks initiative, with the full restoration targeted to be finished by 2021.

Throughout the 2010s, Washington Heights residents made modest economic gains. According to American Community Survey data the neighborhood's poverty rate decreased from 27% to 18% in the approximate 2008–2018 period. In the same period, the unemployment rate decreased from 14% to 9% and the proportion of residents with bachelor's degrees increased from 29% to 35%. Washington Heights has faced gentrification throughout the 2000s, with data from the New York University Furman Center finding that Washington Heights and Inwood's average residential rent had increased by 29.3% between 1990 and 2014. Furthermore, there several businesses were faced with drastic rent increases, such as Coogan's, a well-known restaurant and bar that managed to renegotiate with its landlord, NewYork-Presbyterian Hospital, following outcry by many locals, including Lin-Manuel Miranda. Washington Heights residents face many difficulties with the rental housing market; over a quarter of households pay the majority of their income in rent. As of 2014, Washington Heights and Inwood had the highest rate of severe crowding in Manhattan. Washington Heights also had the city's second-highest rate of serious housing code violations and its lowest rental vacancy rate.

Many have expressed opposition to the neighborhood's gentrification on both commercial and residential fronts. Luis Miranda and Robert Ramirez of the Manhattan Times wrote in 2005, "How sad and ironic that many of the same people who fought to save our neighborhoods in the face of thugs and drugs have ultimately been forced to surrender their communities to the almighty dollar." Echoing this sentiment, Crossing Broadway author Robert W. Snyder said, "The people who saved Washington Heights in the days of crime and crack deserve more for their pains than a stiff rent increase." Fears about displacement in Upper Manhattan manifested themselves in a controversy surrounding a 2018 Inwood rezoning plan, which, despite its offers of community benefits and affordable housing, was accused of accelerating real-estate speculation.

In 2018, ground was broken on Amsterdam Avenue and 180th Street by developer Youngwoo & Associates for the MVRDV-designed Radio Tower & Hotel. The tower, a 22-story multi-use building with office space, retail space, and a 221-room hotel, was the first major mixed-use development to be built in Washington Heights in nearly five decades. The hotel opened in July 2022.

== Geography ==
An 1874 topographical map displaying the elevated ridge of Upper Manhattan

Washington Heights is located on the high ridge of Upper Manhattan that extends west of Edgecombe Avenue from around 133rd Street to just below Dyckman Street. It contains the highest piece of land in Manhattan: an outcropping of schist 265 feet (81 m) above sea level in Bennett Park.

In the early 1900s, the neighborhood was considered to run as far south as 135th Street west of Central Harlem, encompassing most of the elevated area of Upper Manhattan. In the modern day, Washington Heights is typically defined as the area between Hamilton Heights at 155th Street and Inwood at Dyckman Street, although some have considered Washington Heights' southern boundary to be 158th Street.

=== Sub-neighborhoods ===
==== Hudson Heights ====
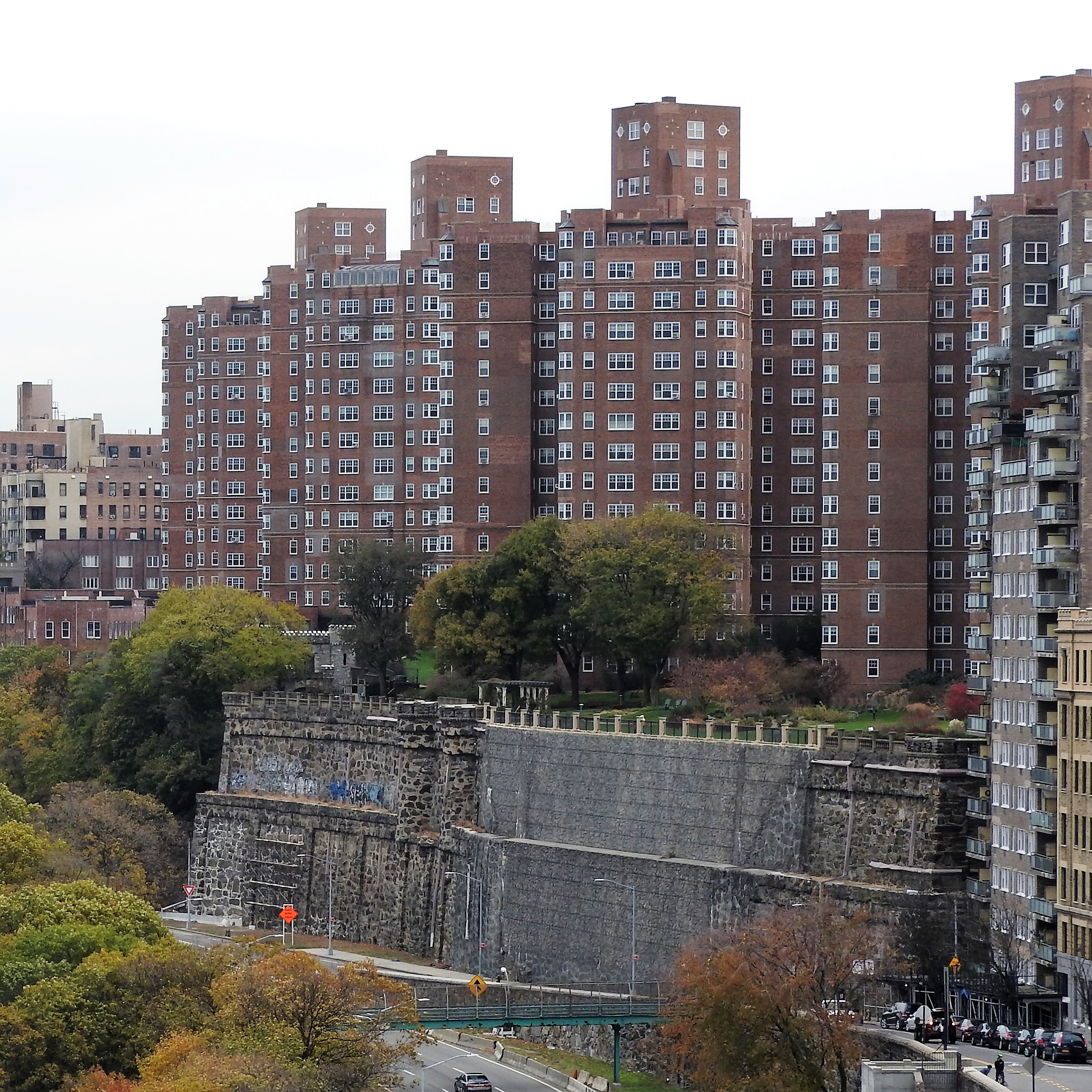
Castle Village, like other buildings in Hudson Heights, switched from rental occupation to co-op ownership in the 1980s.

The Hudson Heights sub-neighborhood is generally considered to cover the area west of Broadway and north of 181st Street or 179th Street, although some contend that its southern boundary extends as far as 173rd Street. The name was created by the Hudson Heights Owners' Coalition in 1992 to promote the sale of co-op apartments in the northwestern part of the neighborhood.

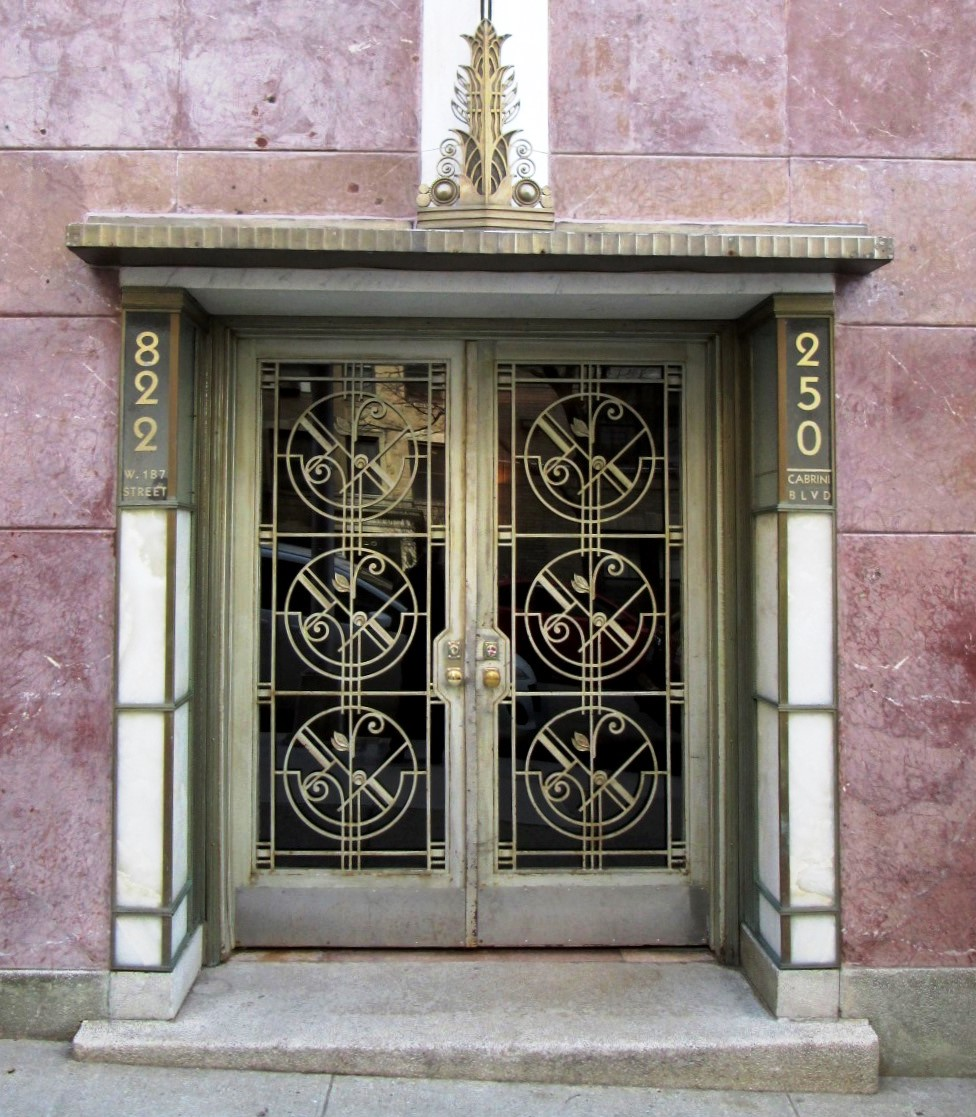
The entrance to 250 Cabrini Boulevard, also known as 822 West 187th Street, shows the Art Deco style prominent in the neighborhood.

Hudson Heights' name has been adopted by numerous newspapers, typically setting it apart from the rest of Washington Heights for its Art Deco decor, residential character, and closeness to Fort Tryon Park and the Hudson River. However, some disparage the name; Manhattan Borough Historian Robert W. Snyder argued that the name's intention was to "conceptually separate the area from the rest of Washington Heights," diminishing the "shared interest on both sides of Broadway."

While the name "Hudson Heights" may be relatively new, a divide between northwestern Washington Heights and the rest of the neighborhood has existed in some form in the neighborhood since the early 1900s. Census data from 1950 shows that rents in the western areas of the neighborhood tended to be slightly higher compared to the eastern areas, but the highest rents were almost entirely in the northwestern area, with its high concentration of more modern elevator buildings, and the Audubon Park Historic District, which has most of the neighborhood's few buildings with more than six stories.

This economic divide became racial as well during the 1970s and 1980s, as the majority of white residents who did not leave the neighborhood settled in the northwestern area. As of 2019, market rents remained significantly higher north of 181st Street and west of Broadway, though the most noticeable difference was the racial divide; as of 2020, Hudson Heights census blocks were 60% white, while census blocks east of Broadway were 13% white.

==== Fort George ====
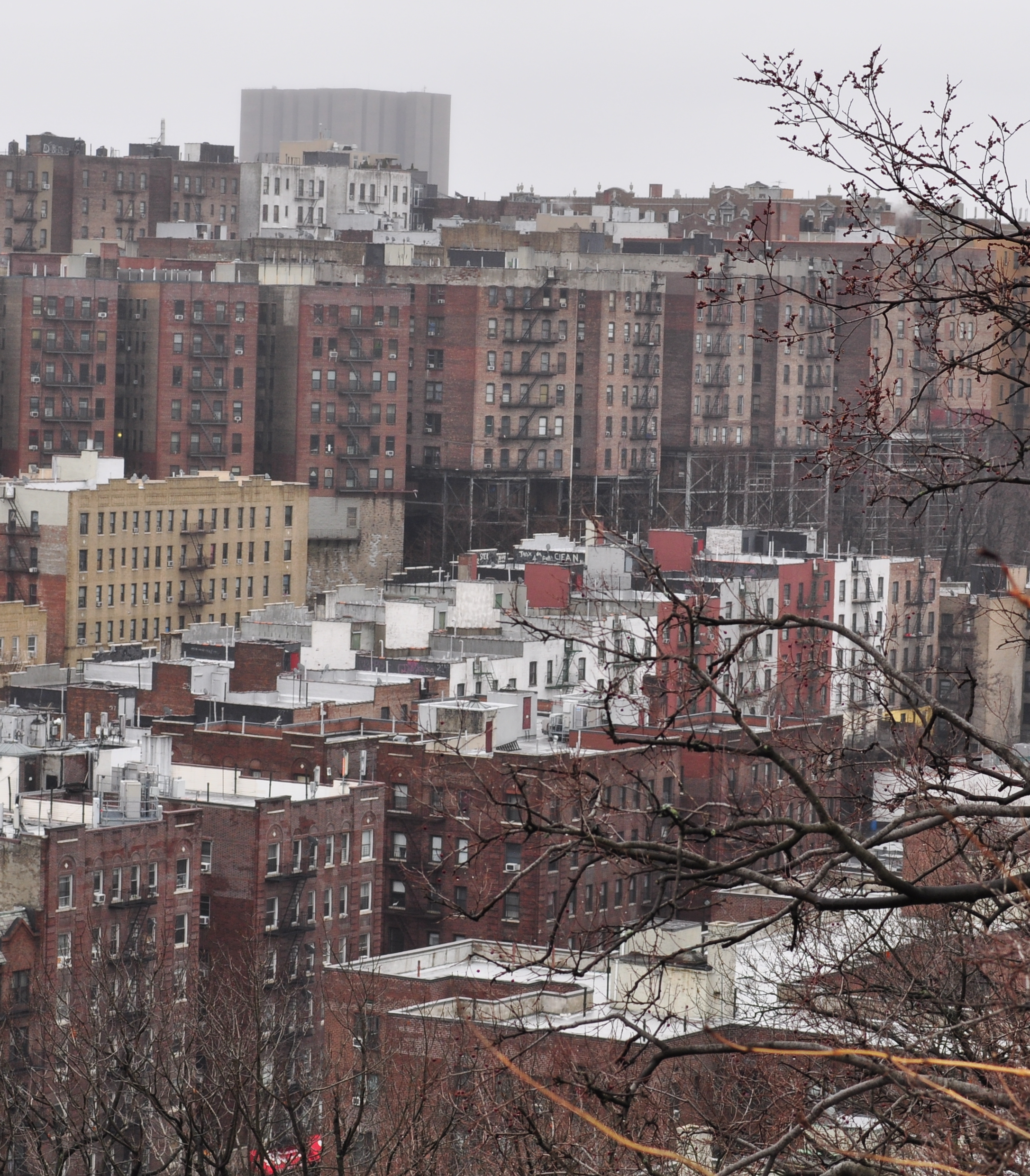
Apartment buildings in Fort George, with stilts along Fairview Avenue due to elevation differences

Named for the Revolutionary War's Fort George, the lesser-recognized Fort George sub-neighborhood runs east of Broadway from 181st Street to Dyckman Street. Educational institutions include Yeshiva College, located east of Amsterdam Avenue near Highbridge Park, and George Washington High School, on the nearby site of the original Fort George. Fort George also holds one of Manhattan's rare semi-private streets, Washington Terrace, which runs south from West 186th Street for a half-block between Audubon and Amsterdam avenues.

=== Elevation changes ===
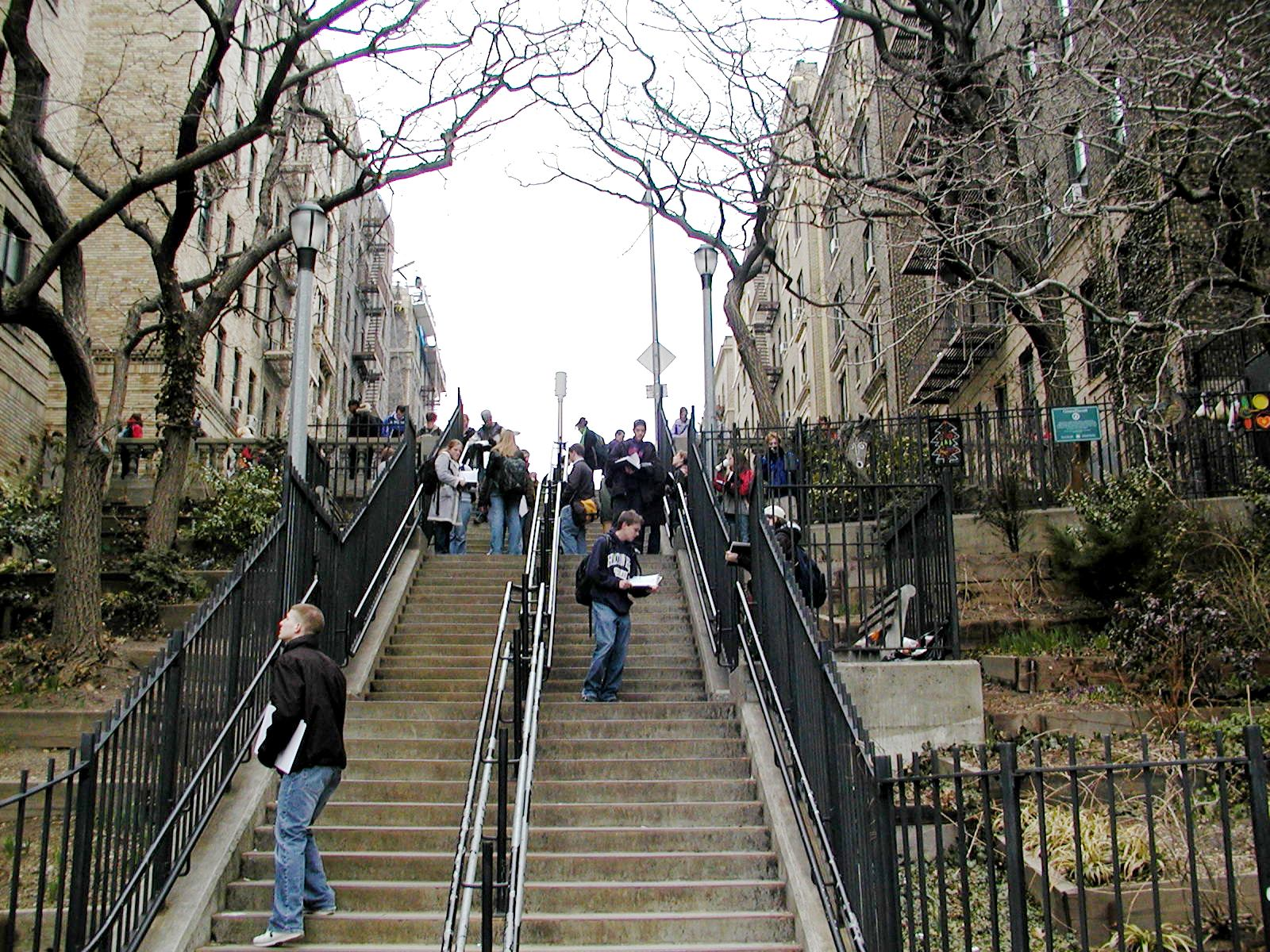
Stairs running from the end of Pinehurst Avenue down to West 181st Street

Because of its abrupt, hilly topography, pedestrian navigation in Upper Manhattan is facilitated by many step streets. The longest of these is a set of 130 stairs connecting Fort Washington Avenue and Overlook Terrace at 187th Street.

To help with eastward-westward transit in upper Washington Heights, elevators are available at the 181st Street IND station, with entrances on Overlook Terrace and Fort Washington Avenue at 184th Street, and the 190th Street station, with entrances on Fort Washington Avenue and Bennett Avenue. The 191st Street IRT station also has a pedestrian tunnel, with an entrance on Broadway near 190th Street, and free elevator connection. Exemplifying the abrupt changes in the area's terrain, the 191st Street and Dyckman Street IRT stations are at similar elevations compared to sea level, but the former is the city's deepest subway station below ground level, while the latter, just 0.4 miles (0.64 km) north, is above ground.

== Demographics ==
For census purposes, New York City government classifies Washington Heights as part of two neighborhood tabulation areas called Washington Heights North and Washington Heights South, split by 177th Street west of Broadway and 180th Street east of Broadway. Based on data from the 2020 United States Census, the population of Washington Heights was 143,879, a decrease of 23,249 (13.9%) from the 167,128 counted in 2000. Covering an area of 1,058.91 acres (428.53 ha), the neighborhood had a population density of 136.3 inhabitants per acre (87,200/sq mi; 33,700/km^{2}).

The racial makeup of the neighborhood was 64.1% (92,279) Hispanic or Latino of any race(s), 21.7% (31,155) white, 7.5% (10,823) African American, 3.5% (4,976) Asian, 0.9% (1,348) from other races, and 2.3% (3,298) from two or more races. Between 2000 and 2020, the white and Asian populations increased by 42% (9,157) and 39% (1,385), respectively, while the black and Hispanic/Latino populations decreased by 26% (3,766) and 25% (31,439), respectively.

In-depth demographic statistics are collected by the American Community Survey. Based on 2016–2020 data, an estimated 18% of the population was under 20 (compared to 23% citywide), 30% were ages 20 to 35 (24% citywide), 37% were ages 35 to 65 (38% citywide), and 15% were 65 and over (15% citywide). 46% of residents were foreign-born (36% citywide), of whom 56% were U.S. citizens (58% citywide). Of the population five years and over, 70% spoke a language other than English at home (48% citywide) and 35% spoke English less than "very well" (22% citywide).

The unemployment rate was 11% (7% citywide); 67% of workers commuted by public transportation (53% citywide) and 12% by automobile (27% citywide). Washington Heights had a median household income of $58,373 ($67,046 citywide) and a mean household income of $78,184 ($107,000 citywide). 18% of residents were considered below poverty (17% citywide); the rate among children and seniors was 25% (24% citywide) and 28% (18% citywide), respectively. With a median gross rent of $1,405 ($1,489 citywide), 28% of households paid over half of their income in rent (28% citywide).

== Culture ==
=== Little Dominican Republic ===
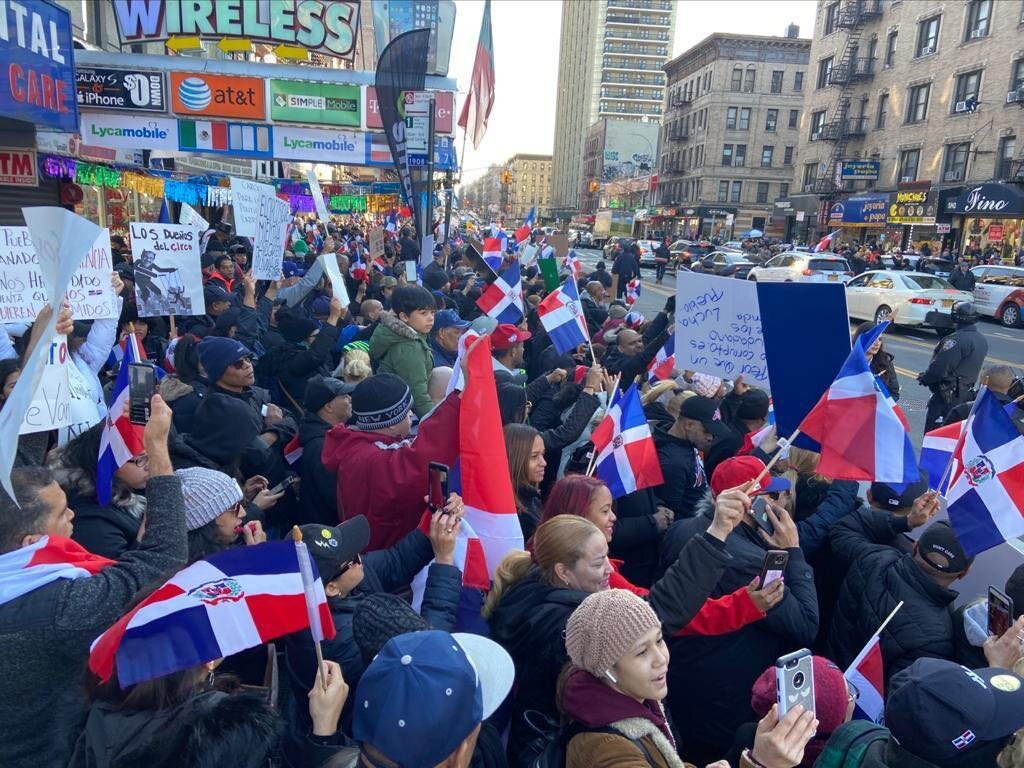
Local protests on February 22, 2020 over the postponement of elections in the Dominican Republic and the possibility of corruption.

Washington Heights was designated "Little Dominican Republic" along with Inwood and part of Hamilton Heights in 2018, an area where two-thirds of Hispanic/Latino residents identified as Dominican as of 2017. Another name sometimes given to the area is "Quisqueya Heights", in reference to a Taíno name for Hispaniola meaning "cradle of life". As Roberto Suro describes in Strangers Among Us: Latino Lives in a Changing America, many Dominicans in Washington Heights lead double lives between the United States and the Dominican Republic, moving between countries and investing money back home. Jorge Duany supports this analysis in Quisqueya on the Hudson, documenting how first-generation immigrants feel a strong cultural connection with the Dominican Republic, reinforced by frequent flights back to the island. A travel agency owner interviewed in The New York Times said, "For the Dominican to go to Santo Domingo during Christmas and summer is like the Muslims going to Mecca."

One of the most popular flights of the route between New York City and Santo Domingo was American Airlines Flight 587. In November 2001, the flight suffered an accidental crash in Belle Harbor, Queens shortly after takeoff from John F. Kennedy Airport, killing all 260 people aboard the plane as well as five Belle Harbor residents. Flight 587 had a long history among Dominican New Yorkers, even being referenced in Kinito Méndez and Johnny Ventura's song El Avión. A memorial to the crash was built in 2006 near Rockaway Beach and Boardwalk, inscribed with the victims' names and the Pedro Mir quote "Después no quiero más que paz" (which translates to "Afterwards I want nothing more than peace").

=== Religion ===
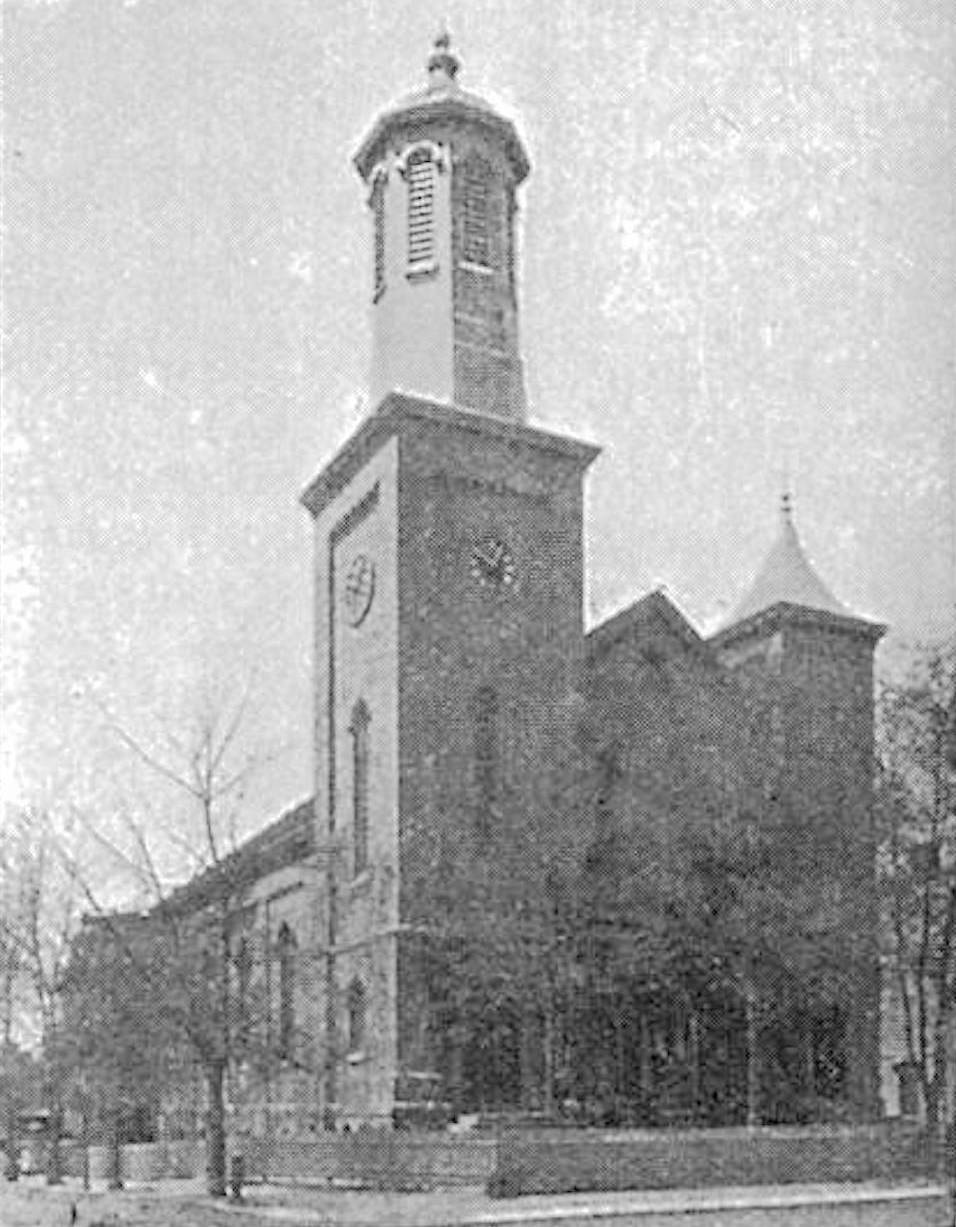
North Presbyterian Church, founded in 1847 and merged with two other congregations, has an English Gothic design in its present landmarked building, designed in 1904.

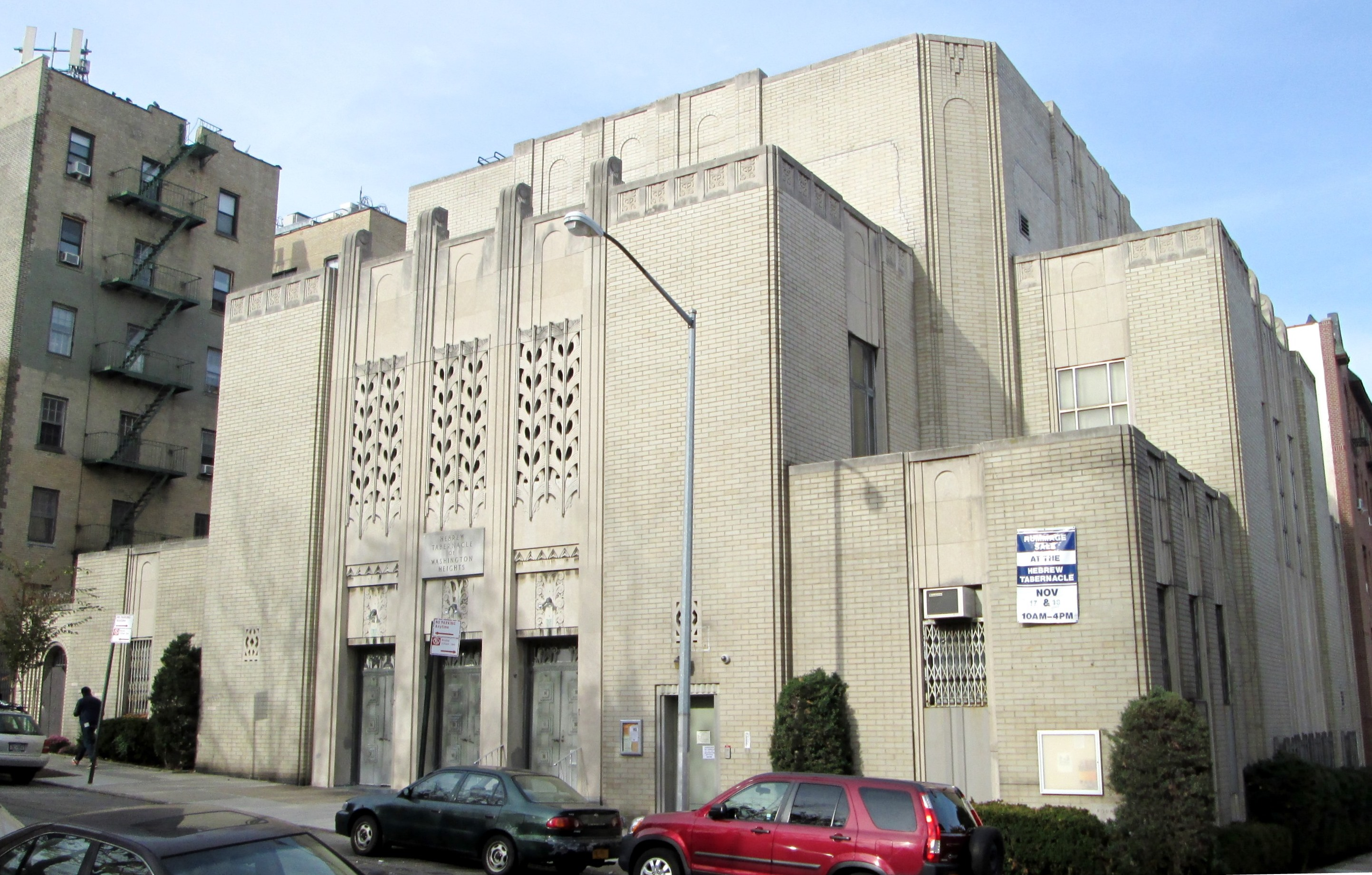
The Hebrew Tabernacle of Washington Heights is a Reform congregation whose former location on 161st Street became a Jehovah's Witnesses Kingdom Hall, while the current landmarked building was previously the Fourth Church of Christ, Scientist until its closure in 1973.

Washington Heights' religious institutions are primarily Jewish, Protestant, and Catholic. Some of Washington Heights and Inwood's earliest churches were the St. Elizabeth Church, the United Presbyterian Church, and the Mount Washington Presbyterian Church, all built in the mid to late 1800s before the neighborhood urbanized. Most of the neighborhood's places of worship date back to the early 1900s, but many have changed or moved as the ethnic composition changed in the later 1900s.

The landmarked Fort Washington Presbyterian Church, built in 1914 in neo-Georgian style according to plans by Thomas Hastings, is an example of how Washington Heights' religious institutions reflected demographic changes in the neighborhood. The church was constructed after a merger between two Presbyterian churches further south in order to have a location uptown, where many members of the previous congregations were moving. In 1982, the original congregation turned the church over to La Primera Iglesia Española de Washington Heights, a congregation organized in 1942 by Puerto Rican Presbyterians on 172nd Street and Audubon Avenue. Other Protestant churches which changed from a European American to a mostly Caribbean-American congregation in the later part of the 20th century include the landmarked Holyrood Episcopal Church and Iglesia Adventista del Séptimo Dia (a Seventh-day Adventist church).

With the exception of Our Lady of Esperanza Church, which was built in Audubon Terrace as New York's second Spanish-language Catholic church, the neighborhood's Catholic churches served its large Irish population during the early 1900s. Church of the Incarnation and St. Elizabeth Church both started Catholic schools, which began to serve more and more Dominicans as the Irish moved to the suburbs.

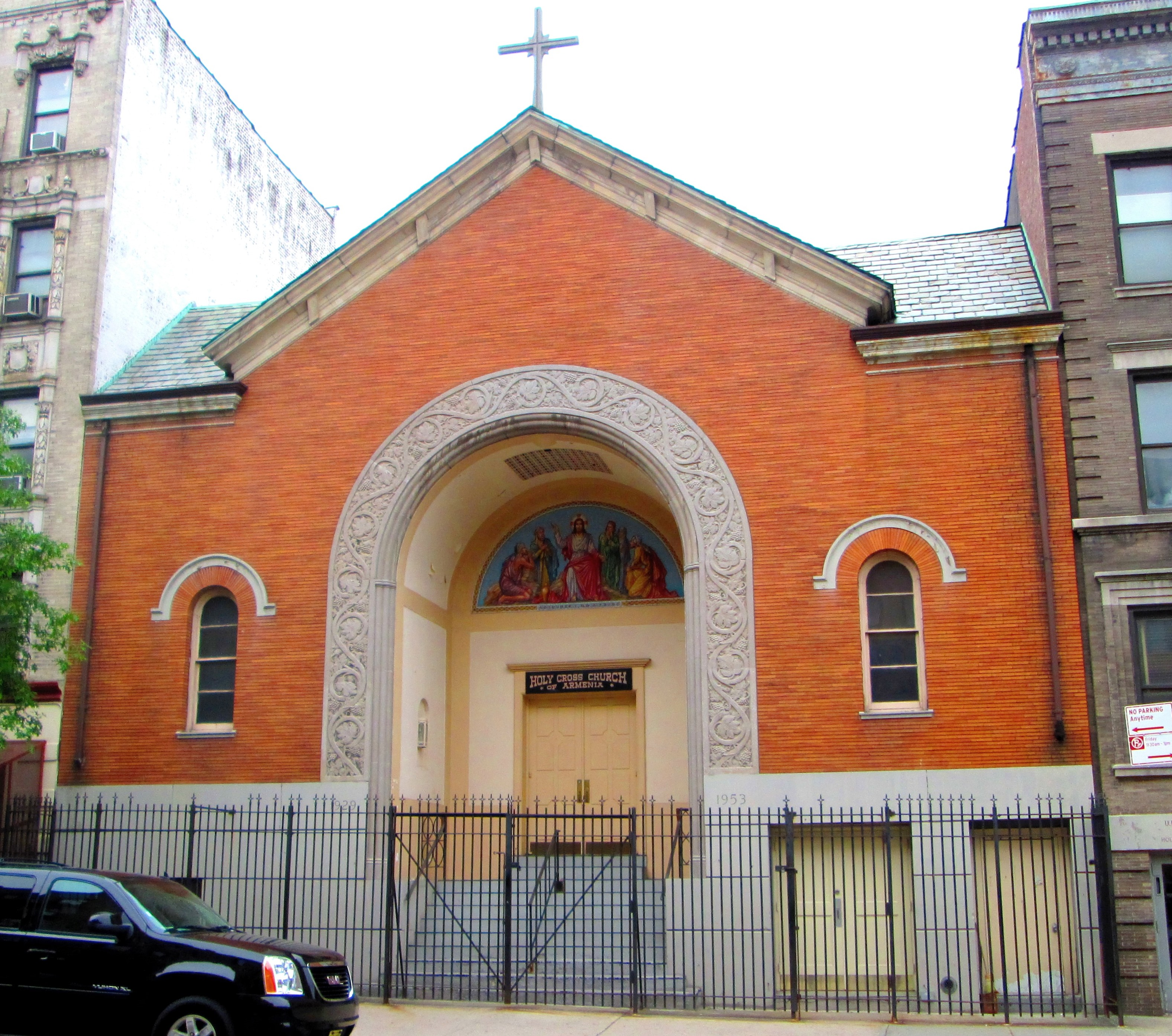
Holy Cross Armenian Apostolic Church

Other Christian denominations have a smaller but significant presence in Washington Heights, such as Baptist churches and Greek Orthodox churches (most notably St. Spyridon). Also of note is the Holy Cross Armenian Apostolic Church, where, in 1933, members of the Armenian Revolutionary Federation assassinated Eastern Diocese Archbishop Levon Tourian as he walked down its halls, after which the church needed to be reconsecrated.

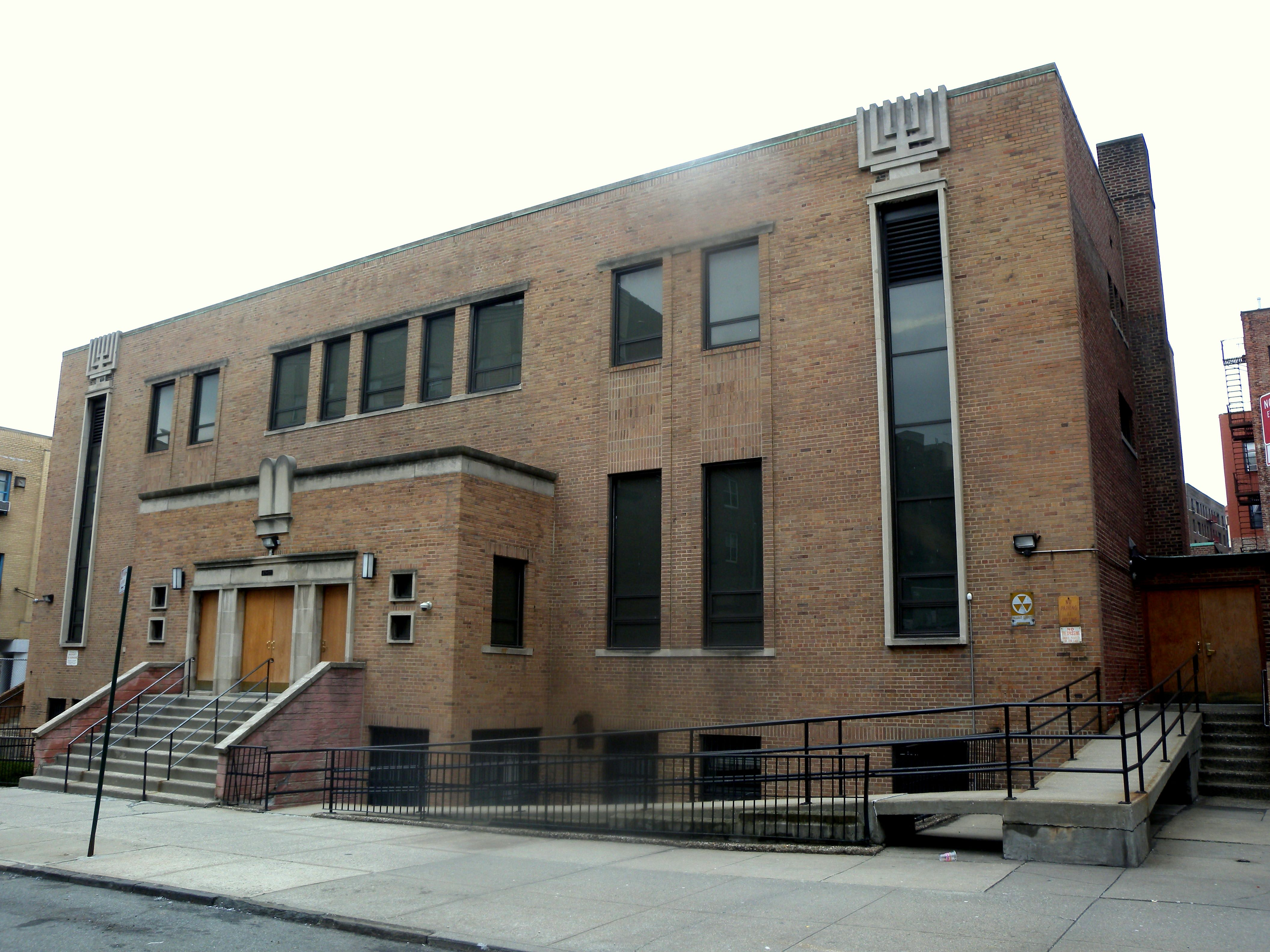
Khal Adath Jeshurun Orthodox synagogue.

Washington Heights' many Jewish institutions underwent significant change throughout the 20th century, with many of their locations in the southern part of the neighborhood being sold to Christian congregations as they closed or moved to more northern areas, where a significant population of Jewish people remained after the white flight of the 1960s and 1970s. Some Jewish congregations were founded by German Jewish immigrants during their flight from Nazi persecution in the 1930s and 1940s, such as the Conservative Fort Tryon Jewish Center, while others predate it, such as the Orthodox Mount Sinai Jewish Center. Khal Adath Jeshurun is an Orthodox congregation started by Rabbi Joseph Breuer in New York City, a continuation of his father's Jewish community in Frankfurt am Main, Germany, which includes the Yeshiva Rabbi Samson Raphael Hirsch as a parochial school.

=== Arts ===
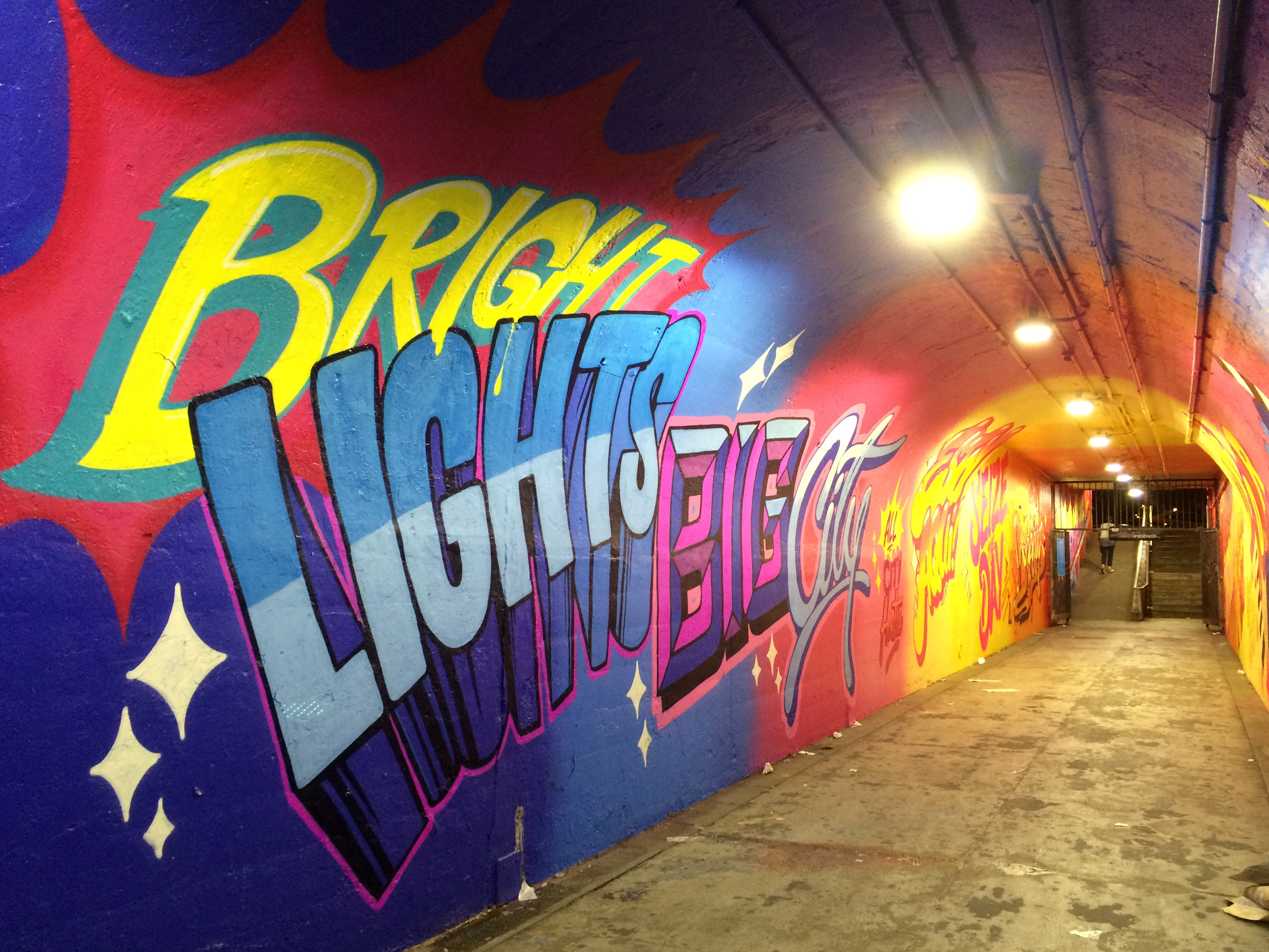
In 2015, the Northern Manhattan Arts Alliance and the Department of Transportation arranged with graffiti artists such as Cope2 to repaint the 191st Street subway tunnel.

Washington Heights, along with other parts of the city such as the Bronx, had a significant role in the early history of graffiti in New York City. In 1971, TAKI 183 (born on 183rd Street) was the first graffiti tagger to be exposed to the broader public through a profile in The New York Times; 188th Street and Audubon Avenue has also been cited as a location where graffiti writers exchanged names and ideas in the 1970s.

The Northern Manhattan Arts Alliance, founded in 2007 to support local artists, organizes the annual Uptown Arts Stroll, which features artists from Upper Manhattan in public locations for several weeks each summer.

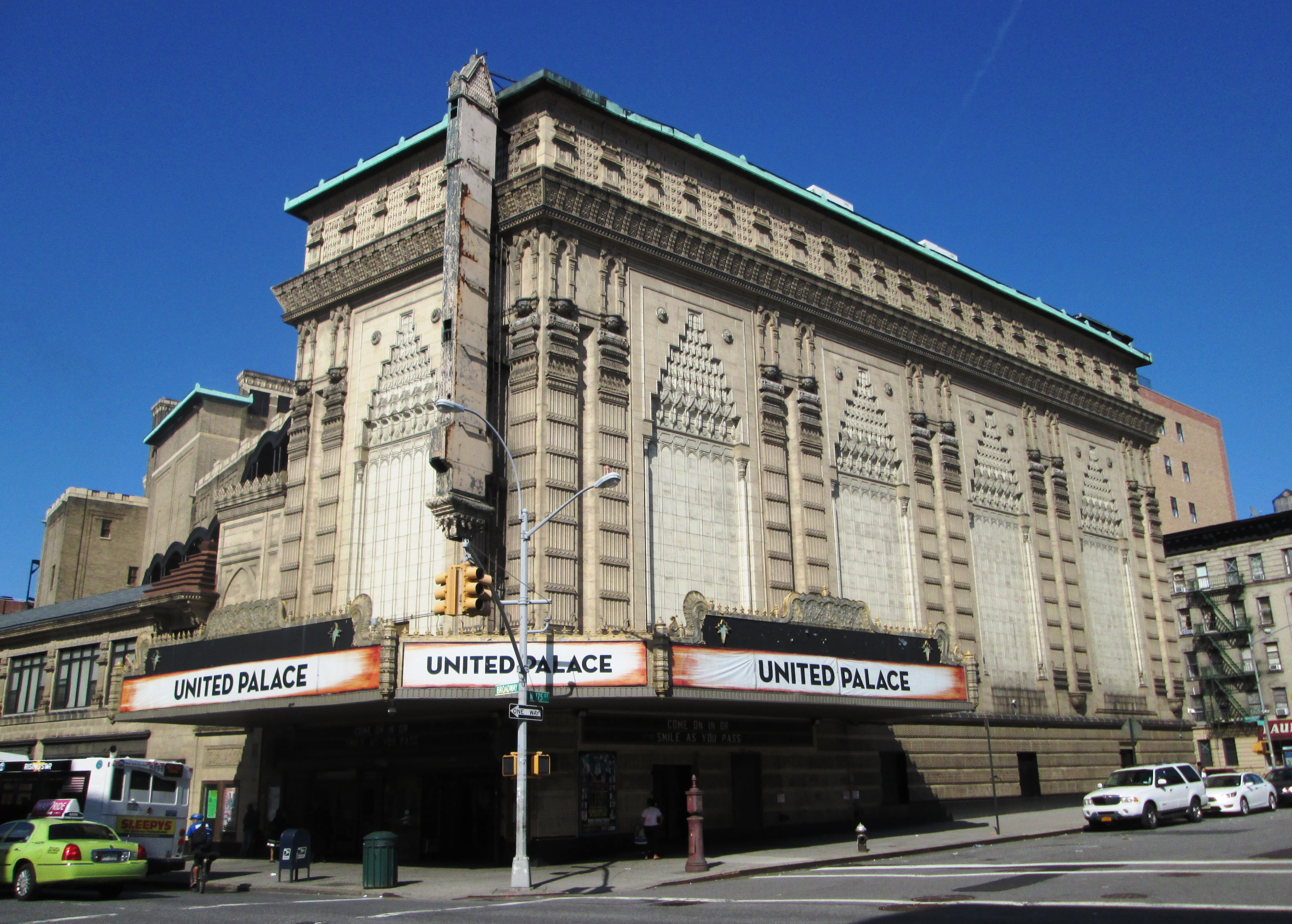
United Palace Theater

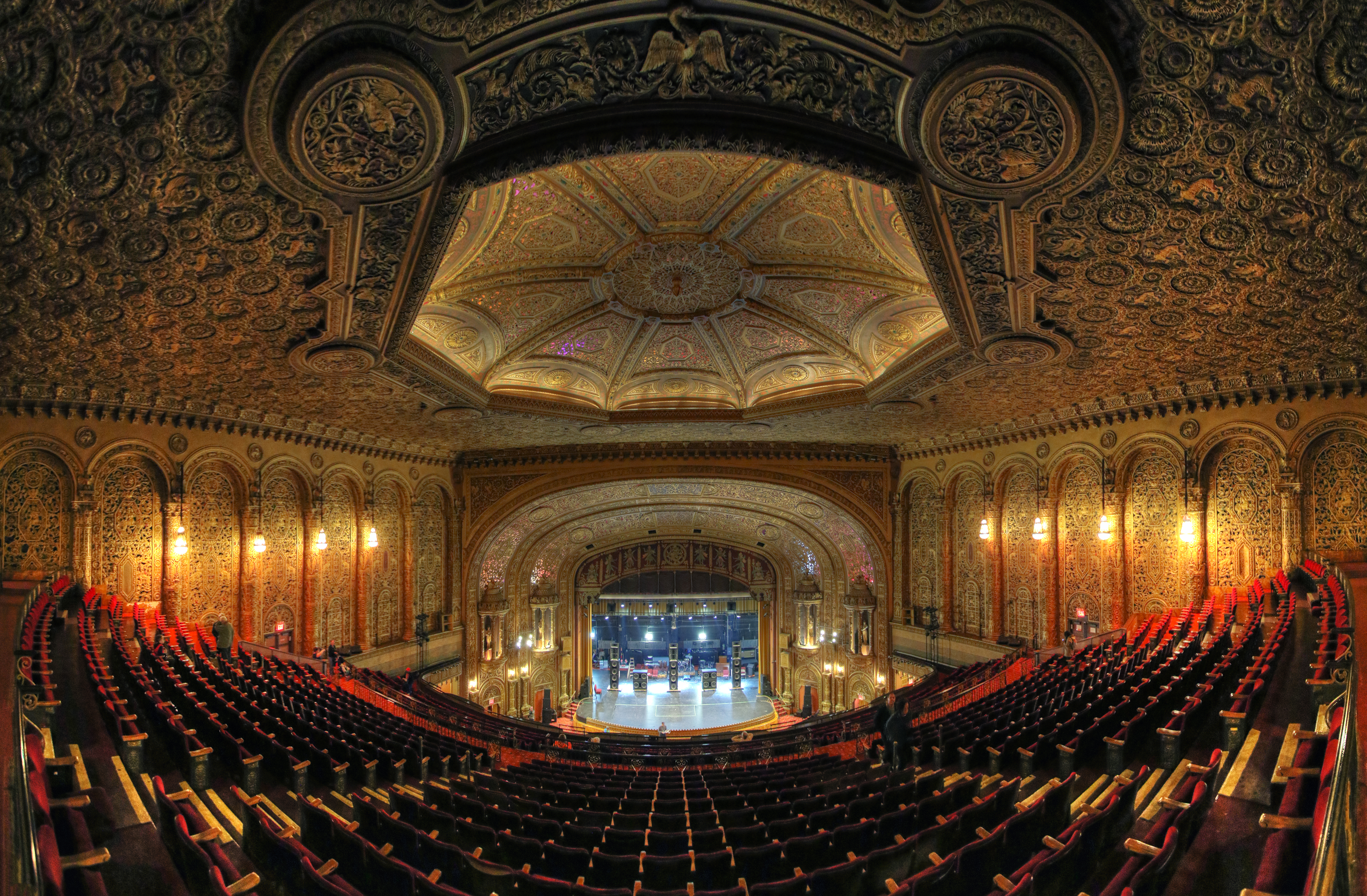
The United Palace theater interior.

The United Palace, a landmarked theater built in 1930, continues as a space for film and live performance in the present day, having featured musicians such as John Legend, Bob Dylan, Lenny Kravitz, and Lauryn Hill. Also noteworthy is UP Theater Company, a Washington Heights- and Inwood-based company established in 2010 that performs original plays in the neighborhood.

Washington Heights has also become the setting for creative works such as Lin-Manuel Miranda's Broadway musical and film In the Heights, Angie Cruz's novels Soledad and Dominicana, and the Amazon tv series The Horror of Dolores Roach.

== Sports ==
=== Historic ===
Five clubs in American professional sports have played in the Washington Heights area: the New York Giants, New York Mets, and New York Yankees baseball teams, and the New York Giants and New York Jets football teams.

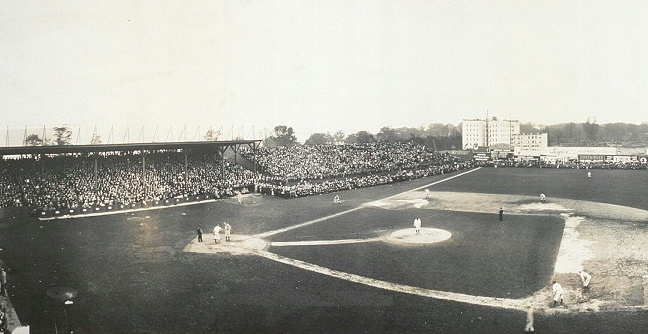
Hilltop Park during a 1903 game

Before the Yankees played at the Polo Grounds, they played at Hilltop Park on Broadway between 165th Street and 168th Street from 1903 to 1912; at the time, they were known as the New York Highlanders. On May 15, 1912, after being heckled crudely for several innings, then-Detroit Tigers player, and future Hall of Famer, Ty Cobb leaped into the stands and attacked his tormentor. He was suspended indefinitely by league president Ban Johnson, but his suspension was eventually reduced to 10 days, and fined $50 ($1,700 in current dollar terms). A historically outstanding pitching performance took place at Hilltop Park in September 1908, when 20-year-old Washington Senators hurler Walter Johnson shut out the Highlanders in three consecutive games. In 1928, the park became the Columbia University Medical Center, a major hospital complex.

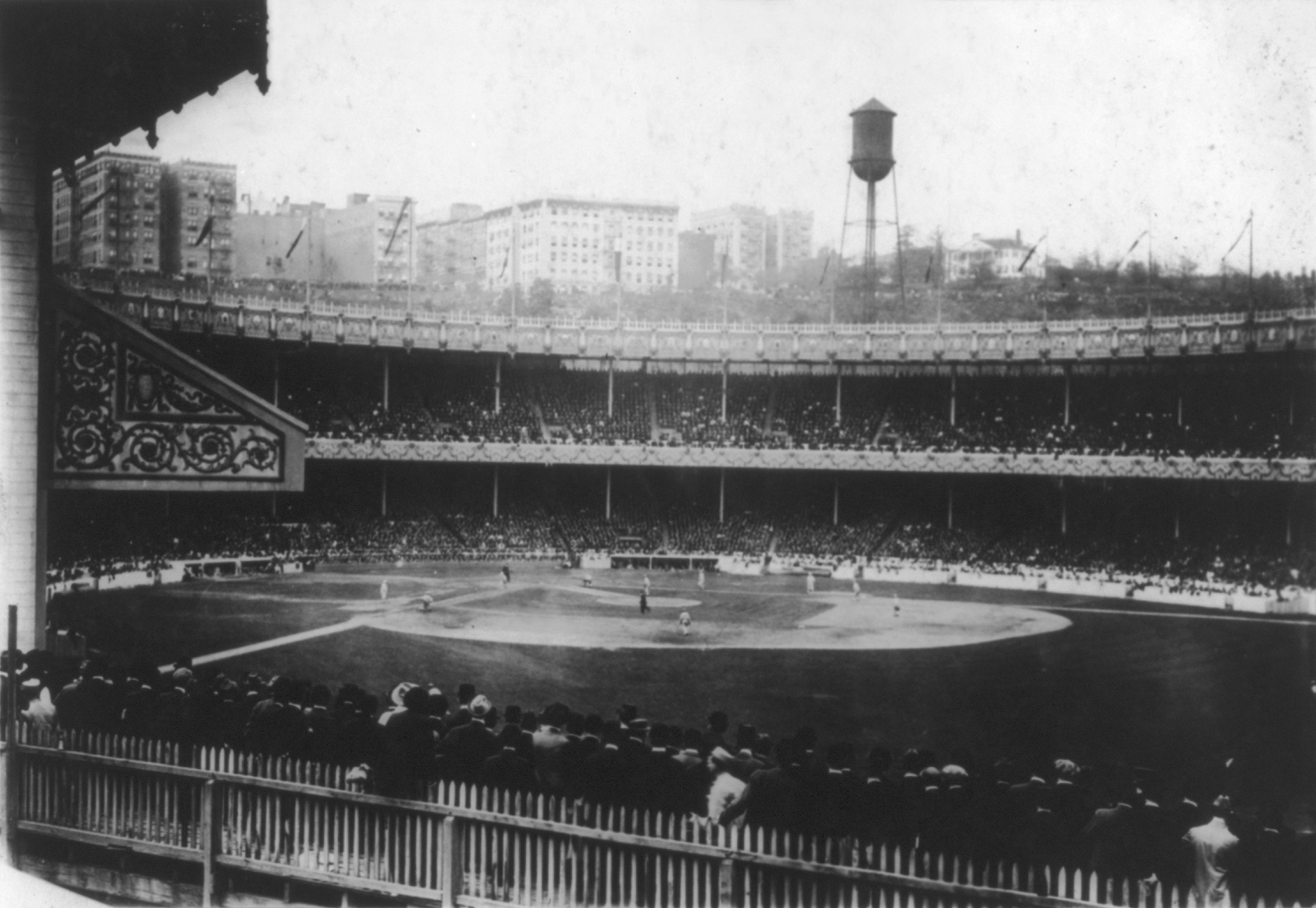
The Polo Grounds, during the 1913 World Series.

Situated on Coogan's Hollow, where the present-day Polo Grounds Towers are located, the Polo Grounds were the home field of three professional baseball teams, the baseball Giants (from 1911 to 1957), the Yankees (from 1912 to 1923), the Mets (from 1962 to 1963), and two professional football teams, the New York Giants (from 1925 to 1955) and the New York Jets (from 1960 to 1963). The Mets and Jets both began play at the Polo Grounds while their future home, Shea Stadium in Queens, was under construction.

The Polo Grounds was where Cleveland Indians shortstop Ray Chapman died in 1920, after being hit in the head by a pitch from Yankees pitcher Carl Mays.

Washington Heights has been the childhood residence of many baseball stars. The New York Yankees' Hall of Famer Lou Gehrig grew up in the neighborhood after moving out of Yorkville, Manhattan with his family, attending PS 132 during the 1910s. Hall of Famer Rod Carew and Manny Ramírez were two famous players who immigrated to the neighborhood as teenagers and attended George Washington High School (Carew during the 1960s, and Ramírez during the 1980s). Yankee star Alex Rodriguez was born in the neighborhood to Dominican parents. Legendary baseball broadcaster Vin Scully also grew up in the Washington Heights.

=== Modern ===
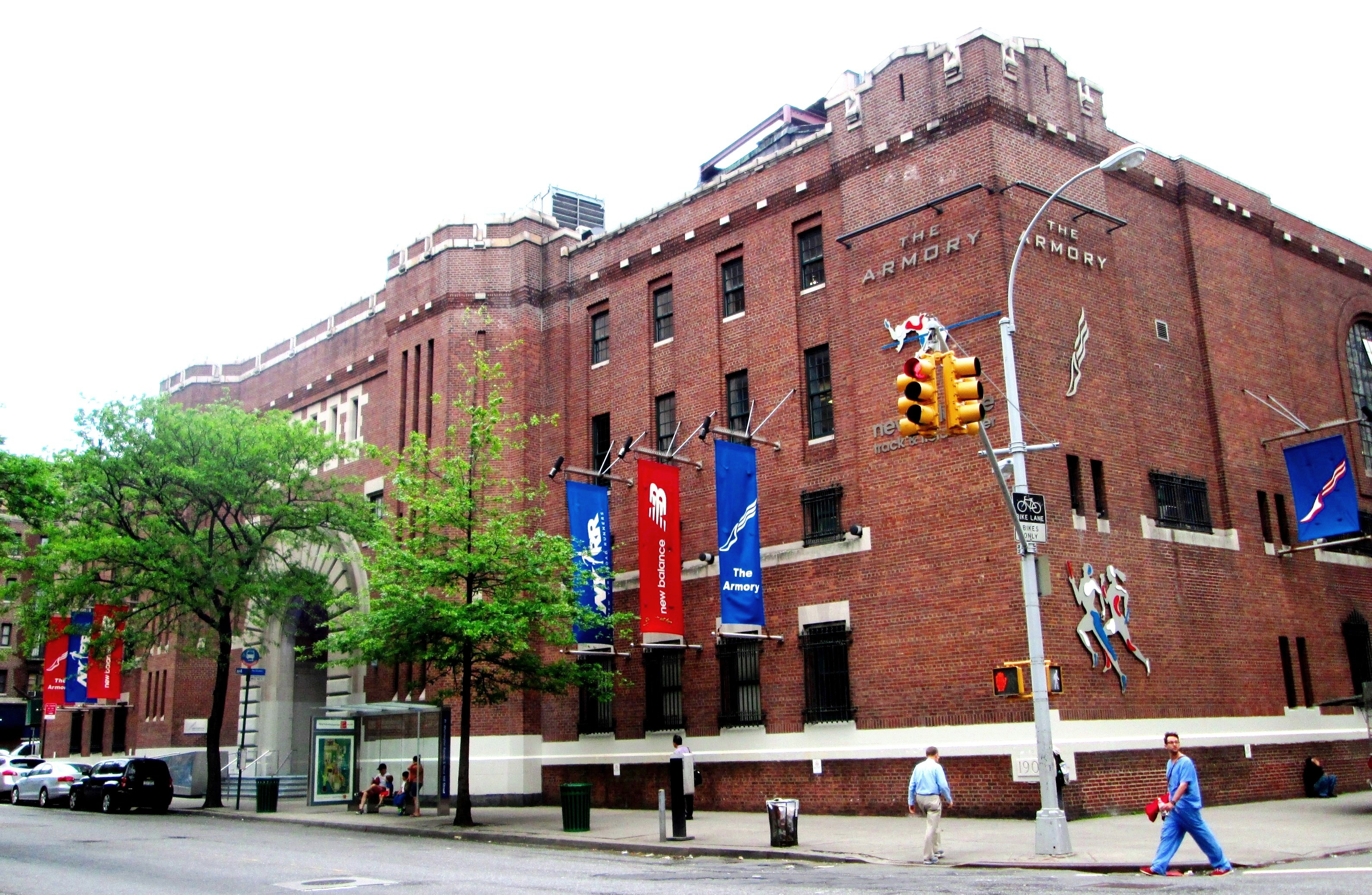
Fort Washington Avenue Armory

The New Balance Track and Field Center, located in the Fort Washington Avenue Armory, maintains an Olympic-caliber track that is one of the fastest in the world. Starting in January 2012, the Millrose Games have been held there, after having been held at the second, third, and current Madison Square Gardens from 1914 to 2011. To encourage physical activity and healthy eating, a partnership of local politicians, schools, and community organizers have organized the annual "Uptown Games" for children grades 1 to 8 at the Armory. Also at the Armory is the National Track and Field Hall of Fame, along with the Charles B. Rangel Technology & Learning Center for middle- and high-school students; the facility is operated by the Armory Foundation, which was created in 1993. The Armory is the starting point for the annual Washington Heights Salsa, Blues, and Shamrocks 5K, founded in 1999 by Peter M. Walsh of Coogan's Restaurant but now run by the New York Road Runners.

== Parks and recreation ==
Washington Heights and Inwood collectively have over 500 acres (200 ha) of parkland, representing over a third of the neighborhoods' total area.

=== Fort Washington Park ===
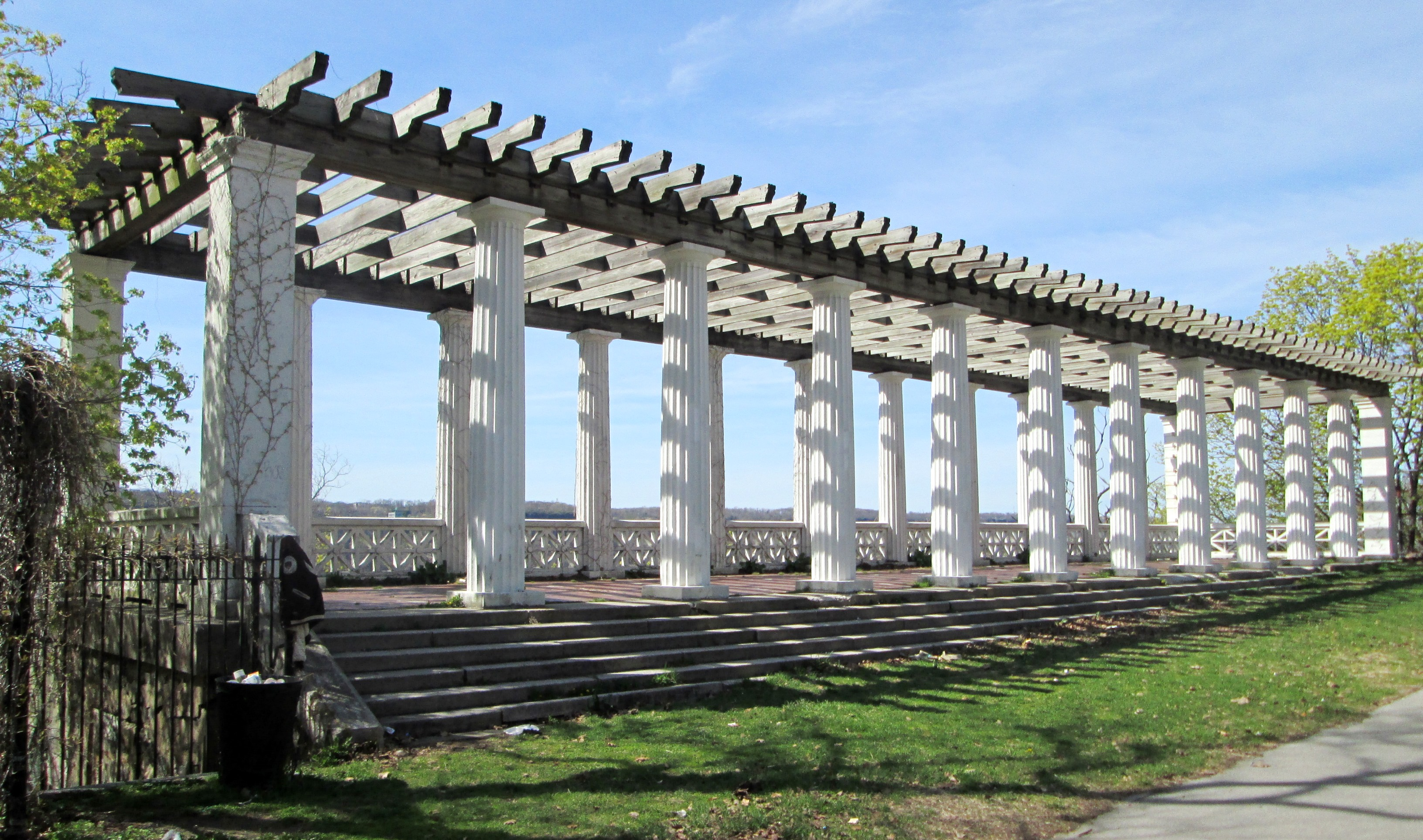
Next to the Hudson River Greenway, Inspiration Point was once a popular rest stop for pedestrians and motorists.

Washington Heights' Fort Washington Park runs from 155th Street to Dyckman Street along the Hudson River, meeting the George Washington Bridge at Jeffrey's Hook (around 178th Street). The 184-acre park was originally designed in 1873 by Fredrick Law Olmsted along with Riverside Park and Morningside Park, and most of the park was acquired via eminent domain between 1896 and 1927. Although it was initially connected with Fort Tryon Park to the east (a condition for John D. Rockefeller Jr.'s donation of the Fort Tryon parkland), the 1937 construction of the Henry Hudson Parkway separated the two parks.

Sitting just underneath the George Washington Bridge is the Little Red Lighthouse, which was originally built in 1917 in Sandy Hook, New Jersey before being moved to aid with navigation in the Hudson River during the 1920s. After the George Washington Bridge opened in 1931, the lighthouse became obsolete, and the United States Coast Guard began planning to dismantle and auction it. After a public outcry, contributed to by Hildegarde Swift's popular children's book The Little Red Lighthouse and the Great Gray Bridge, the lighthouse was instead given to the city government in 1951. Having undergone renovation in 1986 and again in 2000, the lighthouse is available for tours as of 2021 and is honored in the annual Little Red Lighthouse Festival.

=== Fort Tryon Park ===
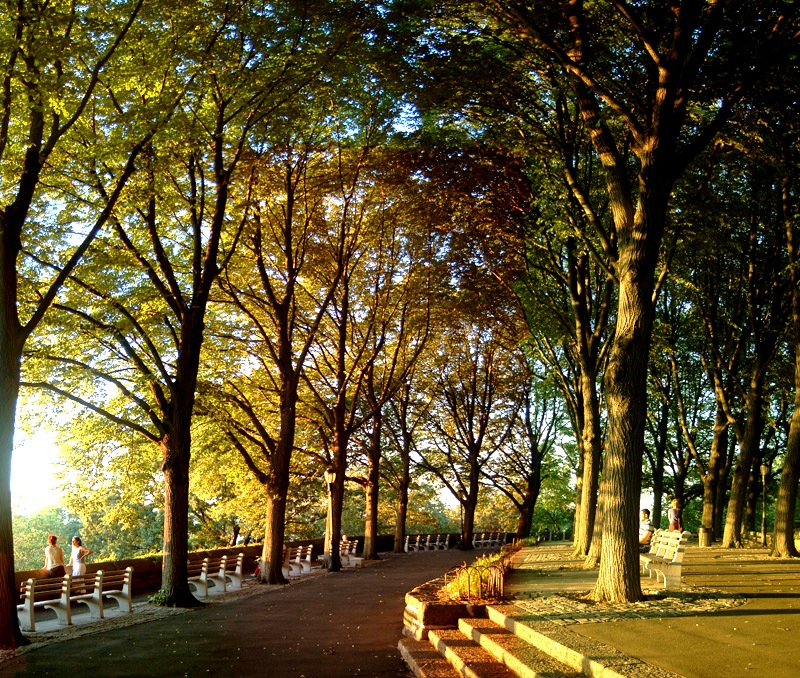
Linden Terrace in Fort Tryon Park

Occupying a 67-acre area south of Inwood Hill Park between Broadway and the Henry Hudson Parkway, Fort Tryon Park's history began with John D. Rockefeller Jr.'s purchase of the Hays, Shaefer, Libbey, and Billings estates in 1917 for $2 million (equivalent to $50.3 million in 2025). Rockefeller hired Frederick Law Olmsted Jr. (the son of Fort Washington Park's planner) to design the park in 1927, and in 1931 Mayor James Walker accepted his donation of the parkland, to be developed primarily at Rockefeller's expense. Opening in 1935, the park's picturesque views of the Palisades across the Hudson River were maintained by another Rockefeller purchase there with the aim of preventing construction, preserved as part of Palisades Interstate Park.

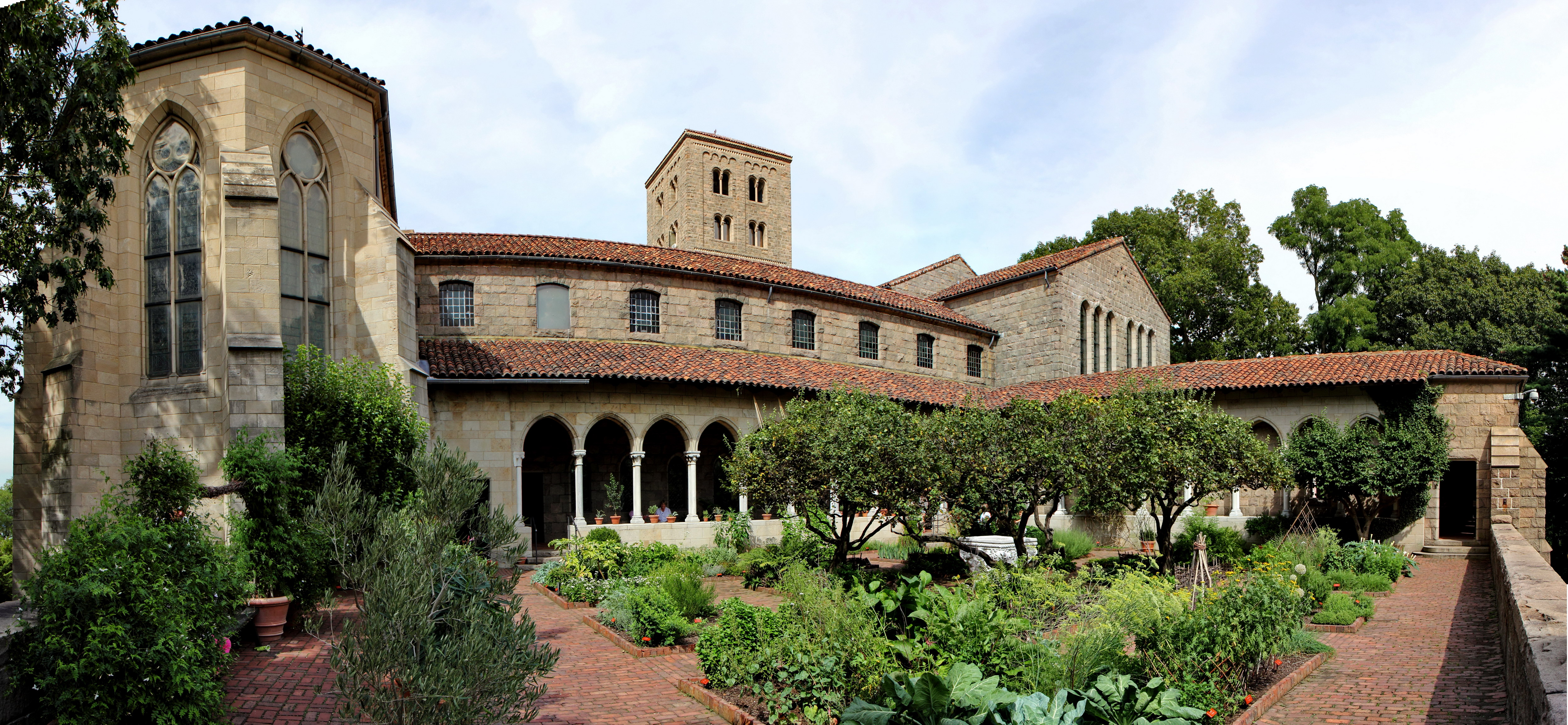
The Cloisters

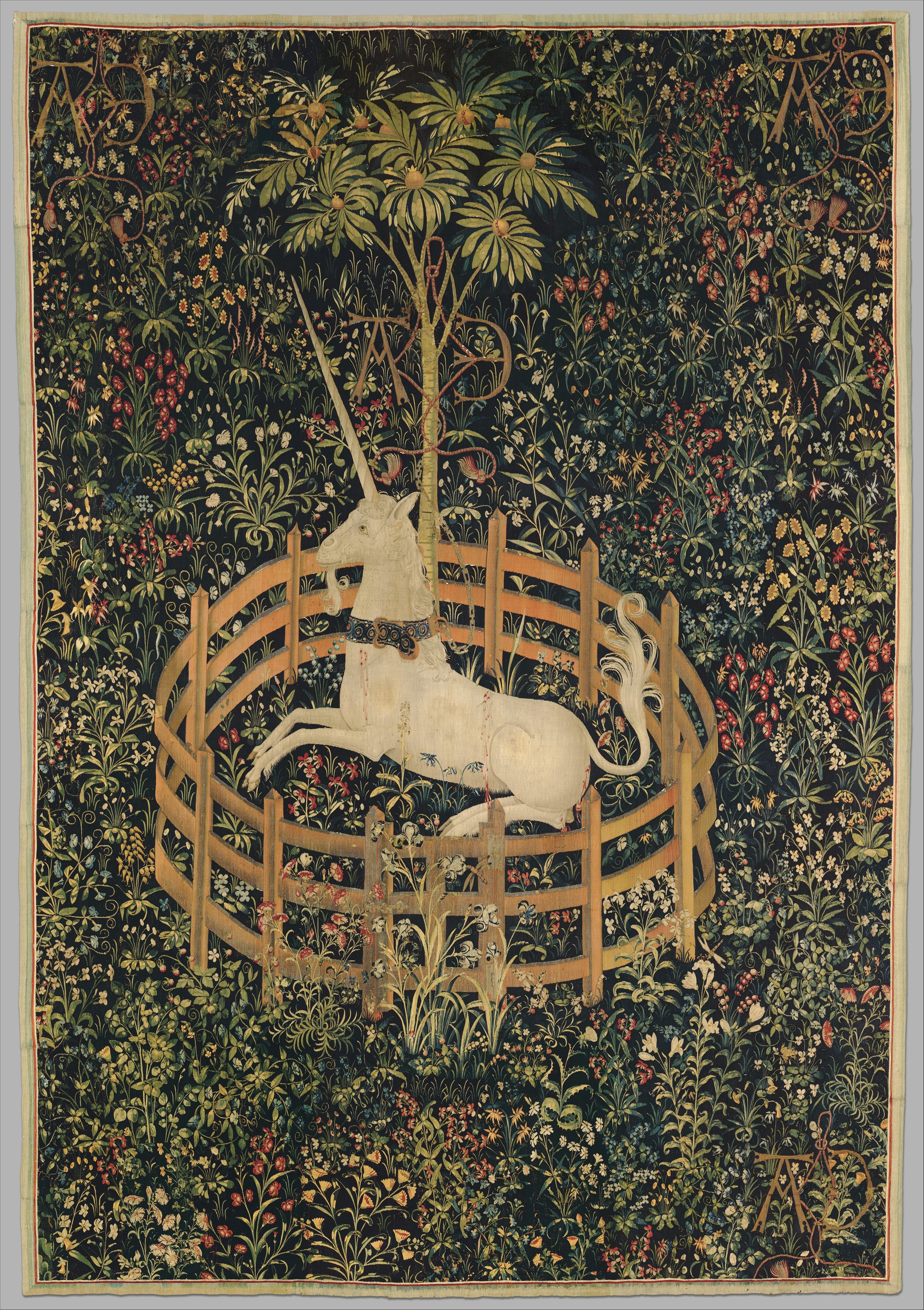
The Unicorn in Captivity, in the Cloisters

As part of his Fort Tryon donation, Rockefeller reserved 4 acres (1.6 ha) in the center of the park for the Metropolitan Museum of Art to develop the Cloisters. The original Cloisters museum, a collection of medieval art owned by sculptor George Grey Barnard and located on upper Fort Washington Avenue, was purchased by the Metropolitan with Rockefeller funds in 1925. After Fort Tryon Park's opening in 1935, construction began for the new Cloisters building using elements shipped from abbeys in southern France and Catalonia, based on designs by Charles Collens. Added to the National Register of Historic Places in 1978, the museum has a vast collection of Romanesque and Gothic art, including the Hunt of the Unicorn tapestries, purchased by Rockefeller for $1 million in 1922.

One of Fort Tryon Park's biggest annual events is the Medieval Festival, a collaboration between the Parks Department and the Washington Heights and Inwood Development Corporation that has taken place at the park since 1983. The event is free, relying on a mix of private and public sponsors as well as donations, and draws an average of 60,000 people for an afternoon of medieval-themed arts, activities, and food.

=== Highbridge Park ===
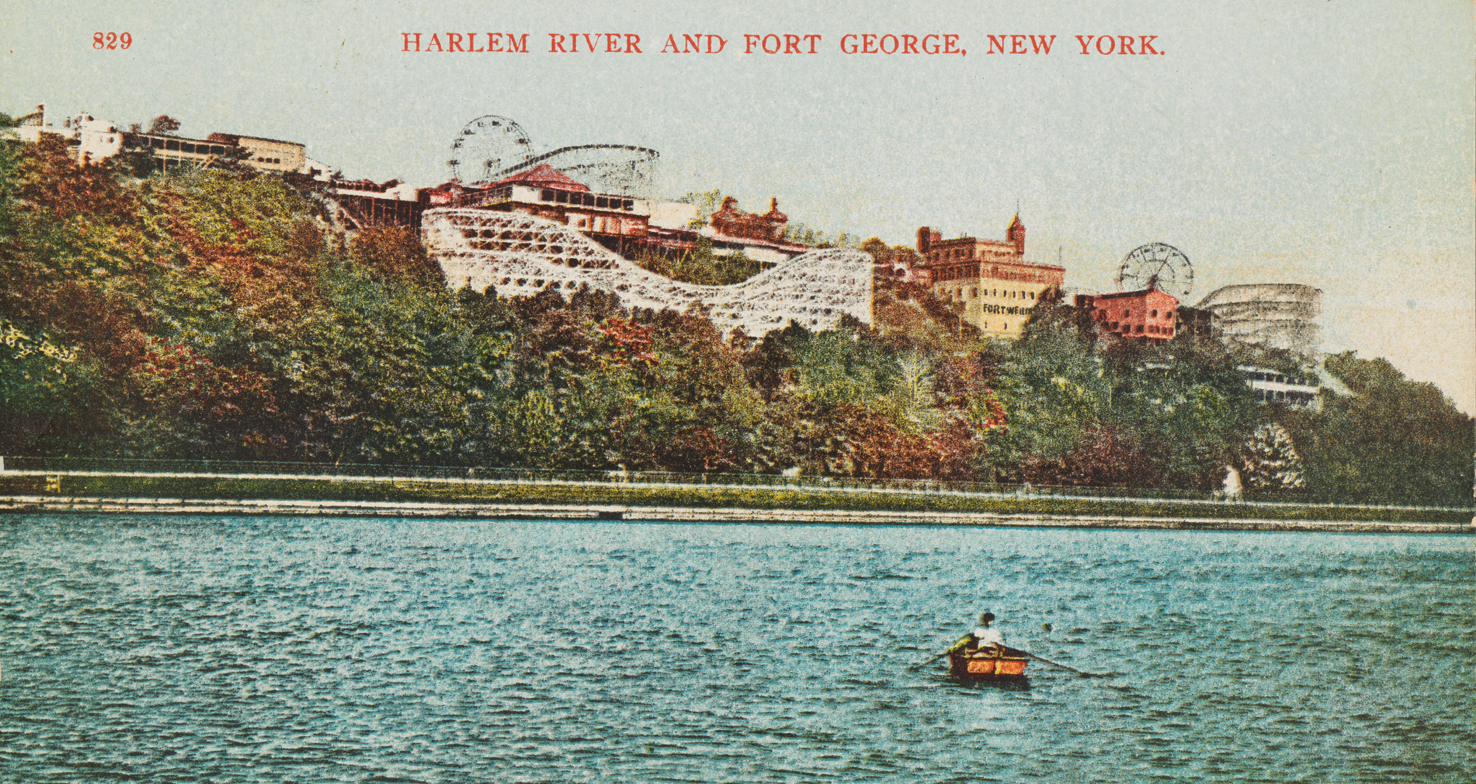
A 1905 postcard of Fort George Amusement Park, as seen from the Harlem River

Highbridge Park, a 160-acre park with heavily wooded areas and views of the Harlem River, lies on Washington Heights' western cliffside from 155th Street to Dyckman Street, cut off from the waterfront by the Harlem River Drive. Unlike Washington Heights' other major parks, Highbridge had no prior design but was assembled piecemeal by the city through condemnation, the majority being acquired from 1895 to 1901. In the park's southern extreme lies Coogan's Bluff, which, during the time of the Polo Grounds, offered a vantage point for watching baseball games without paying for tickets. The park's northernmost Fort George Hill section was gained through the condemnation of Fort George Amusement Park, a trolley park built in 1895 that was burned twice by 1913. In 2007, the Parks Department collaborated with the New York City Mountain Bike Association to open a network of mountain bike trails in this section of the park.

Highbridge Park is home to three New York City landmarks: its namesake the High Bridge, the High Bridge Water Tower, and the Highbridge Play Center. The High Bridge, New York City's oldest remaining bridge, was built in 1848 as part of the Croton Aqueduct system connecting the Bronx to Manhattan at 174th Street and, since 2015, has been active as a bridge for pedestrians and cyclists. The bridge's accompanying water tower was also an integral part of New York City's water system until 1949. Built on a former reservoir in front of the High Bridge Water Tower, the Highbridge Play Center is best known for its swimming pool, one of many Works Progress Administration-funded outdoor pools opened in the summer of 1936.

=== Other parks ===
Washington Heights is also home to the following smaller parks:

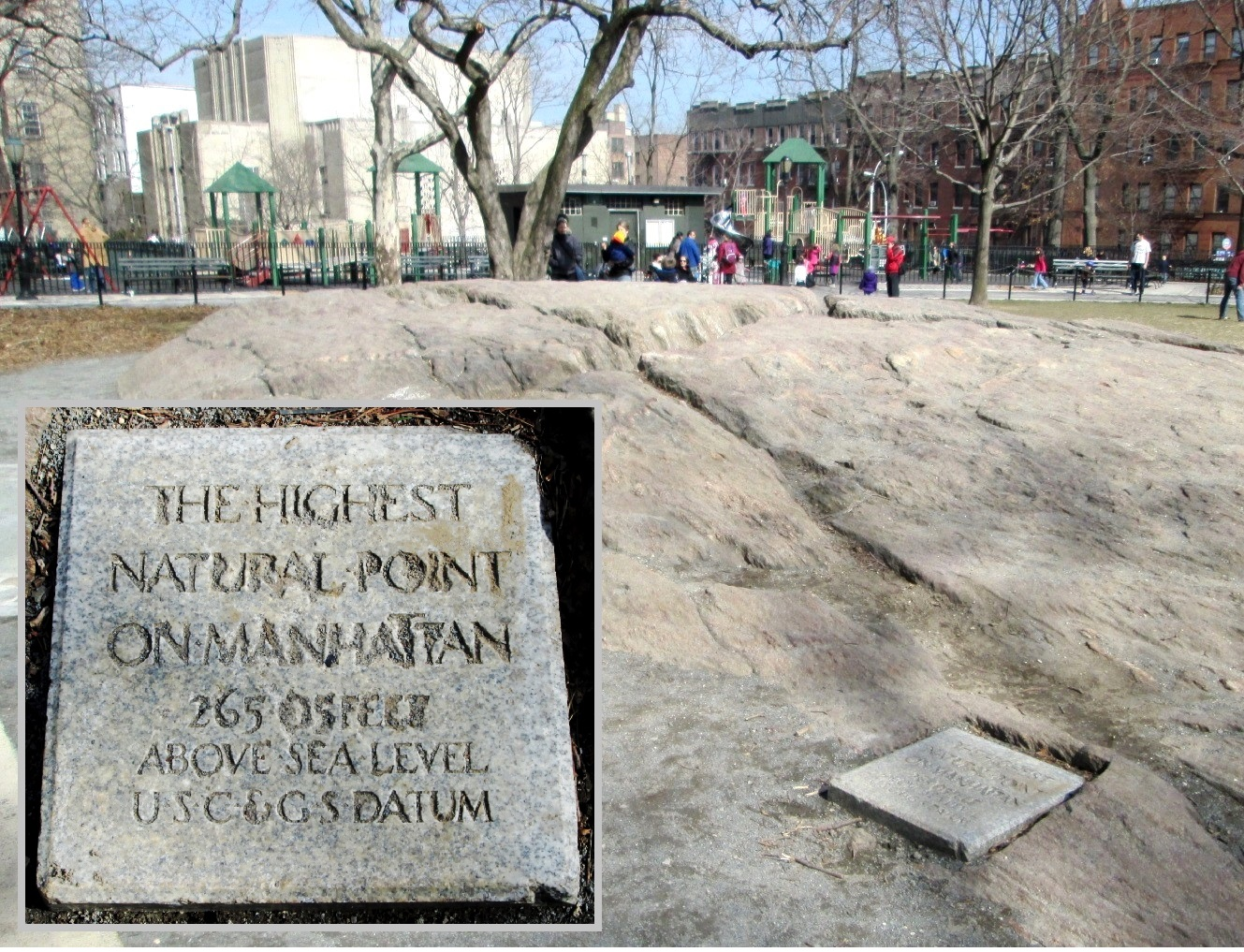
The highest natural point on Manhattan is Bennett Park; the inset at the bottom left magnifies the plaque at right.

- Bennett Park – 1.8-acre (0.73 ha) park; location of the highest natural point in Manhattan
- J. Hood Wright Park – 6.7 acres (2.7 ha) park includes a playground
- Mitchel Square Park – small urban park; site of the Washington Heights and Inwood World War I memorial by Gertrude Vanderbilt Whitney
- Amelia Gorman Park – 1.89-acre (0.76 ha) park; lower section and descending winding path closed for retaining wall repairs since 2017, except upper plaza (as of June 2026)
- McKenna Square – 0.24-acre public green space

== Landmarks and attractions ==
=== National Register of Historic Places ===
- Dominican Historic District
- U.S. National Register of Historic Places
- U.S. Historic district
- New York State Register of Historic Places
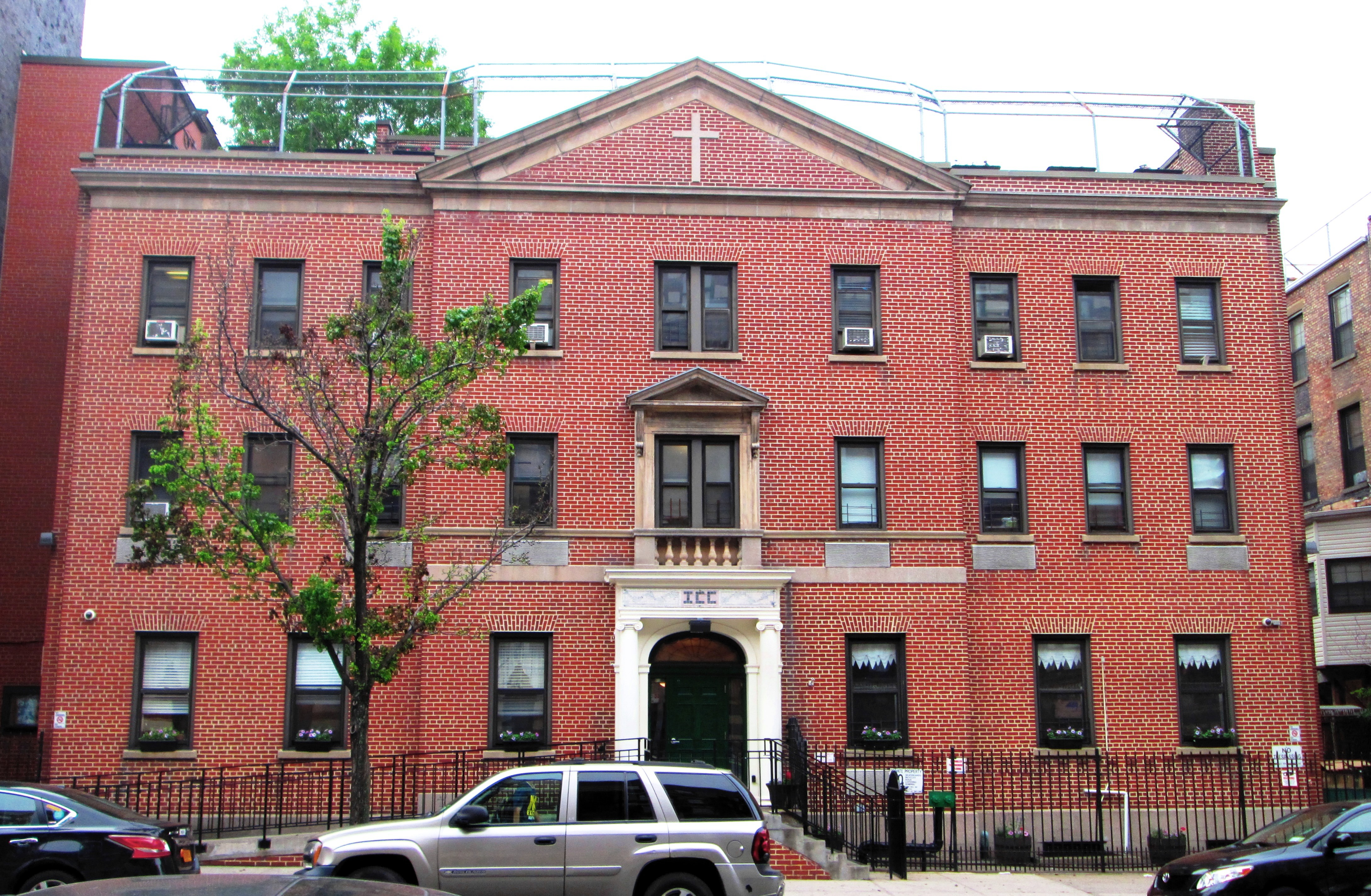
- Incarnation Children's Center, a contributing property in the Dominican Historic District

- Location within New York City Location within New York
- Location: Roughly W 155th St., Broadway, Dyckman St., Harlem River Drive, Manhattan, New York
- Area: 593.69 acres (240.26 ha)
- Architect: Various
- NRHP reference No.: 100011048

Significant dates
- Added to NRHP: January 24, 2025
- Designated NYSRHP: December 16, 2024

In 2022, the City University of New York's Dominican Studies Institute proposed adding the Washington Heights-Dominican Cultural Historic District to the National Register of Historic Places (NRHP), running between 155th and 200th Streets. The New York State Board for Historic Preservation voted in September 2024 to recommend that the district be added to the NRHP, though many local residents opposed the designation because it excluded other ethnic groups. The Dominican Historic District was added to the NRHP in February 2025.

Audubon Terrace, a cluster of eight distinguished Beaux Arts and Renaissance Revival buildings constructed between 1904 and 1930, is located on Broadway between 155th and 156th Streets. Named for John James Audubon due to his land holdings in the Audubon Park Historic District, the complex was envisioned as a cultural center by its founder Archer Milton Huntington and almost entirely designed by his cousin architec Charles Pratt Huntington.

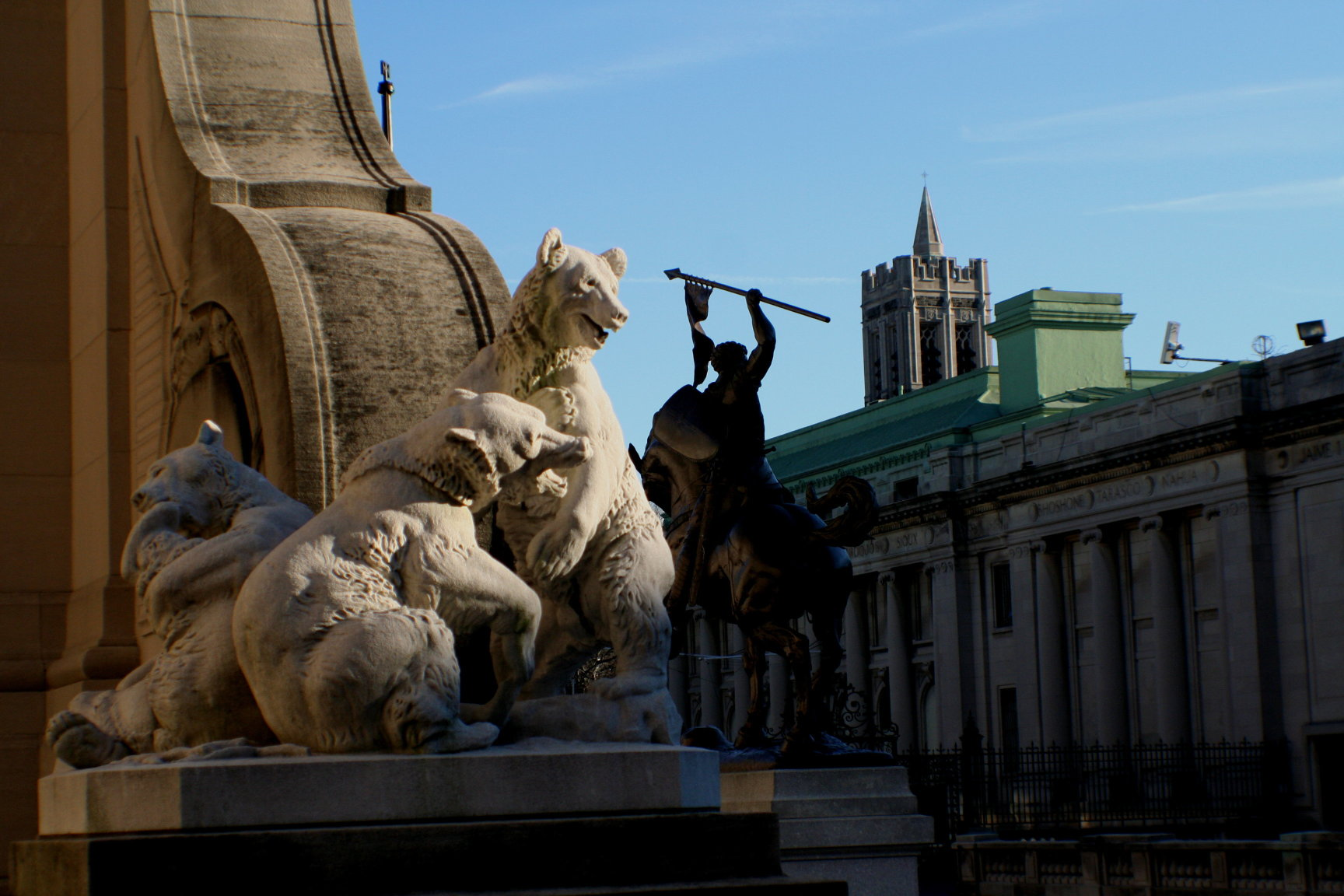
One of Audubon Terrace's courtyard details, with the Hispanic Society of America in the background

The Audubon Terrace is home to the Hispanic Society of America (also separately designated as a National Historic Landmark,), the American Academy of Arts and Letters, the Our Lady of Esperanza Church, and Boricua College. Despite their unique decor and expansive collections, its museums have long struggled with attracting visitors due to their non-central location; the American Geographical Society, the Heye Collection of the National Museum of the American Indian, and the American Numismatic Society all previously occupied Audubon Terrace but have since moved their collections elsewhere.

Overlooking Coogan's Bluff between 160th and 162nd Streets in the Jumel Terrace Historic District, the Morris–Jumel Mansion has the distinction of being Manhattan's oldest surviving house. Headquartered by George Washington in 1776 before being taken by the British and Hessians, the mansion was built in 1765 by British colonel Roger Morris and in 1810 became property of Eliza Jumel. Jumel became one of the wealthiest women in the city after the death of her husband Stephen in 1832, and she later was the wife of politician Aaron Burr until his death in 1836. Also a National Historic Landmark, the house is owned and maintained as a museum by the Parks Department. Hamilton playwright Lin-Manuel Miranda sat in Aaron Burr's room to write of many of the hit musical's songs.

The Paul Robeson Home, located on the corner of Edgecombe Avenue and 160th Street, is a National Historic Landmark building. Part of Washington Heights' historically black southeastern area, the building is known for its famous African-American residents, including actor Paul Robeson, musician Count Basie, and boxer Joe Louis.

=== Other sites ===
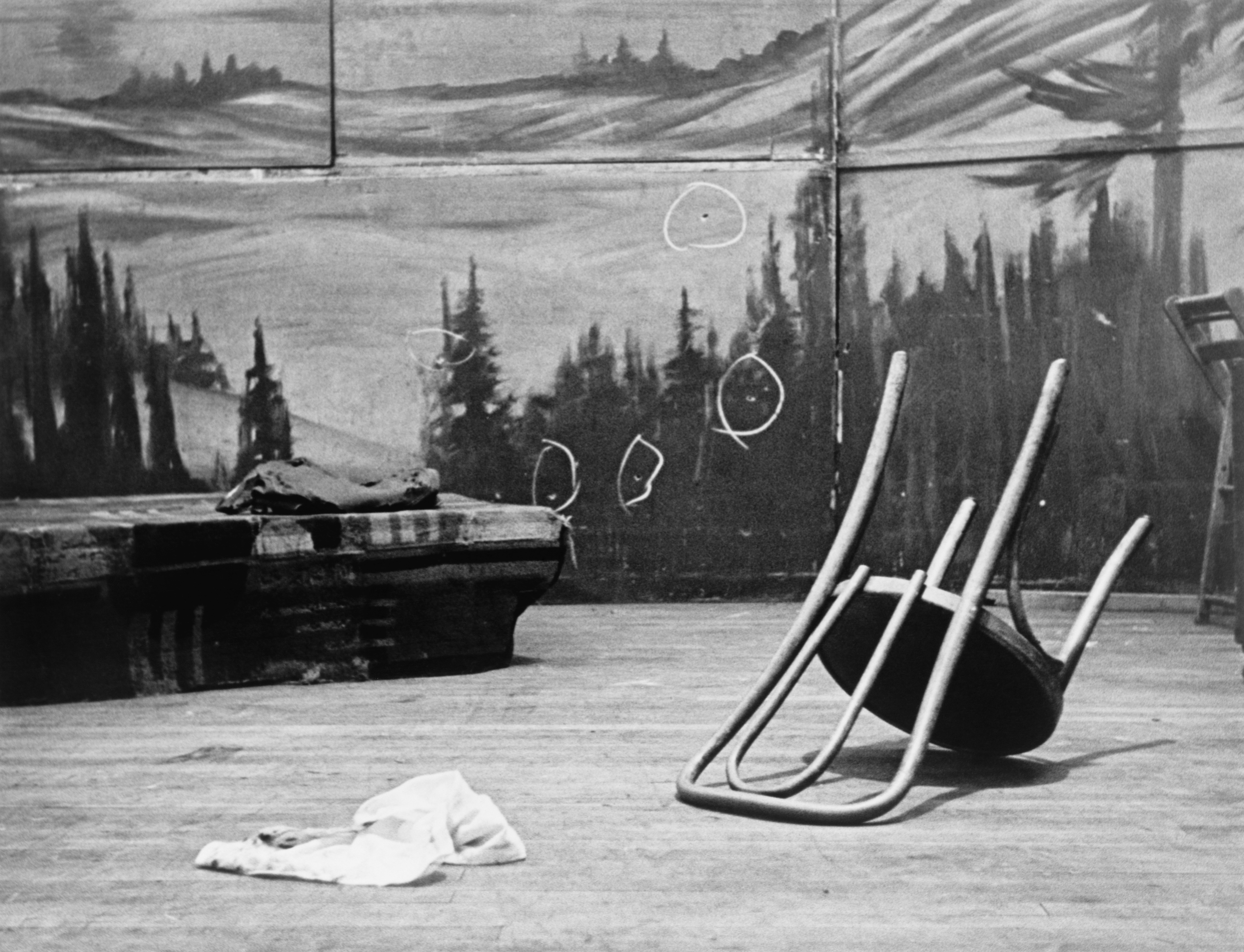
The site of Malcolm X's 1965 assassination in the Audubon Ballroom

The Audubon Ballroom was originally a vaudeville and movie theater, built by William Fox of the Fox Film Corporation on the corner of Broadway and 165th Street. Since the 1930s the theater had been used as a meeting space for unions and other organizations, and in the 1950s hosted the annual New York Mardi Gras festival. The building acquired its greatest historical significance on February 21, 1965, when Malcolm X was assassinated there during a rally of the Organization of Afro-American Unity. The theater was seized by the city for unpaid back taxes in 1967 and, in the late 1980s, was planned for demolition in order to build a medical research center for Columbia University. After pushback by community members and Columbia students, the university reached a compromise in 1990 to restore part of the original façade and ballroom. As of 2021, the building houses Columbia's Mary Woodard Lasker Biomedical Research Building, in addition to the Malcolm X and Dr. Betty Shabazz Memorial and Educational Center, which houses documents related to the life and work of the two civil rights activists.

The United Palace was built in 1930 as the Loew's 175th Street Theater, designed primarily by Thomas W. Lamb (the same architect of the Audubon Ballroom) and featuring interior design work by Harold Rambusch. Originally a theater, it was bought in 1969 by televangelist Reverend Ike and became a church for the United Church Science of Living Institute. Made a New York City landmark in 2016, the United Palace also acts as a cultural center, hosting films and live performances as of 2021.

The current NewYork–Presbyterian/Columbia University Medical Center occupies the former site of Hilltop Park, the home of the New York Highlanders – later the New York Yankees – from 1903 to 1912. Across the street is the Fort Washington Avenue Armory's New Balance Track and Field Center, an indoor track home to the National Track & Field Hall of Fame.

== Local newspaper ==
Manhattan Times is a free English/Spanish bilingual community newspaper serving Spanish-speaking areas of Upper Manhattan, including Washington Heights. It was founded in 1999 by Luís A. Miranda Jr., Roberto Ramírez Sr., and David Keisman. The newspaper features stories about news and events of interest to residents on the city and neighborhood level, and it is funded in part by private advertisements in addition to public service announcements.

== Police and crime ==
NYPD Precincts Serving Washington Heights

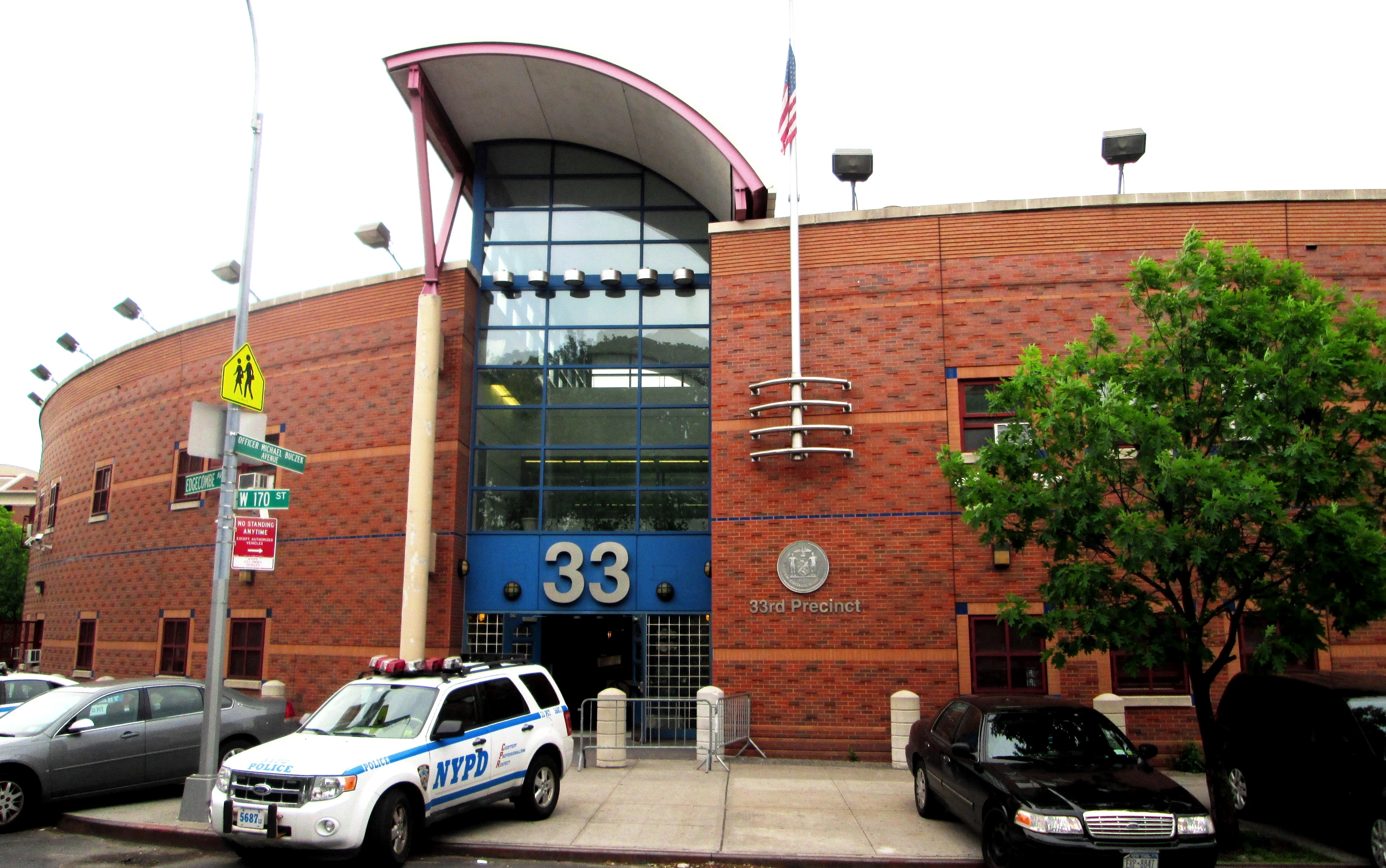
The 33rd Precinct, serving Washington Heights South

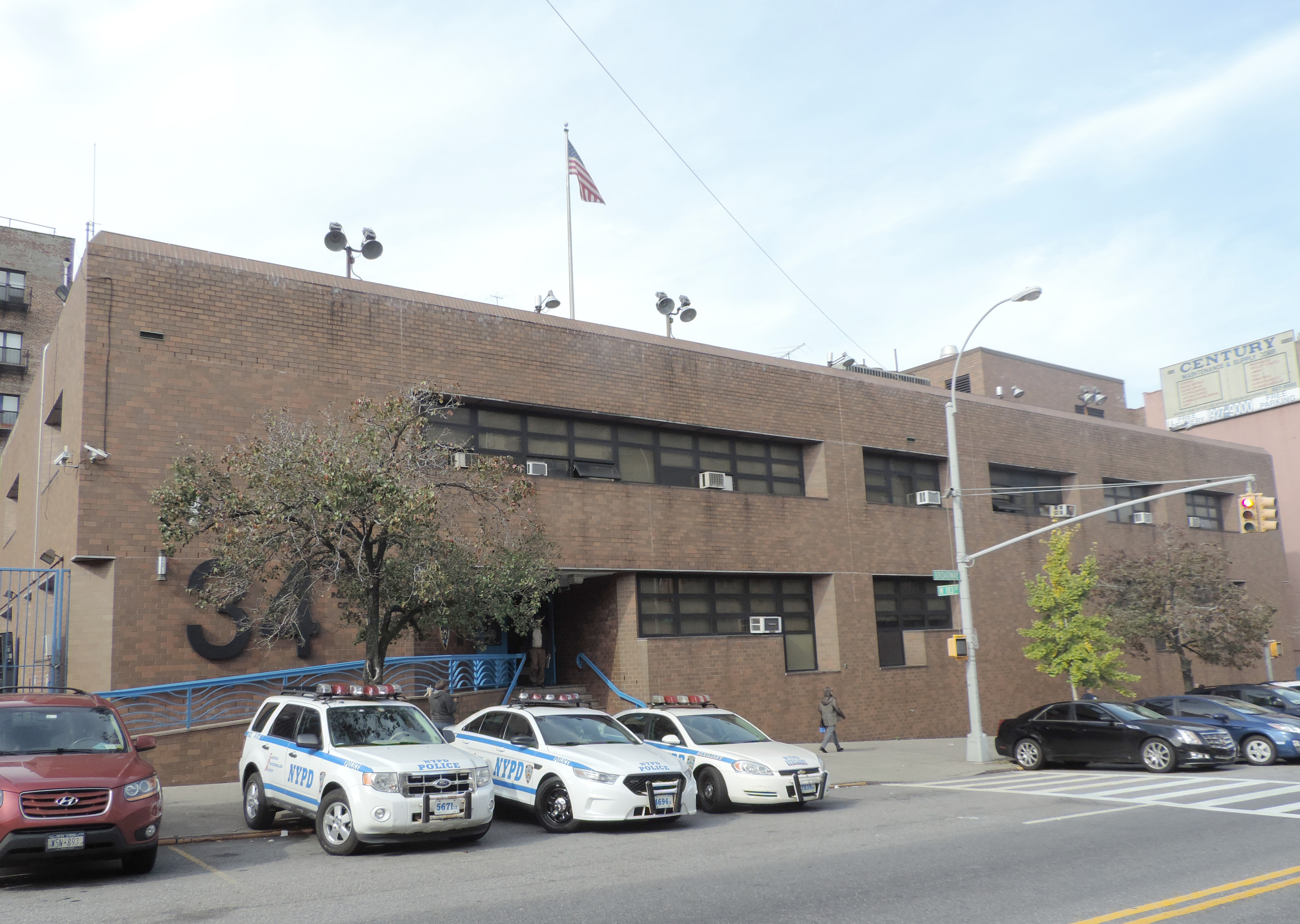
The 34th Precinct, serving Washington Heights North and Inwood

Washington Heights is served by two precincts of the NYPD. The area south of 179th Street is served by the 33rd Precinct, located at 2207 Amsterdam Avenue, while the 34th Precinct, located at 4295 Broadway, serves the north side of the neighborhood along with Inwood.

The precinct was split in 1994 to increase police presence in Washington Heights at a time of very high crime rates, but crime has fallen drastically since then. As of 2018, the neighborhood had a non-fatal assault hospitalization rate of 43 per 100,000 people (compared to 59 per 100,000 citywide) and an incarceration rate of 482 per 100,000 adults (425 per 100,000 citywide).

In 2023, the 34th Precinct reported four murders, 14 rapes, 215 robberies, 349 felony assaults, 151 burglaries, 575 grand larcenies, and 231 grand auto larcenies. The number of crimes committed in these categories fell by 30.2% between 1998 and 2023. In the same year, the 33rd Precinct reported eight murders, eight rapes, 177 robberies, 243 felony assaults, 115 burglaries, 359 grand larcenies, and 142 grand auto larcenies. The number of crimes committed in these categories fell by 36.8% between 1998 and 2023.

== Fire safety ==
Washington Heights is served by three New York City Fire Department (FDNY) fire stations:

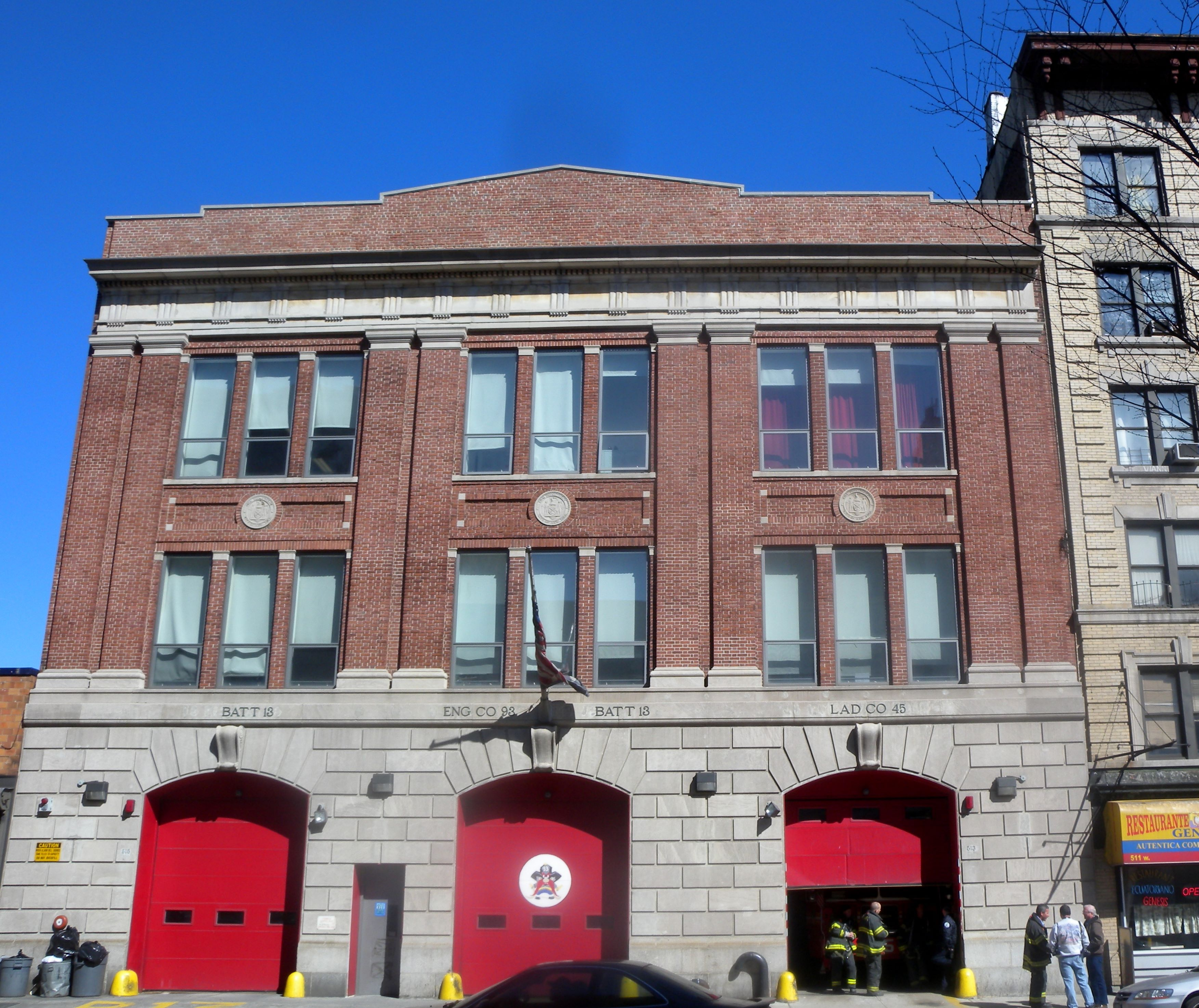
FDNY Engine Co. 93/Ladder Co. 45/Battalion 13

- Engine Company 67 – 518 West 170th Street (a New York City landmark)
- Engine Company 84/Ladder Company 34 – 513 West 161st Street (a New York City landmark)
- Engine Company 93/Ladder Company 45/Battalion 13 – 515 West 181st Street

In addition, FDNY EMS Station 13 is located at 501 West 172nd Street.

== Health ==
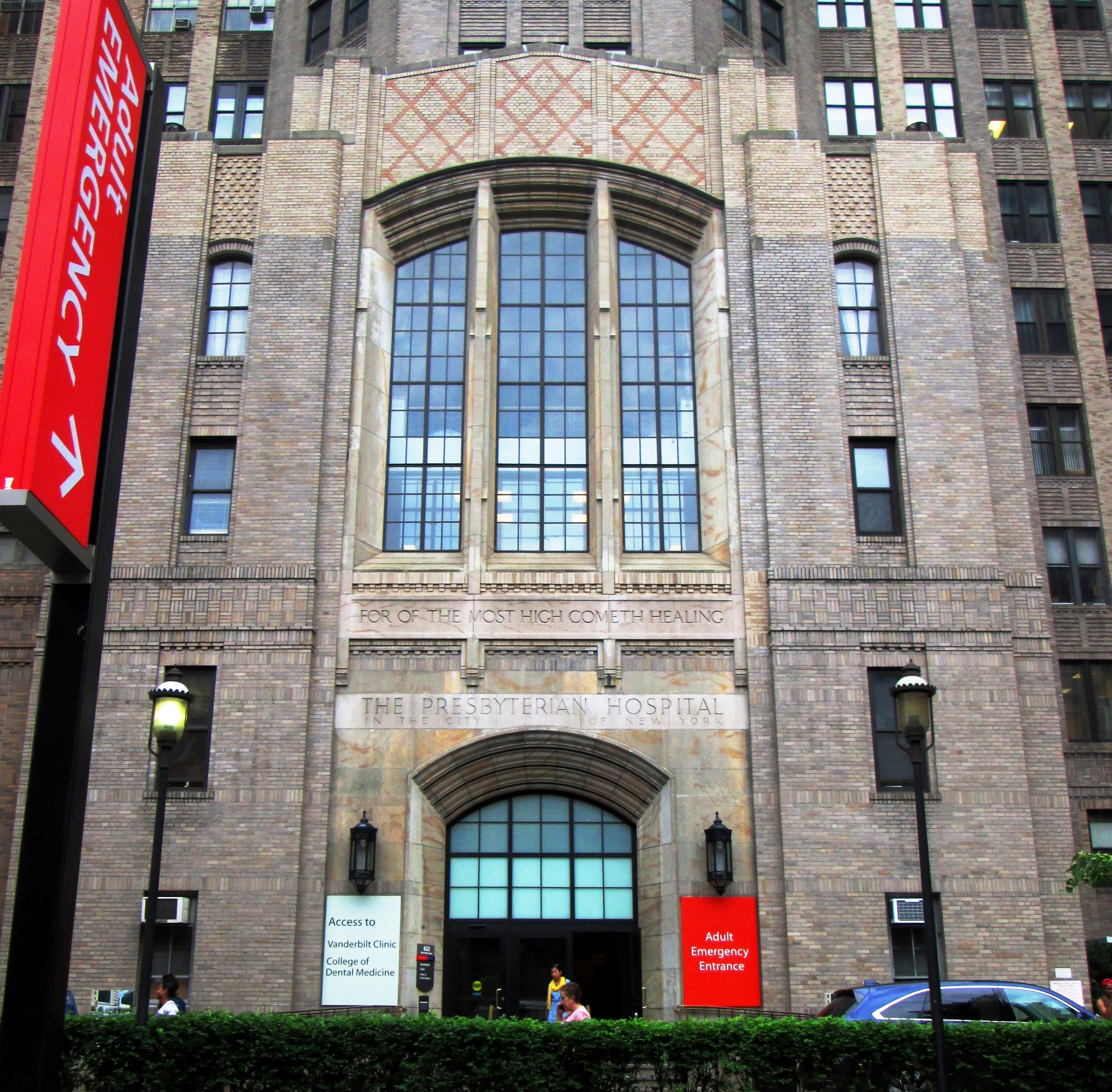
The main entrance of NewYork-Presbyterian Hospital, one of the largest hospitals in the world

Data on health indicators is compiled for each community district in the New York City Department of Health and Mental Hygiene's Community Health Profiles. In Manhattan Community District 12 (Washington Heights and Inwood), as of the data released in 2018, there were 73 preterm births per 1,000 live births (compared to 87 per 1,000 citywide), and 23.3 births to teenage mothers per 1,000 live births (19.3 per 1,000 citywide). The population of uninsured residents was estimated to be 14% (12% citywide).

The concentration of fine particulate matter, the deadliest type of air pollutant, in Community District 12 is 0.0078 milligrams per cubic metre (7.8×10^{−9} oz/ft^{3}) (0.0075 milligrams per cubic metre (7.5×10^{−9} oz/ft^{3}) citywide). 13% of residents are smokers (14% citywide), 26% are obese (24% citywide), 13% are diabetic (11% citywide), and 28% have high blood pressure (28% citywide). Additionally, 24% of children are obese (20% citywide). 81% of residents eat some fruits and vegetables every day (87% citywide). In 2018, 68% of residents described their health as "good", "very good", or "excellent" (78% citywide). For every supermarket, there are an estimated 13 bodegas.

As of 2018, the overall life expectancy of Community District 12 is 84, 2.8 years greater than the citywide average and 5.3 years greater than the nationwide average. Its rates of premature death from cancer (39.1 per 100,000) and heart disease (26.1 per 100,000) are significantly lower than the citywide rates, although its drug-related death rate (9.6 per 100,000) is similar and its suicide death rate (7.2 per 100,000) is higher.

NewYork–Presbyterian Hospital/Columbia University Irving Medical Center opened in 1928 as Columbia–Presbyterian, one of the first academic medical centers in the United States. It was known as the Columbia–Presbyterian Medical Center until 1998. The complex, located between 165th and 168th Streets west of Broadway, contains the Columbia University College of Physicians and Surgeons, the medical school of Columbia University. The campus also contains the Mailman School of Public Health, as well as Morgan Stanley Children's Hospital, New York City's only stand-alone children's hospital. In addition, NewYork–Presbyterian's Allen Hospital is located in Inwood.

== Politics ==
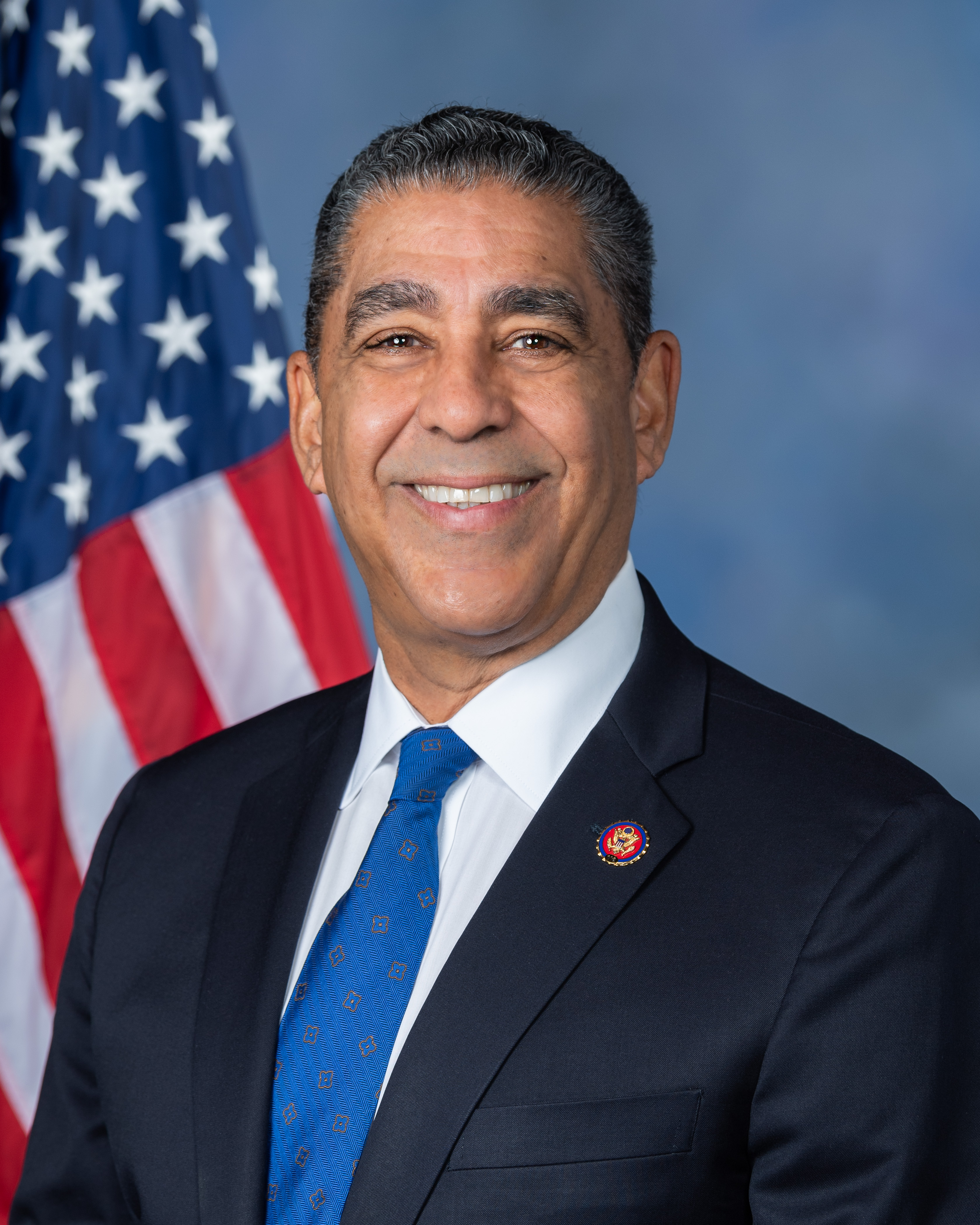
Adriano Espaillat

Politically, Washington Heights is in New York's 13th congressional district for the U.S. House of Representatives represented by Democrat Adriano Espaillat since 2017. On the state level, it is also part of the 31st New York State Senate District, represented by Democrat Robert Jackson since 2019, and the 71st and 72nd New York State Assembly districts, represented by Democrats Al Taylor (since 2017) and Manny De Los Santos (since 2022), respectively. On the city level, the neighborhood is part of the New York City Council 7th and 10th districts, represented by Democrats Shaun Abreu (since 2022) and Carmen De La Rosa (since 2022), respectively.

== Post offices and ZIP Codes ==
Washington Heights is located in three ZIP Codes. From south to north, they are 10032 (between 155th and 173rd Streets), 10033 (between 173rd and 187th Streets), and 10040 (between 187th and Dyckman Streets).

The United States Postal Service operates four post offices in Washington Heights:

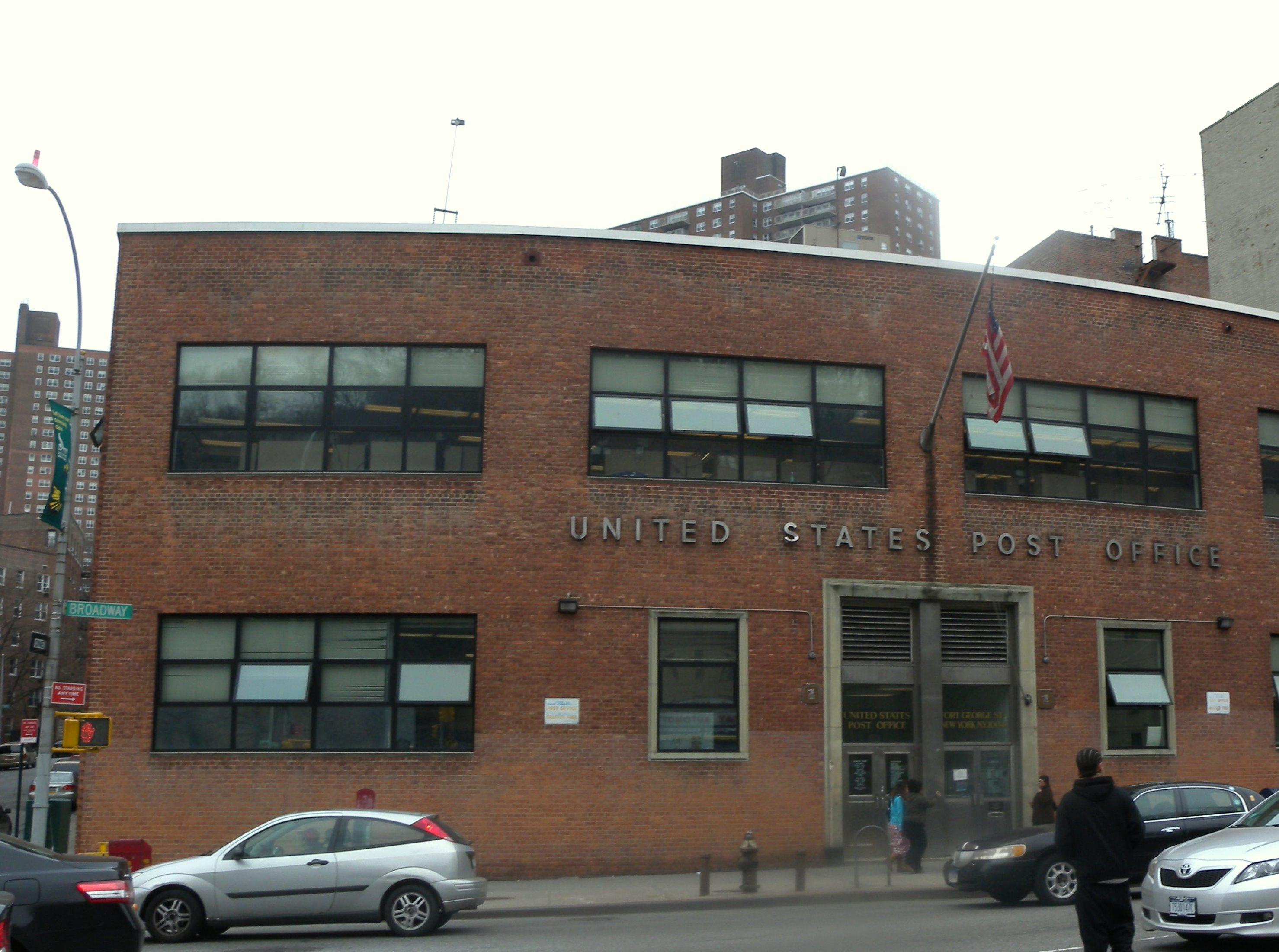
USPS Fort George Station

- Audubon Station – 511 West 165th Street
- Fort George Station – 4558 Broadway
- Fort Washington Station – 556 West 158th Street
- Washington Bridge Station – 518 West 181st Street

== Education ==
Community District 12 has fewer college graduates and more high-school dropouts compared to the borough and city as a whole. 38% of residents age 25 and older have a college education or higher (compared to 43% citywide), and 29% did not finish high school (19% citywide). As of 2018, 19% of elementary-school students missed 20 or more days per school year (20% citywide).

Washington Heights is part of Community School District 6, along with Inwood and Hamilton Heights. Of the district's 19,939 students as of 2019, 85% were Hispanic/Latino, 7% were black, 5% were white, and 3% were any other race; in addition, 29% were English Language Learners (defined as students who require support to learn English as a second language), and 22% were students with disabilities. Of all students in the cohort set to graduate in 2019, 74% in District 6 did so by August 2019 (77% citywide). The district rate was significantly lower for males (69%), English language learners (52%), and students with disabilities (49%). As of 2019, one-quarter of District 6 students were English Language Learners, of whom 96% are Hispanic or Latino.

=== Schools ===
==== Public schools ====
The New York City Department of Education operates public schools in Washington Heights as part of Community School District 6. As with most other school districts in New York City, District 6 has both zoned schools, which take students mainly from a small area in the neighborhood, and unzoned schools, which admit students from anywhere in the district. Zoned public elementary and elementary/middle schools include:

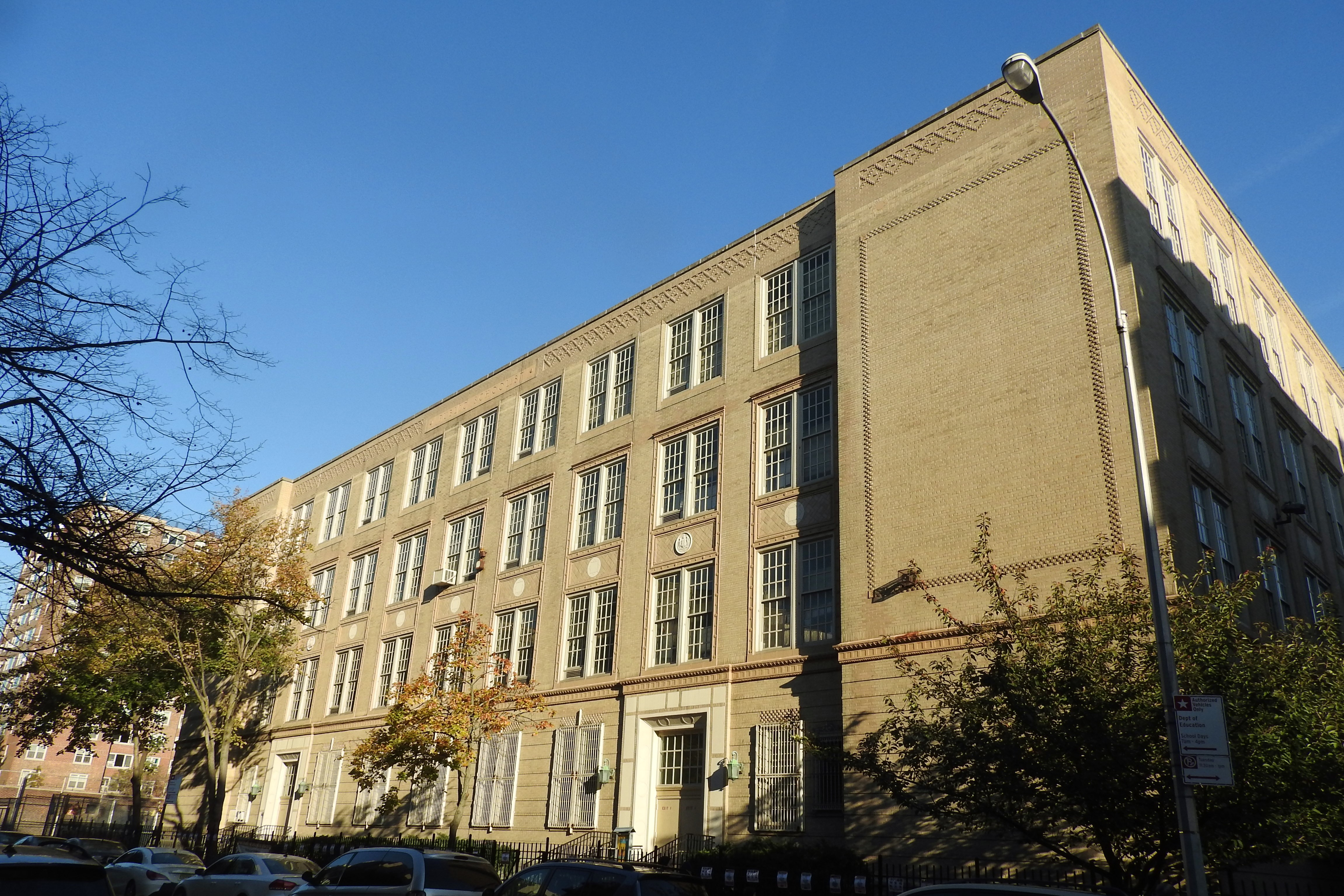
PS/IS 187 Hudson Cliffs

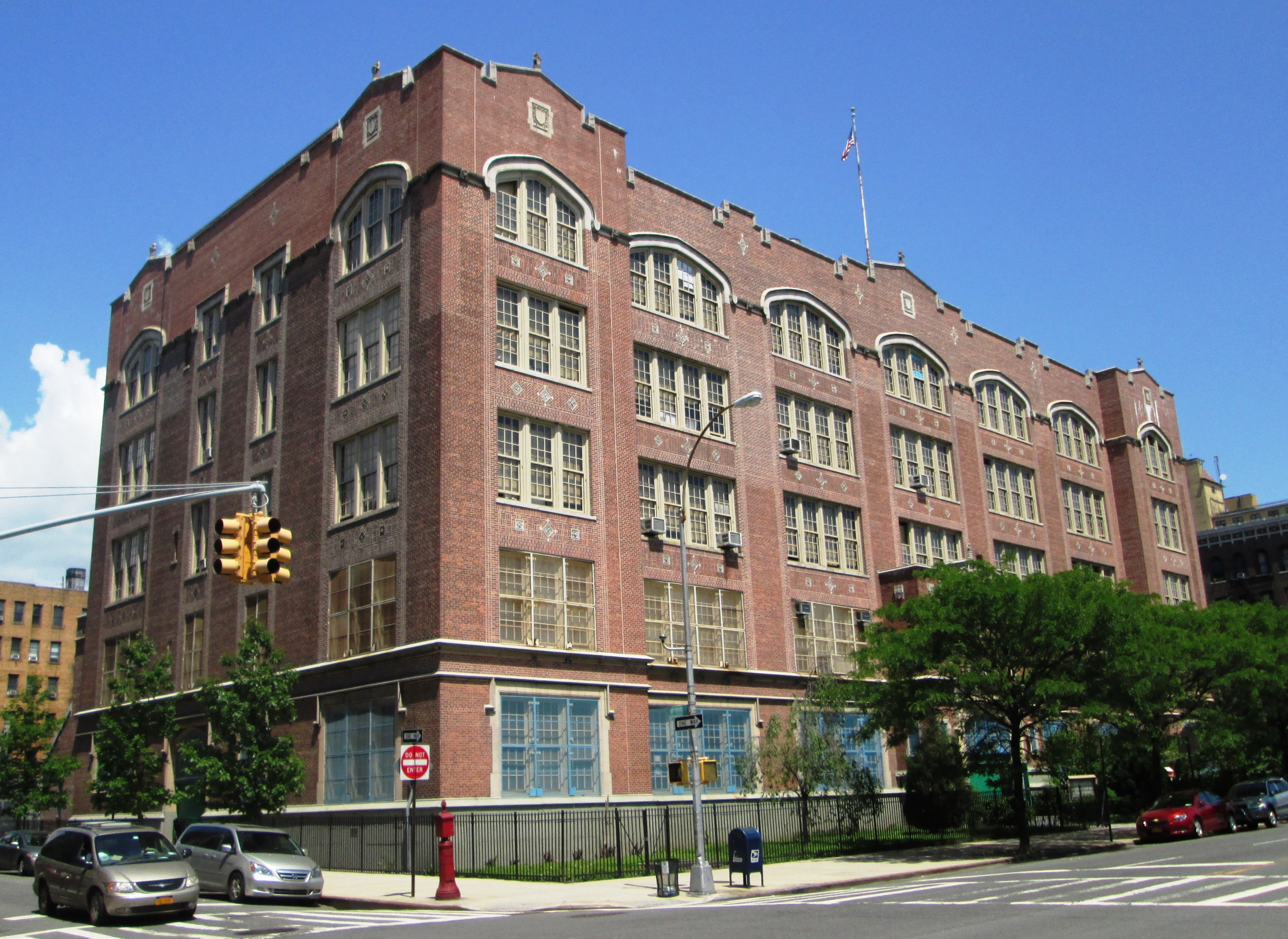
PS 189

- PS 4 Duke Ellington (grades 3K–5)
- PS 8 Luis Belliard (grades 3K–5)
- PS 28 Wright Brothers (grades 3K–5)
- PS 48 PO Michael J Buczek (grades 3K–5)
- PS 115 Alexander Humboldt (grades PK–5)
- PS 128 Audubon (grades 3K–5)
- PS 132 Juan Pablo Duarte (grades K–5)
- PS 152 Dyckman Valley (grades PK–5)
- PS 173 (grades 3K–5)
- PS/IS 187 Hudson Cliffs (grades PK–8)
- PS 189 (grades 3K–5)
- Dos Puentes Elementary School (grades K–5)

Unzoned elementary schools include:

- Castle Bridge School (grades PK–5)
- Professor Juan Bosch Public School (grades K–5)

Zoned middle schools include:

- JHS 143 Eleanor Roosevelt (grades 6–8)
- MS 319 Maria Teresa (grades 6–8)
- MS 322 (grades 6–8)
- MS 324 Patria Mirabal (grades 6–8)

Unzoned middle and middle/high schools include:

- Harbor Heights (grades 6–8)
- Community Math and Science Prep (grades 6–8)
- IS 528 Bea Fuller Rodgers (grades 6–8)
- City College Academy of the Arts (grades 6–12)
- Community Health Academy of the Heights (grades 6–12)

The former George Washington High School, built in 1923, is located between 192nd and 193rd Streets directly west of Highbridge Park. It became the George Washington Educational Campus in 1999 when it was split into four smaller schools:

- The College Academy (grades 9–12)
- High School for Media and Communications (grades 9–12)
- High School for Law and Public Service (grades 9–12)
- High School for Health Careers and Sciences (grades 9–12)

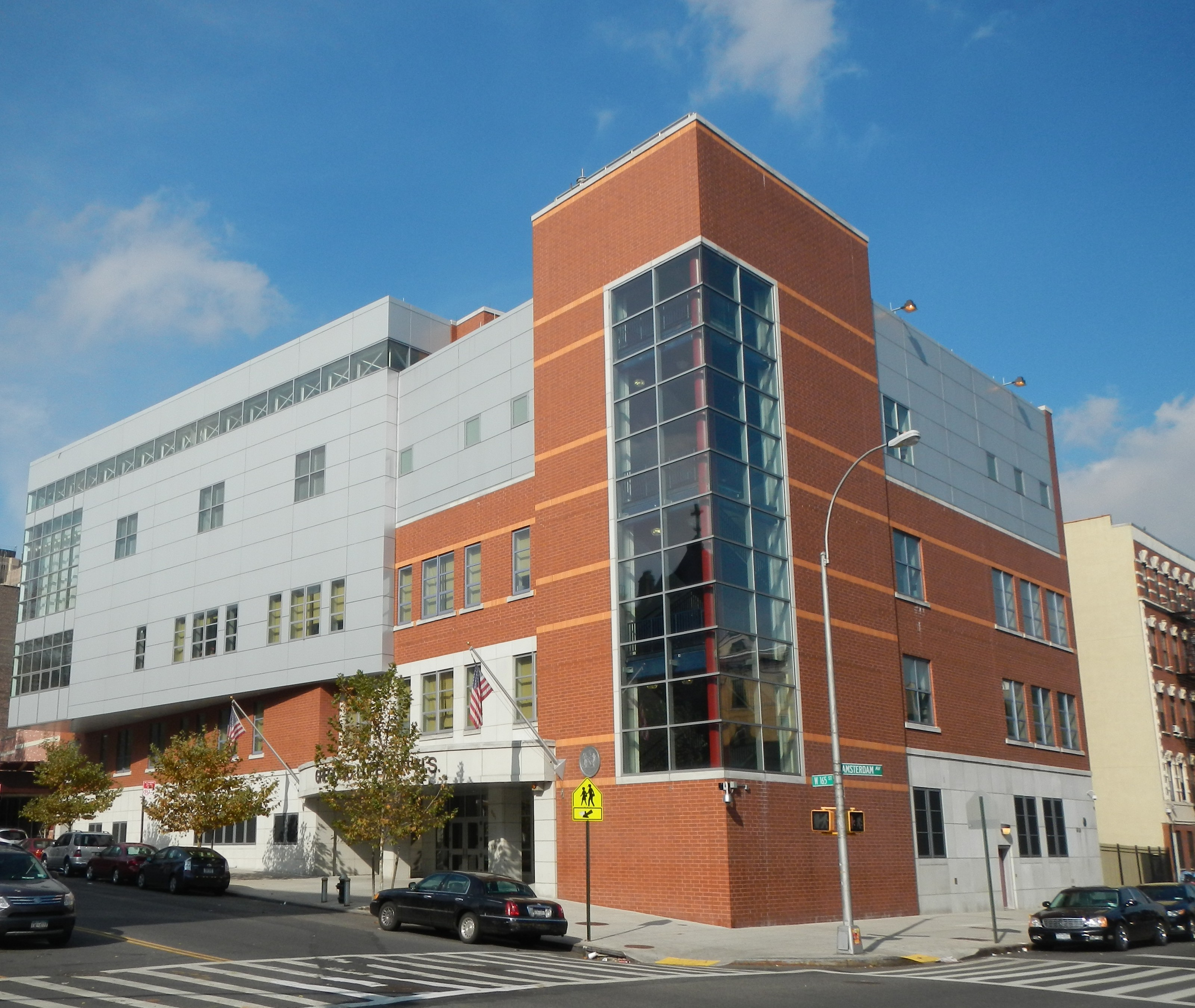
Gregorio Luperón High School for Science and Mathematics

The Gregorio Luperón High School for Science and Mathematics was founded in 1994 and serves a student body of newly arrived Spanish-speakers. Washington Heights also has the unzoned Washington Heights Expeditionary Learning School, serving grades PK to 12.

==== Charter and private schools ====
Charter schools include:

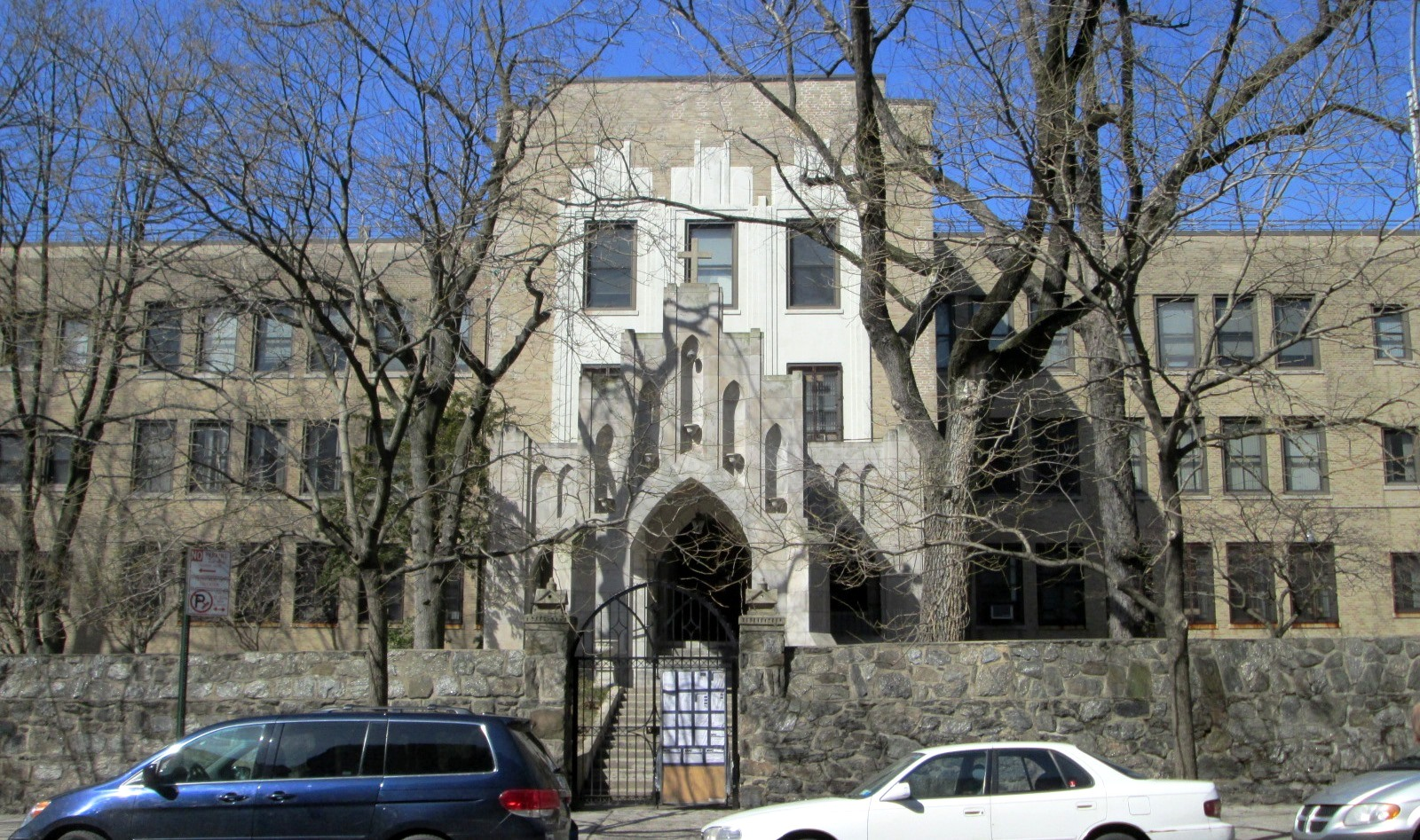
Success Academy Washington Heights, previously the location of Mother Cabrini High School

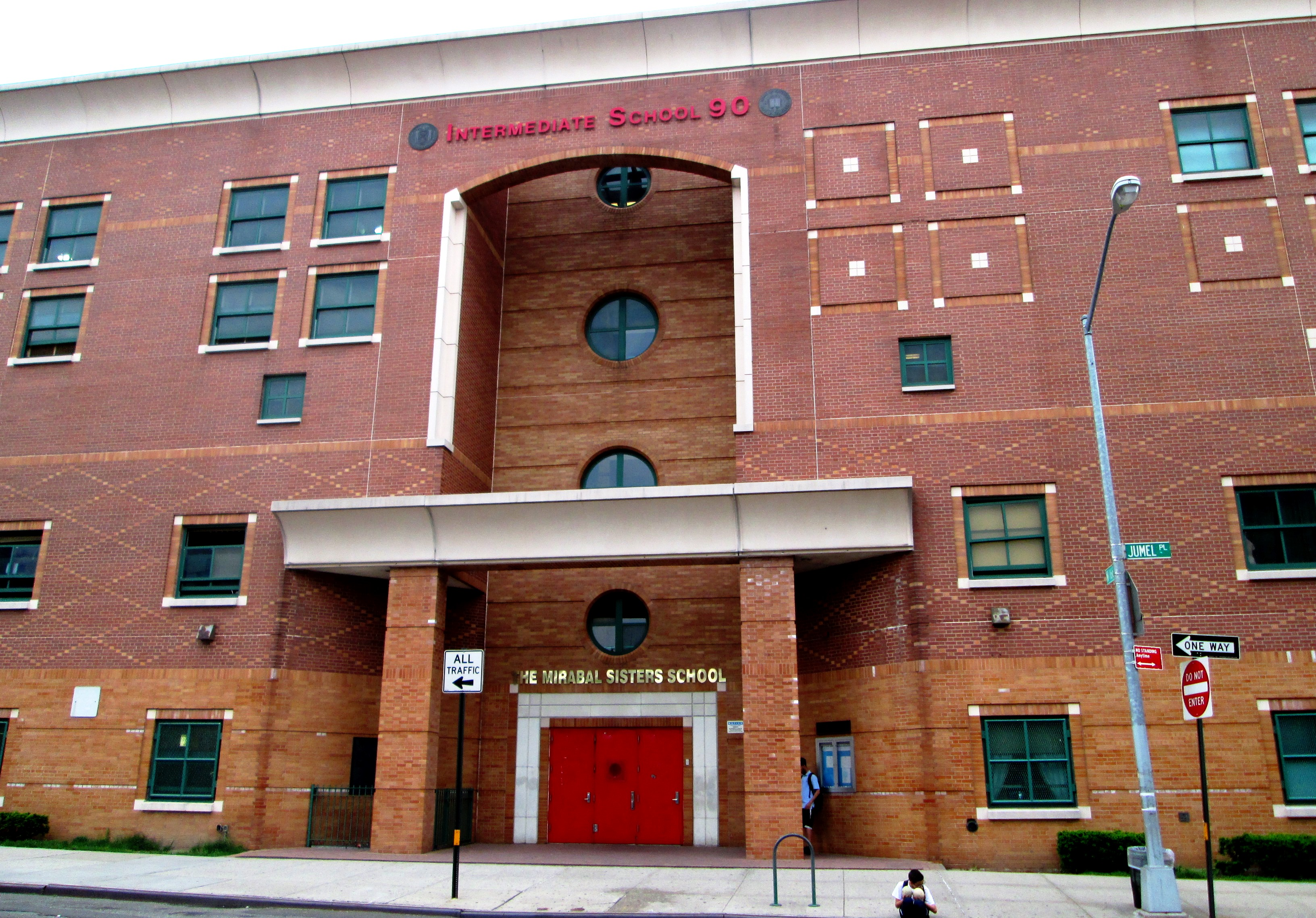
The Mirabal Sisters Campus, housing KIPP Washington Heights, MS 319 Maria Teresa, and MS 324 Patria Mirabal

- WHIN Community Charter School (grades K–3)
- Success Academy Washington Heights (grades K–4)
- KIPP Washington Heights (grades K–8)
- School in the Square (grade 6–8)

Catholic schools under the Roman Catholic Archdiocese of New York include:

- Incarnation School (grades 3K–8)
- St. Elizabeth School (grades 3K–8)

Jewish schools include:

- Yeshiva Rabbi Samson Raphael Hirsch (grades 3K, PK, and 1–12)
- Marsha Stern Talmudical Academy (grades 9–12)

=== Higher education ===
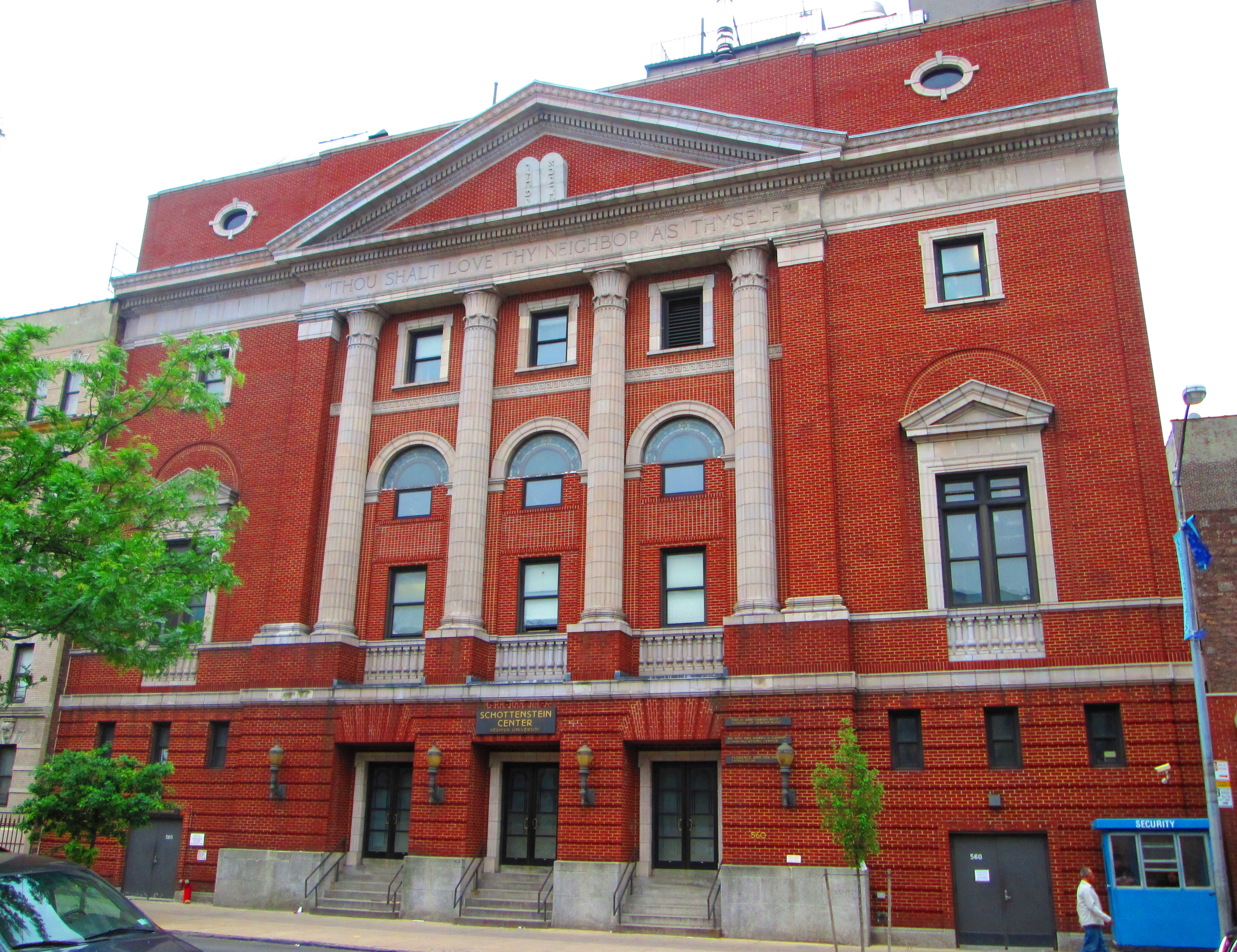
Yeshiva University Schottenstein Center

University education in Washington Heights includes Yeshiva University. Located between 184th and 186th Streets east of Broadway, Yeshiva University's Wilf Campus was founded in 1928 and is the Jewish institution's main campus; it was originally envisioned with Moorish Revival aesthetic, although most of its buildings ended up with a modern design. Schools within the campus include Yeshiva College, the Syms School of Business, and the Marsha Stern Talmudical Academy high school.

Boricua College is another school of higher education in Washington Heights. Boricua College's Manhattan campus is located on 156th and Broadway in the Audubon Terrace complex. It is a small private college founded in 1975 to serve the city's Puerto Rican population.

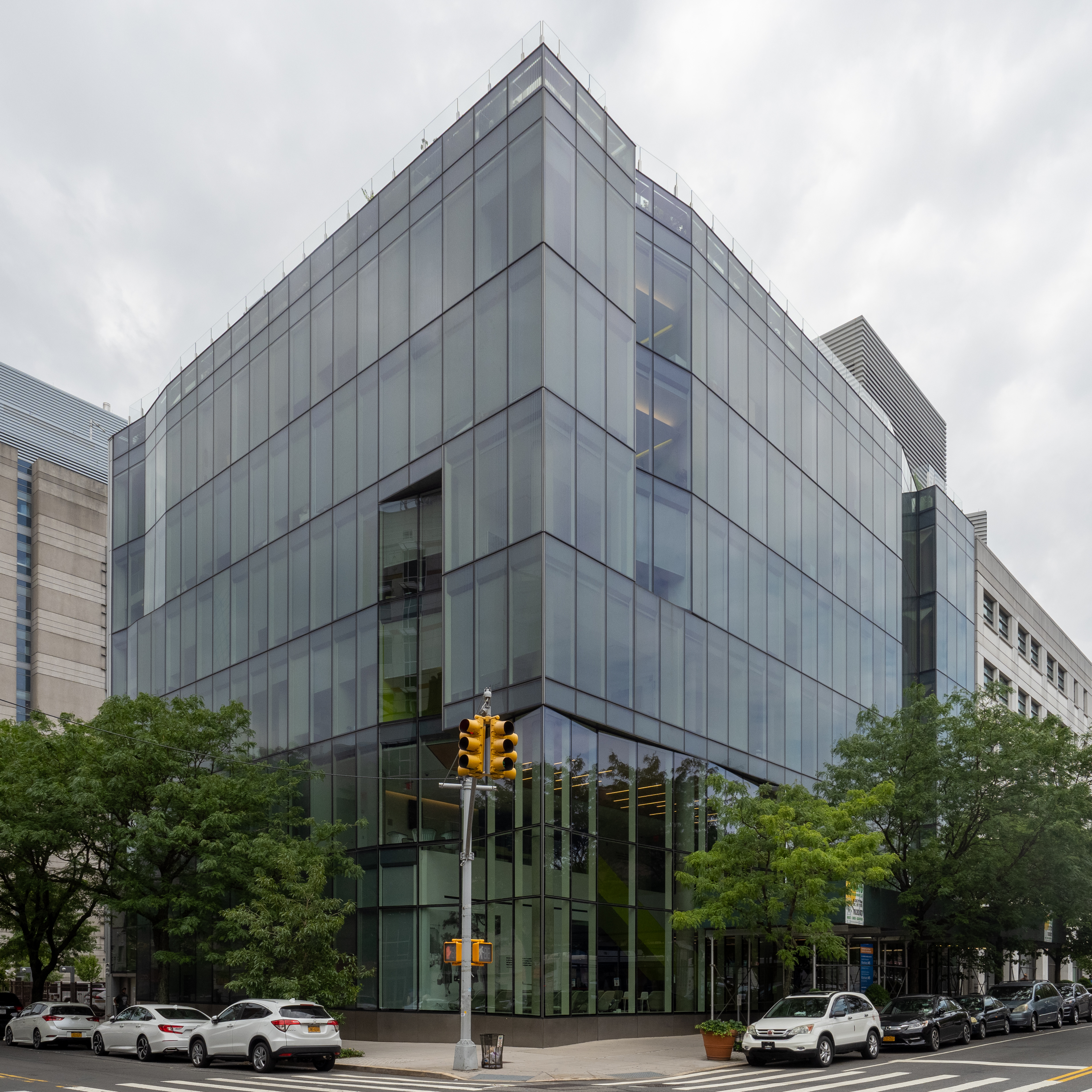
Columbia University School of Nursing

The medical campus of Columbia University hosts the College of Physicians and Surgeons, the College of Dental Medicine, the Mailman School of Public Health, the School of Nursing, and the biomedical programs of the Graduate School of Arts and Sciences, which offer Masters and Doctorate degrees in several fields. These schools are among the departments that compose the Columbia University Irving Medical Center.

CUNY in the Heights, a higher education program of the Borough of Manhattan Community College of the City University of New York, is actually located in Inwood on the corner of 213th Street and Broadway, despite its name. In the same building, the CUNY XPress Immigration Center is a branch of their Citizenship Now! program, which offers immigrants free legal services to help them attain citizenship.

=== Libraries ===
The New York Public Library (NYPL) operates two branches in Washington Heights:

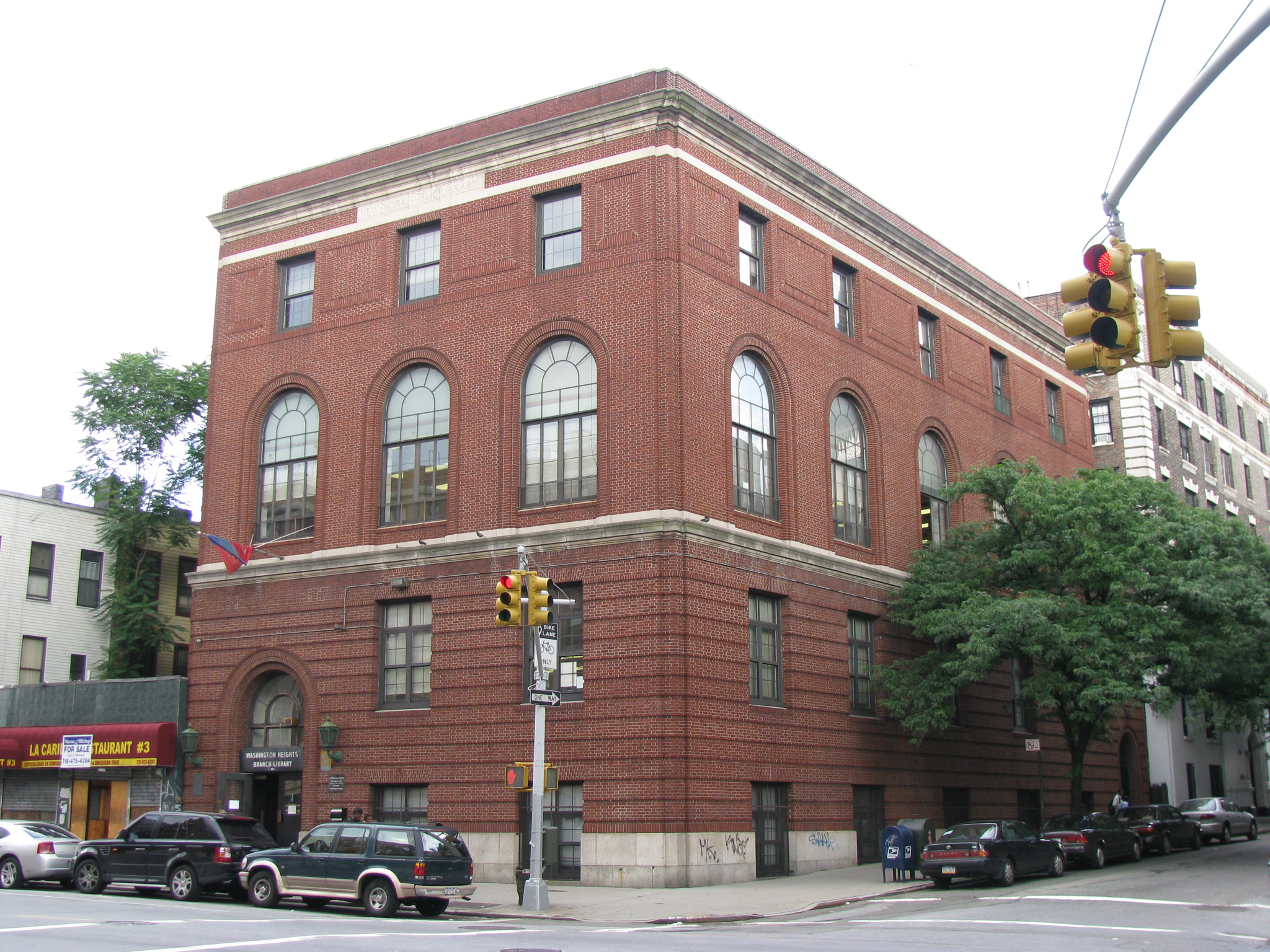
New York Public Library Washington Heights branch

- The Fort Washington branch is located at 535 West 179th Street. The three-story Carnegie library opened in 1979.
- The Washington Heights branch is located at 1000 St. Nicholas Avenue. It was founded in 1868 as a subscription-based library and moved twice before it relocated to its current four-story structure in 1914, owing to generous donations from James Hood Wright.

== Transportation ==
=== Bridges and highways ===
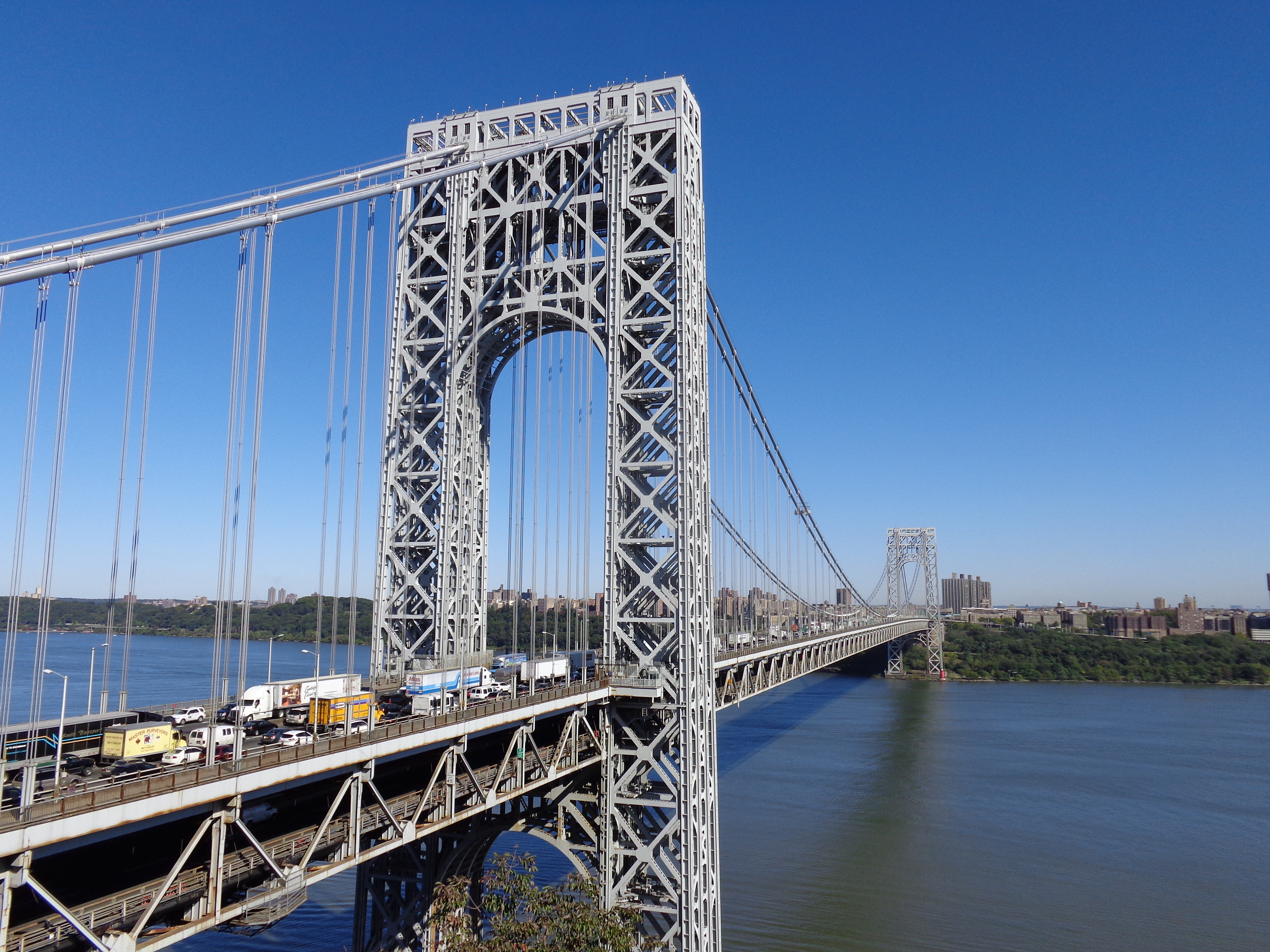
George Washington Bridge

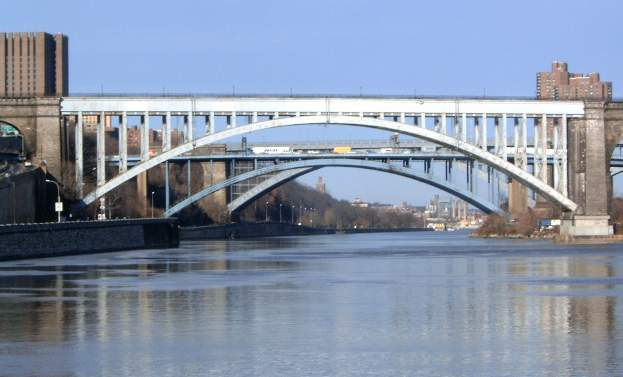
Three of the bridges that cross the Harlem River: High Bridge (in the foreground), the Alexander Hamilton Bridge (in the middle, behind High Bridge), and Washington Bridge (in the background) with Manhattan (on the left) and the Bronx (on the right)

Washington Heights is connected to Fort Lee, New Jersey across the Hudson River via the Othmar Ammann-designed George Washington Bridge, the world's busiest motor vehicle bridge. Upon completion in 1931, it was also the world's longest suspension bridge. The Pier Luigi Nervi-designed George Washington Bridge Bus Terminal is located at the Manhattan end between 178th and 179th Streets, extending between Fort Washington and Wadsworth avenues. After its construction in 1963, Nervi won an award for the terminal's unique use of concrete, including its huge butterfly-like ventilation ducts. The station provides service to North Jersey via NJ Transit Bus Operations; Paterson and Jersey City via Spanish Transportation; the Northeastern Corridor via Greyhound; and upstate New York via Rockland Coaches and OurBus. Independent vans also operate to various locations throughout the Northeastern United States.

The Trans-Manhattan Expressway, part of Interstate 95, runs for 0.8 miles (1.3 km) from the George Washington Bridge in a trench between 178th and 179th Streets. The construction of the George Washington Bridge and the Trans-Manhattan Expressway required the demolition of all apartment buildings between 178th and 179th Streets, in addition to many west of Cabrini Boulevard between 177th and 181st Streets, evicting over 1,000 families. To the east, the highway leads to the Alexander Hamilton Bridge, completed in 1963, which crosses the Harlem River and connects to the Bronx via the Cross Bronx Expressway. The Washington Bridge, built in 1888, crosses the river just north of the Alexander Hamilton Bridge and connects to both the Trans-Manhattan and Cross Bronx expressways.

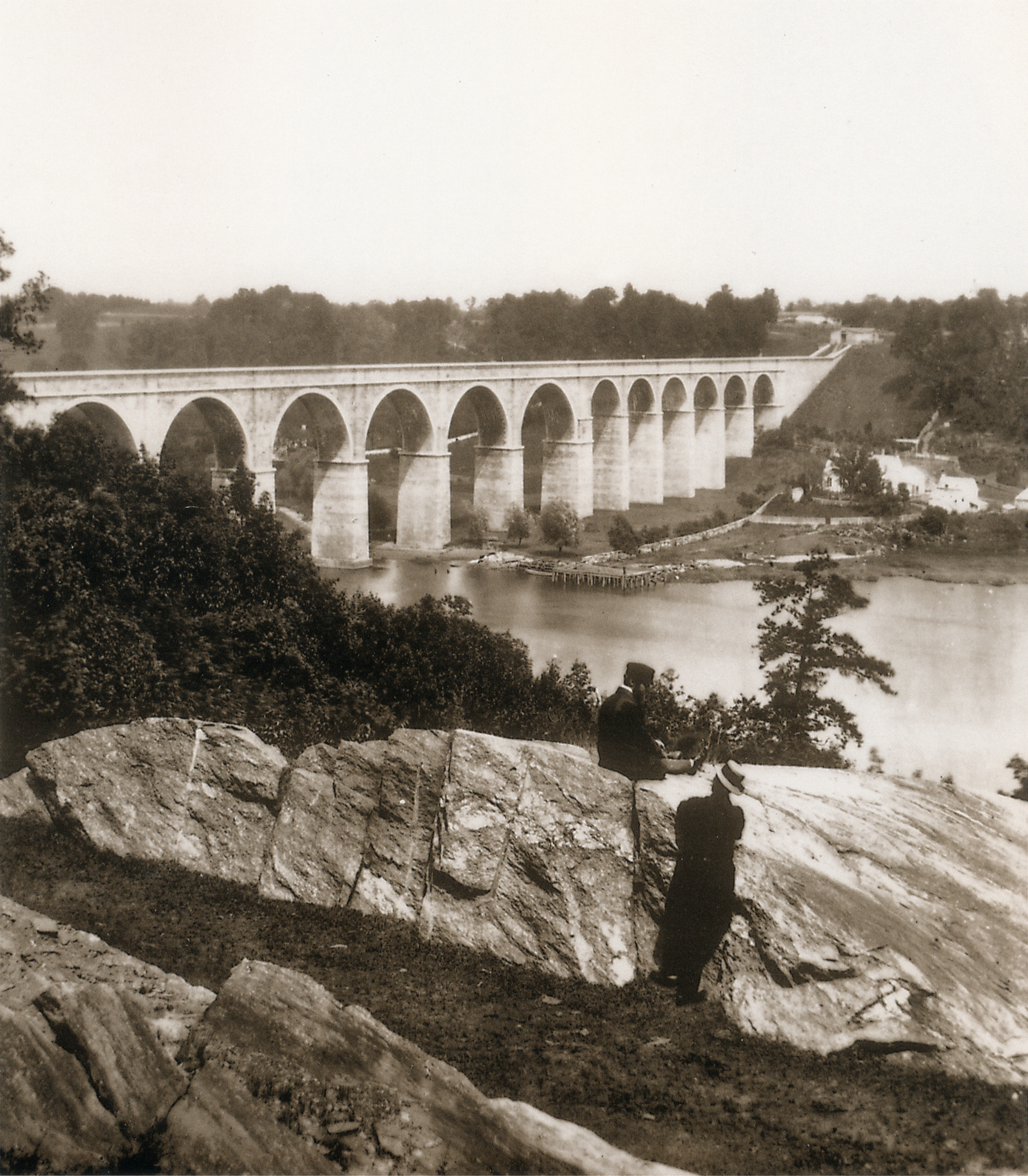
High Bridge crossing the Harlem River

Crossing the river at 175th Street in Manhattan, the High Bridge is the oldest bridge in New York City still in existence. The bridge was completed in 1848 to carry the Croton Aqueduct as part of the city's water system; a promenade was added in 1864 that stayed in use up until the 1970s, although the aqueduct function was discontinued in 1949. In the late 1920s, several of its stone piers were replaced with a steel arch that spanned the river to allow ships to more easily navigate under the bridge. In June 2015, the High Bridge reopened as a pedestrian and bicycle bridge after a three-year rehabilitation project.

For transport northward and southward across Manhattan, Washington Heights is connected with two other significant highways: the Harlem River Drive by the Harlem River and the Henry Hudson Parkway (part of New York State Route 9A) by the Hudson River. The Harlem River Drive began as a horse carriage roadway in 1898 and was converted into a highway exclusively for cars during the 1950s. The road has since blocked access to the waterfront from Highbridge Park, although the Harlem River Greenway (planned for renovation as of 2019) can still be accessed from 155th Street and Dyckman Street. The Henry Hudson Parkway, built in 1936, is also surrounded by parkland but leaves Fort Washington Park with a large amount of waterfront space on its western side, while the Hudson River Greenway lies on its eastern side. Running above-ground between the highway and the greenway is the Empire Service Amtrak line, whose closest stops are at Yonkers and Penn Station.

=== Subway ===
Washington Heights is well served by the New York City Subway. On the IND Eighth Avenue Line, service is available at the 155th Street and 163rd Street–Amsterdam Avenue stations (C train), the 168th Street station (1, A, and C trains), and the 175th Street, 181st Street, and 190th Street stations (A train). The IRT Broadway–Seventh Avenue Line (1 train) has stops at 157th Street, 168th Street, 181st Street, and 191st Street.

Out of these stations, only 175th Street is fully accessible, although the tunnel to the George Washington Bridge Bus Station at its 177th Street exit is not. The 168th Street station is accessible only for the entrance to the A and C trains. To help residents navigate the steep hills of the neighborhood's northwestern area, the 181st Street and 190th Street IND stations provide free elevator service between Fort Washington Avenue and the Broadway valley below. On the northeastern side, the 191st Street station also has an elevator to St. Nicholas Avenue and a tunnel running to Broadway.

The 181st Street and 190th Street IND stations have several unique entrances and exits, many featuring a stone-brick design inspired by the Overlook Terrace cliffside. The 168th Street, 190th Street, and both 181st Street stations are listed on the National Register of Historic Places. The 191st Street and 190th Street stations have the distinction of being the deepest in the entire subway system by distance to ground level, at 180 and 140 feet, respectively. In 1951, researchers from New York University found that the 190th Street station would provide shelter from nuclear fallout.

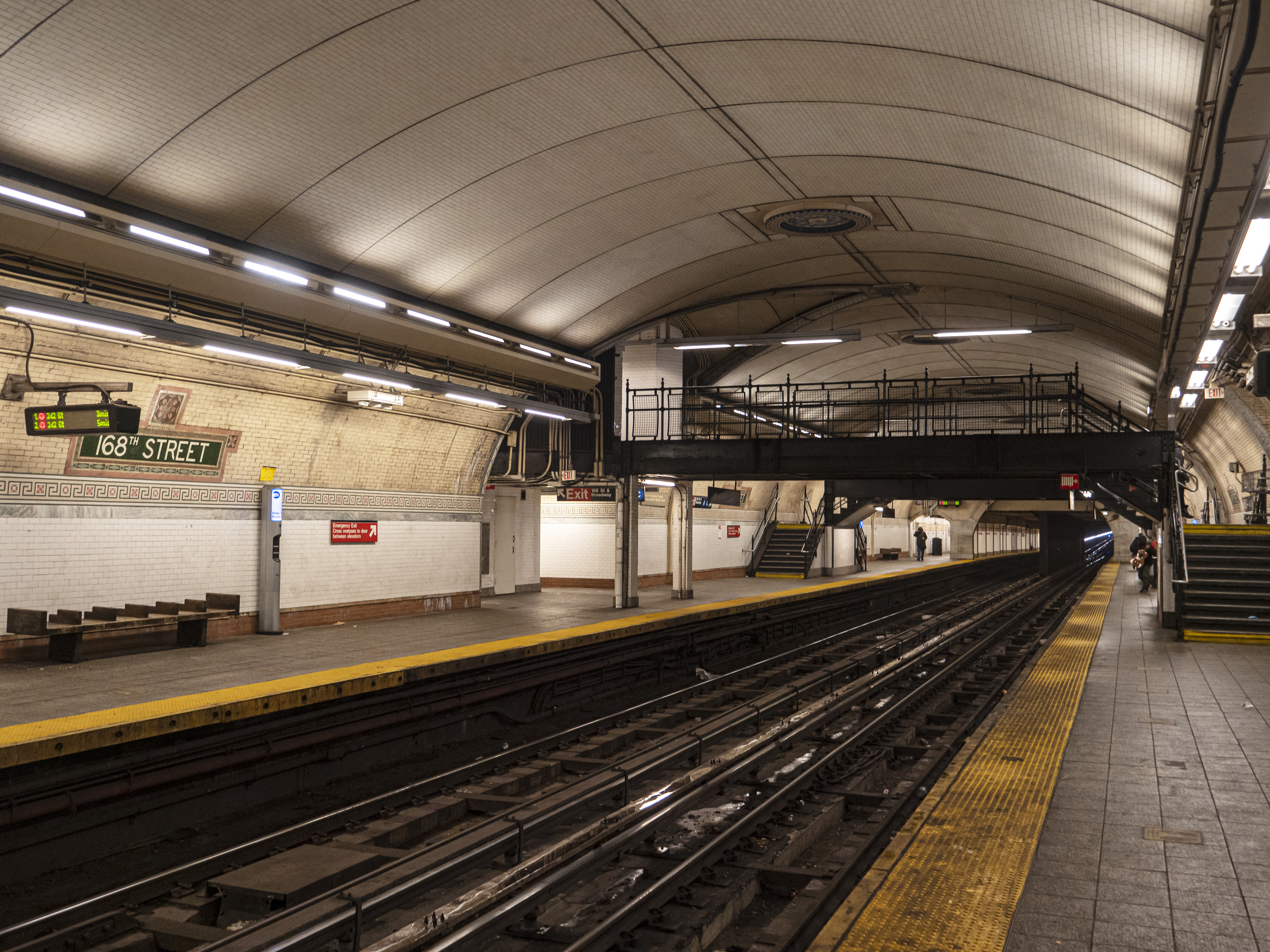
The 168th Street station's IRT platform

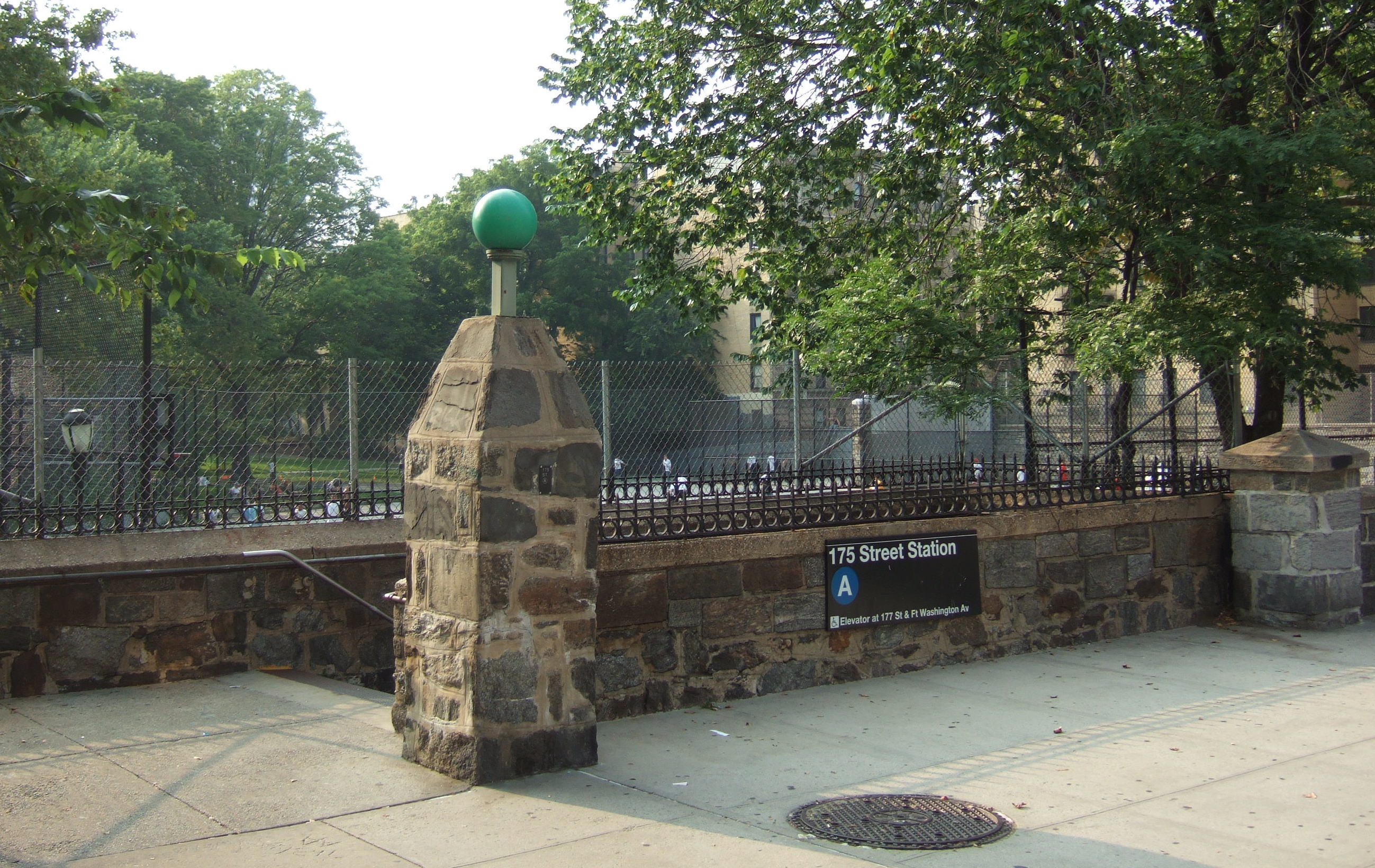
Entrance to the 175th Street station in front of J. Hood Wright Park

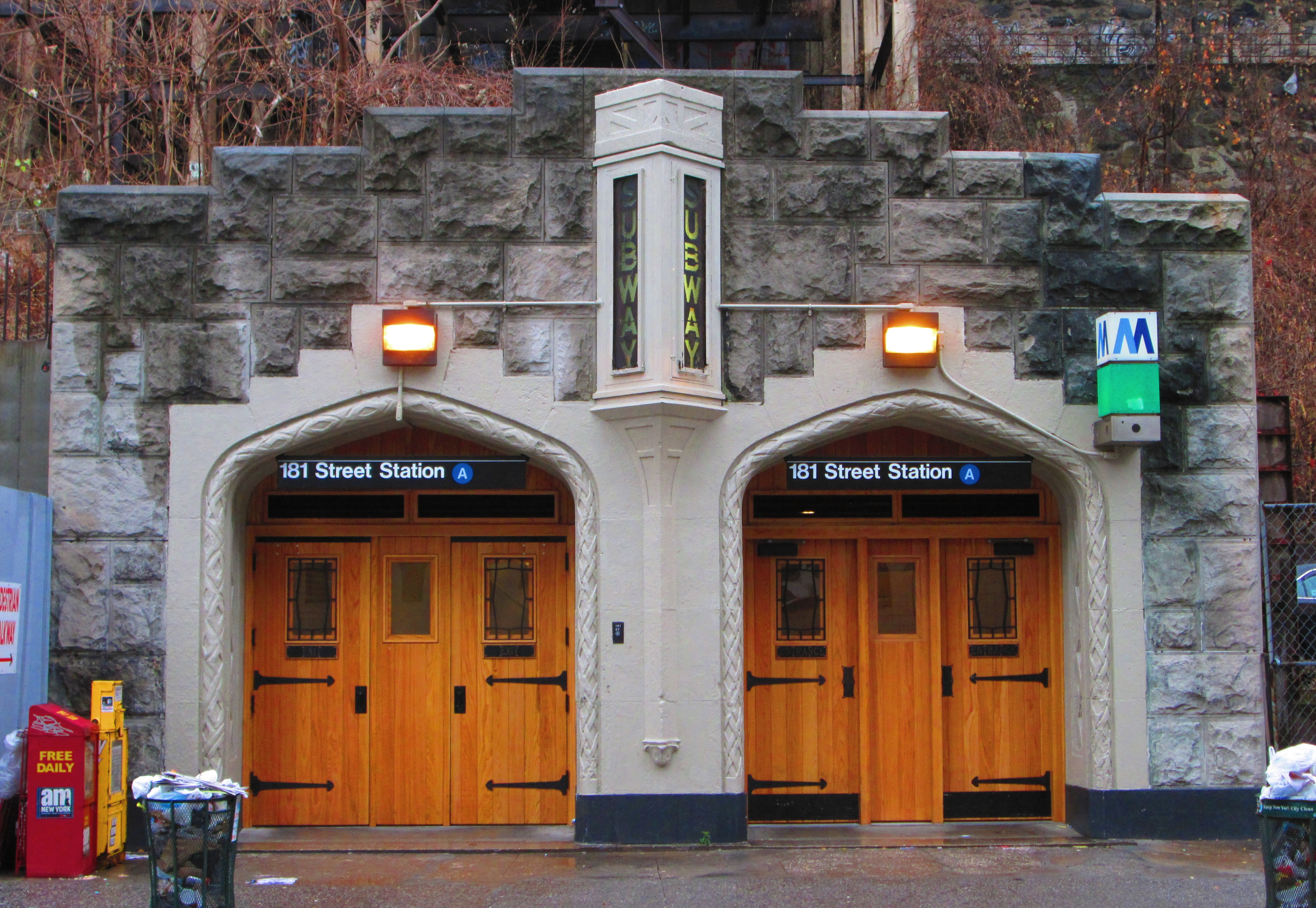
Entrance to the 181st Street IND station on Overlook Terrace at 184th Street

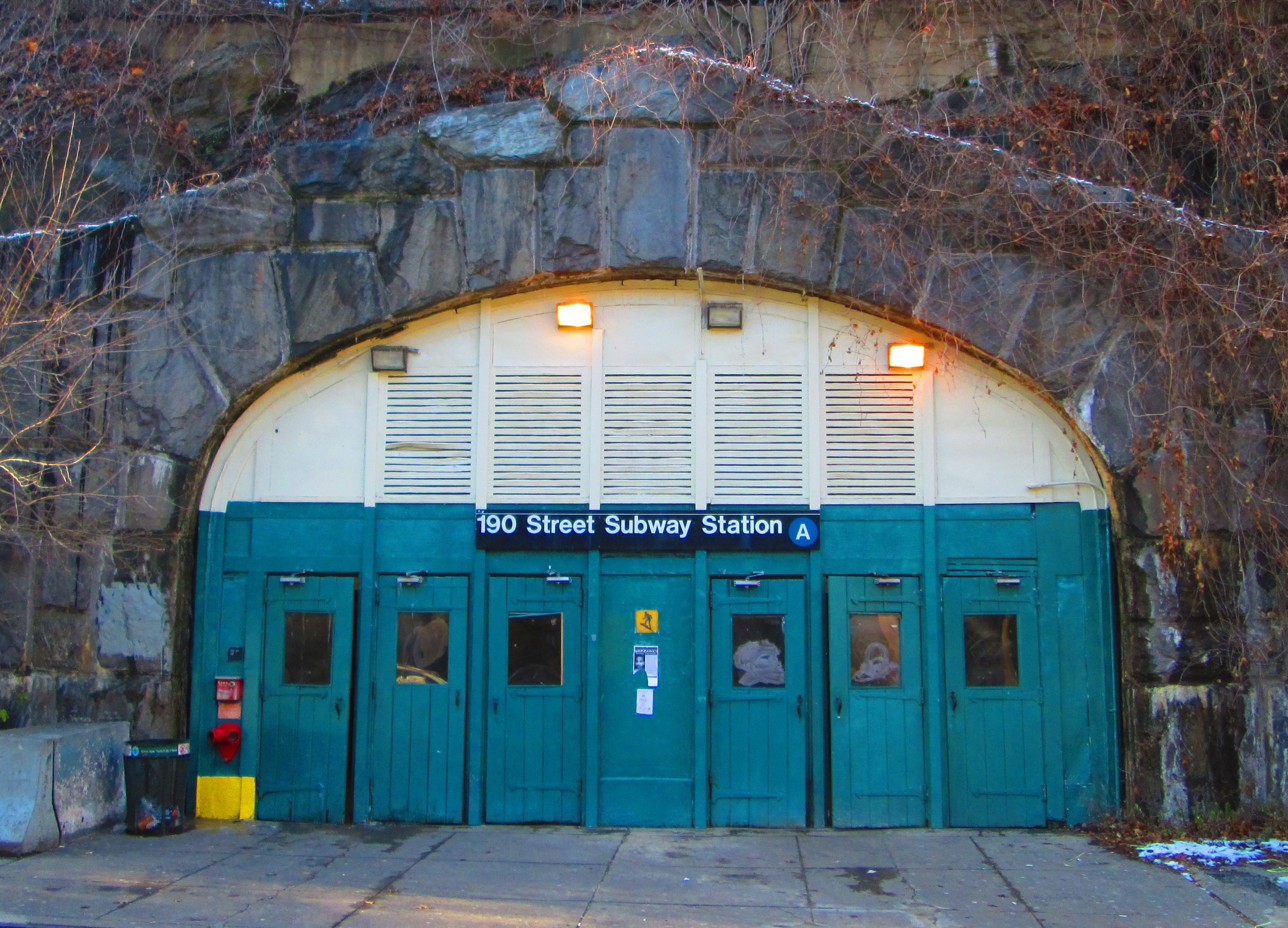
Entrance to the 190th Street station on Bennett Avenue

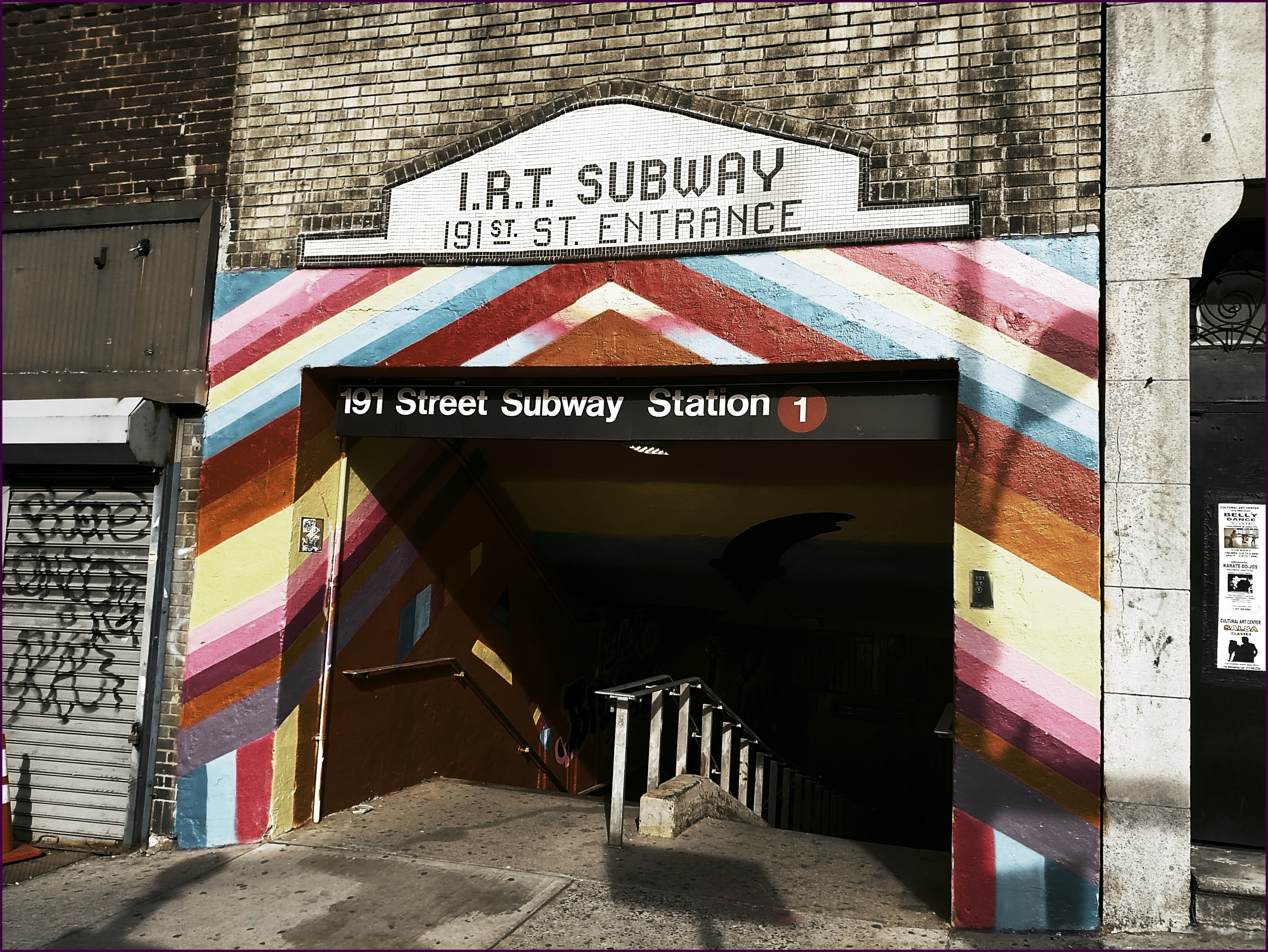
Entrance to the 191st Street station on Broadway

=== Bus ===
Several MTA Regional Bus Operations bus routes serve Washington Heights:

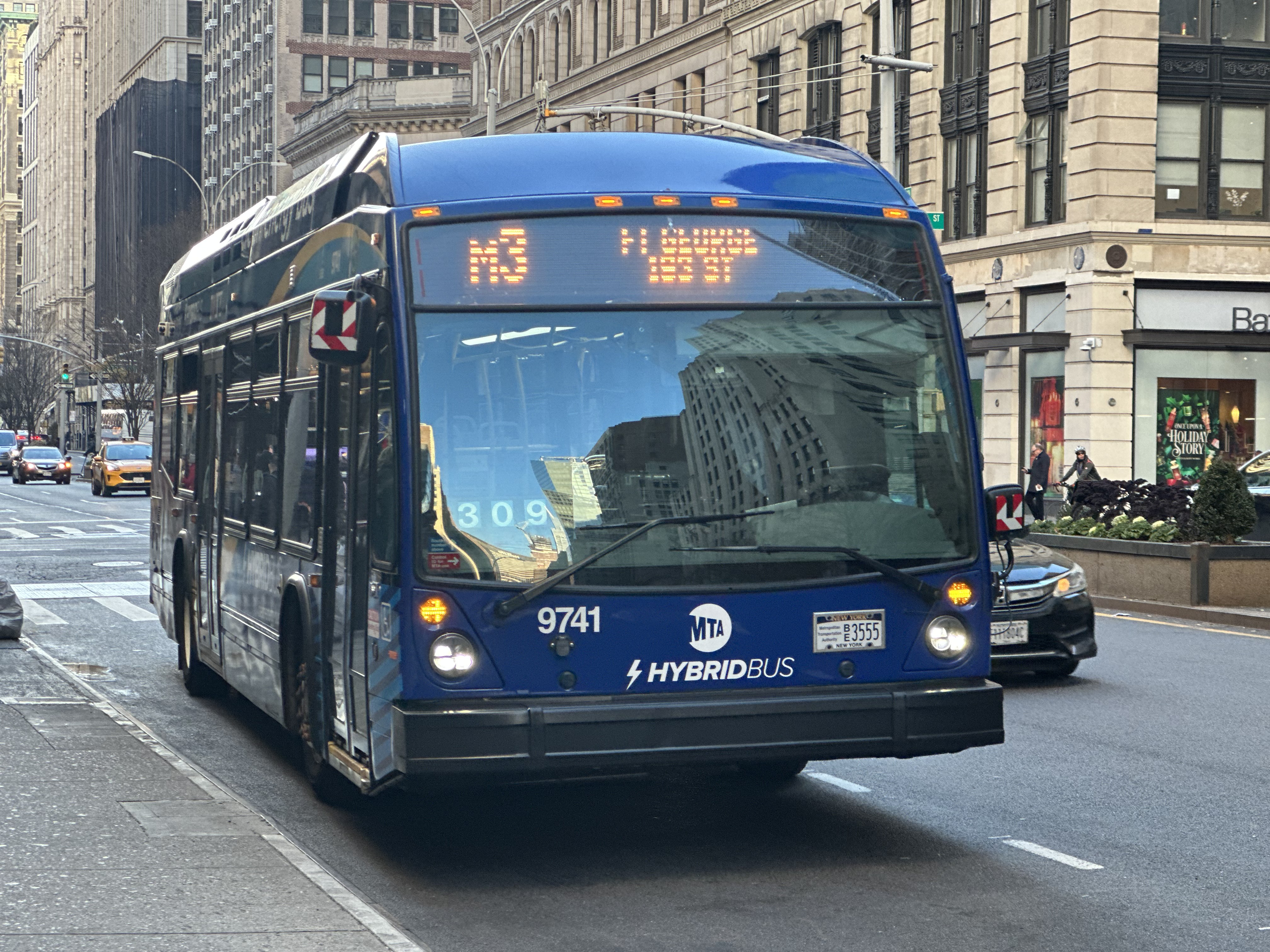
M3 bus

- Bx3: to 238th Street station (1 train) via 181st Street and University Avenue
- Bx6 and Bx6 Select Bus Service: to Hunts Point Cooperative Market via Riverside Drive, 155th, 161st and 163rd Streets and Hunts Point Avenue
- Bx7: to College of Mount Saint Vincent via Broadway and Riverdale Avenue
- Bx11: to Parkchester station via 181st, 170th, and 174th Streets
- Bx13: to Bronx Terminal Market via 181st Street and Ogden Avenue
- Bx35: to Crotona Park East, Bronx via 181st Street, 167th, and 169th Streets
- Bx36: to Castle Hill, Bronx via 181st Street, Tremont Avenue, and White Plains Road
- M2: to Greenwich Village via Fifth/Madison Avenues, Edgecombe Avenue, and Adam Clayton Powell Jr. Boulevard
- M3: to Greenwich Village or Fort George via Fifth/Madison Avenues and St. Nicholas Avenue
- M4: to Midtown South or Fort Tryon Park/The Cloisters via Fifth/Madison Avenues, Fort Washington Avenue, and Broadway
- M5: to Midtown South via Broadway and Riverside Drive
- M10: to Columbus Circle via Frederick Douglass Boulevard
- M98: to Lenox Hill or Fort Tryon Park via Third/Lexington Avenues, Harlem River Drive, 178th/179th Streets, and Fort Washington Avenue
- M100: to Manhattanville or Inwood via Broadway, St. Nicholas Avenue, and Amsterdam Avenue
- M101: to East Village or Fort George via Third/Lexington Avenues and Amsterdam Avenue

== Notable people ==
Notable residents of Washington Heights include:

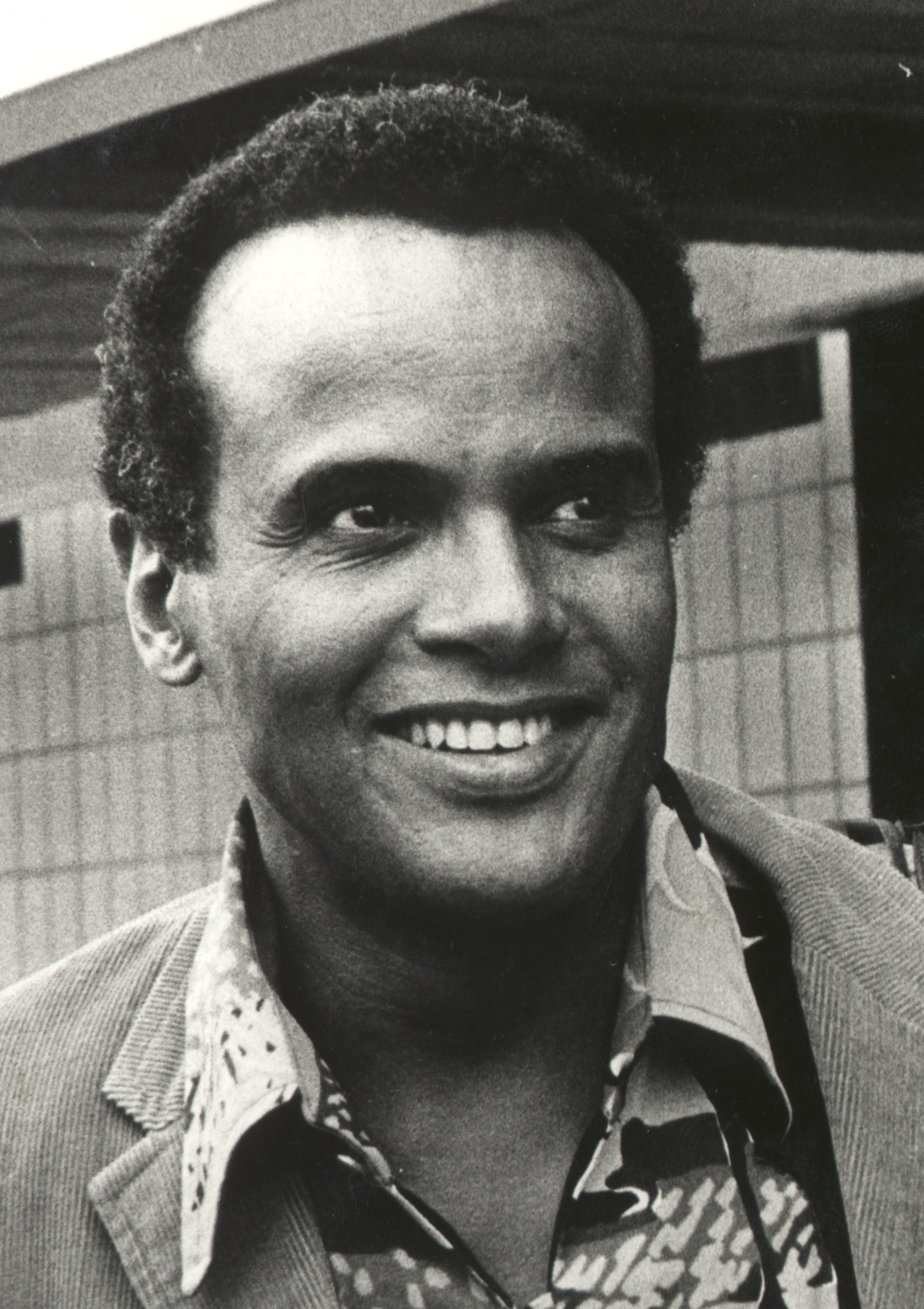
Harry Belafonte

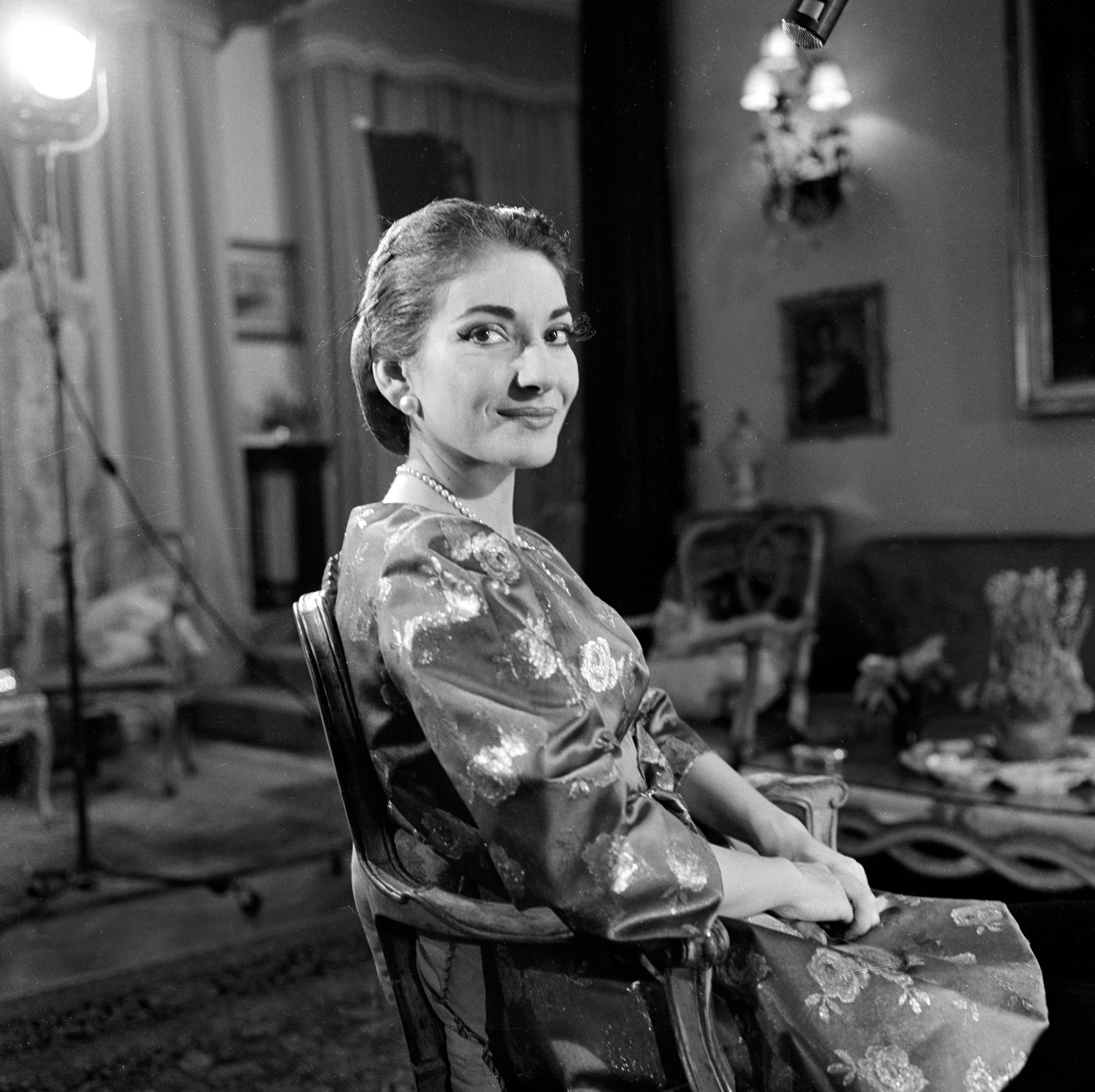
Maria Callas

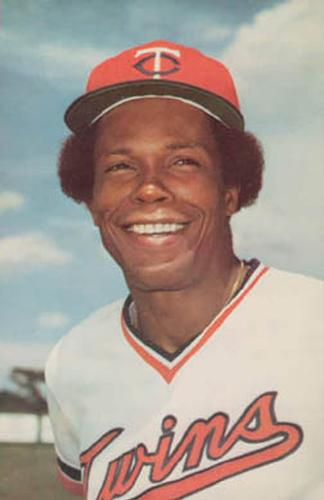
Rod Carew

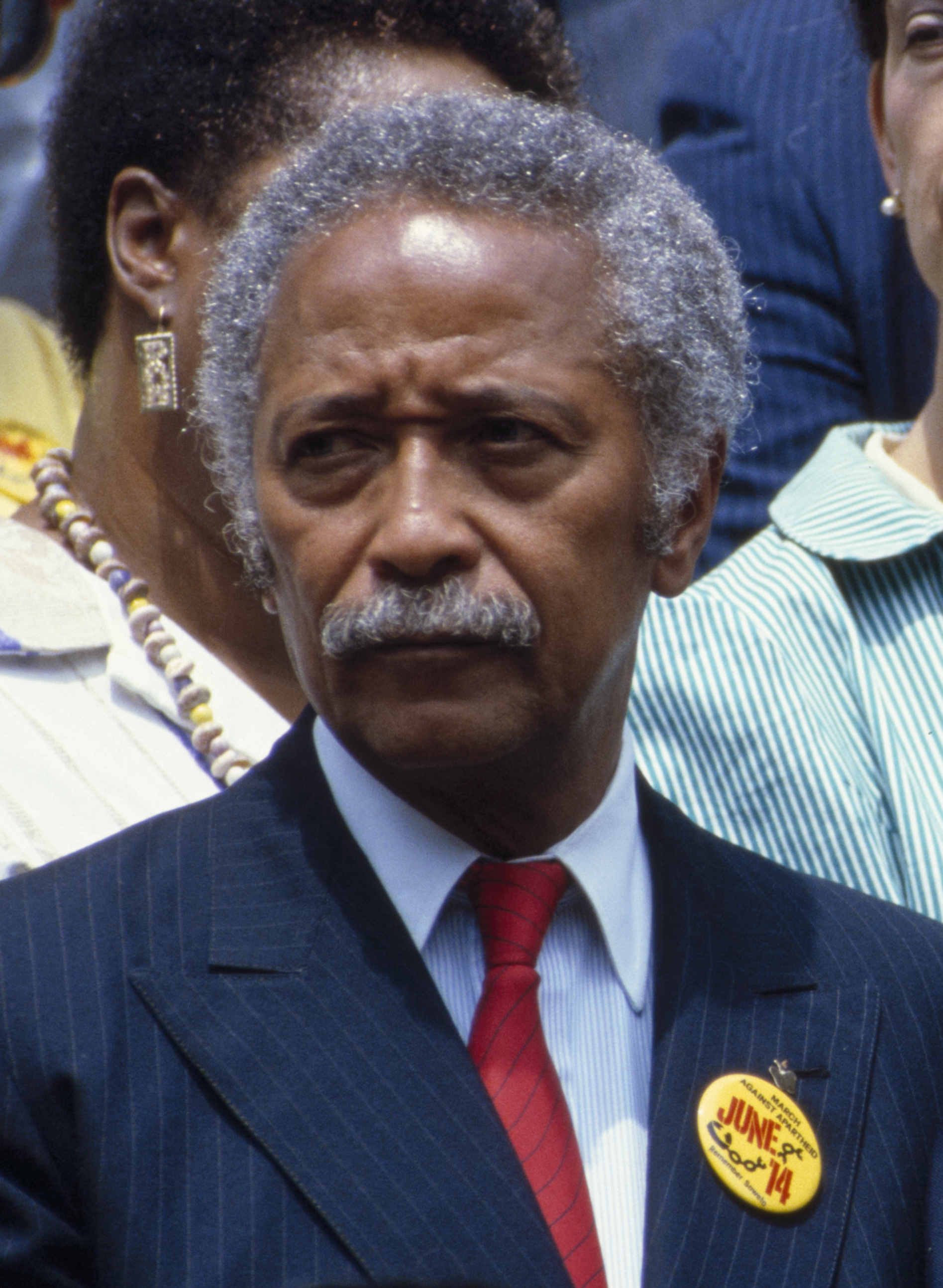
David Dinkins

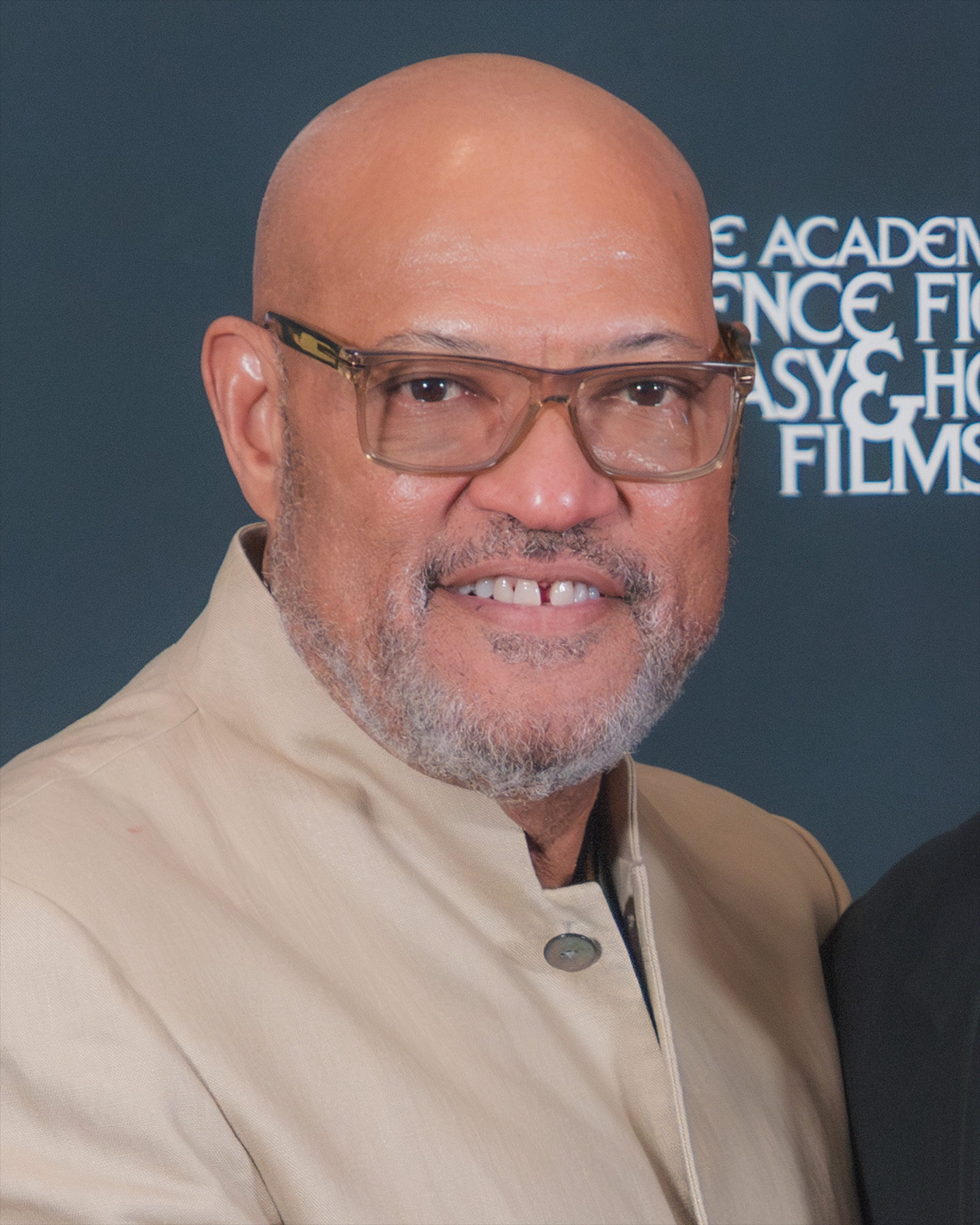
Laurence Fishburne

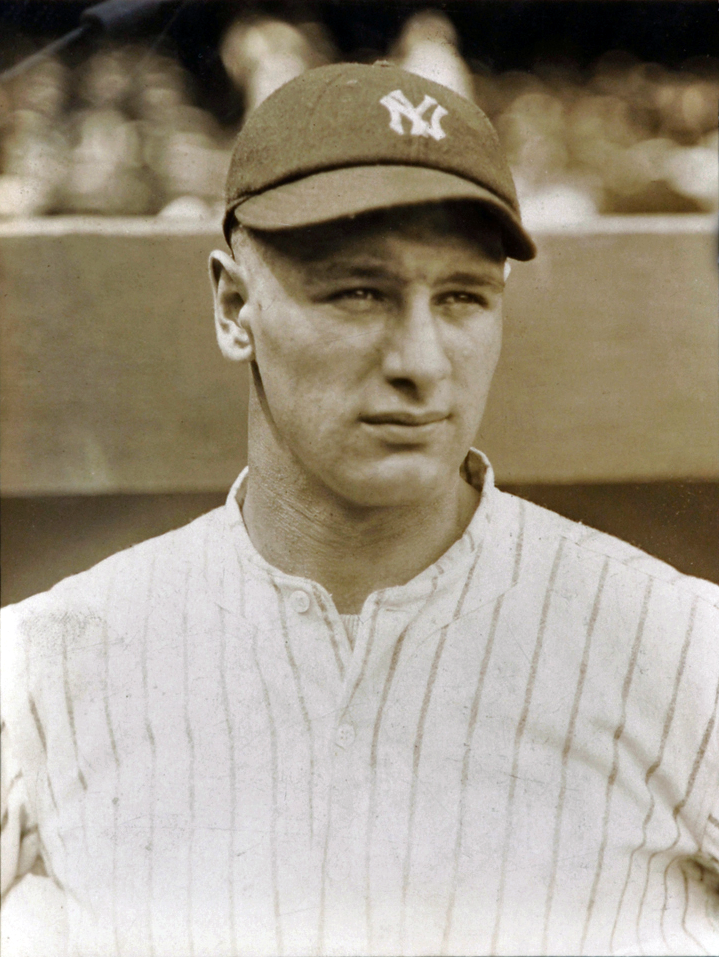
Lou Gehrig

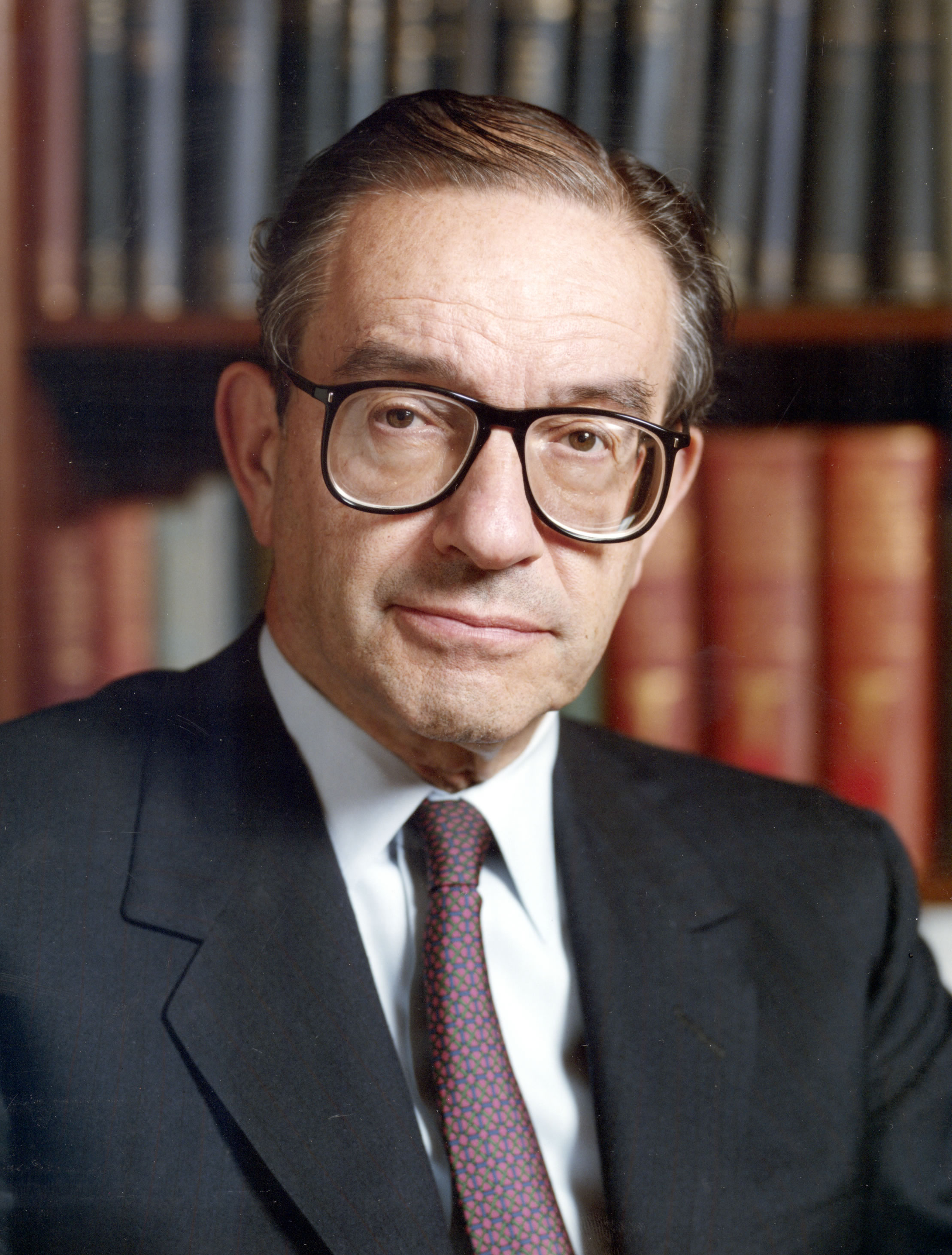
Alan Greenspan

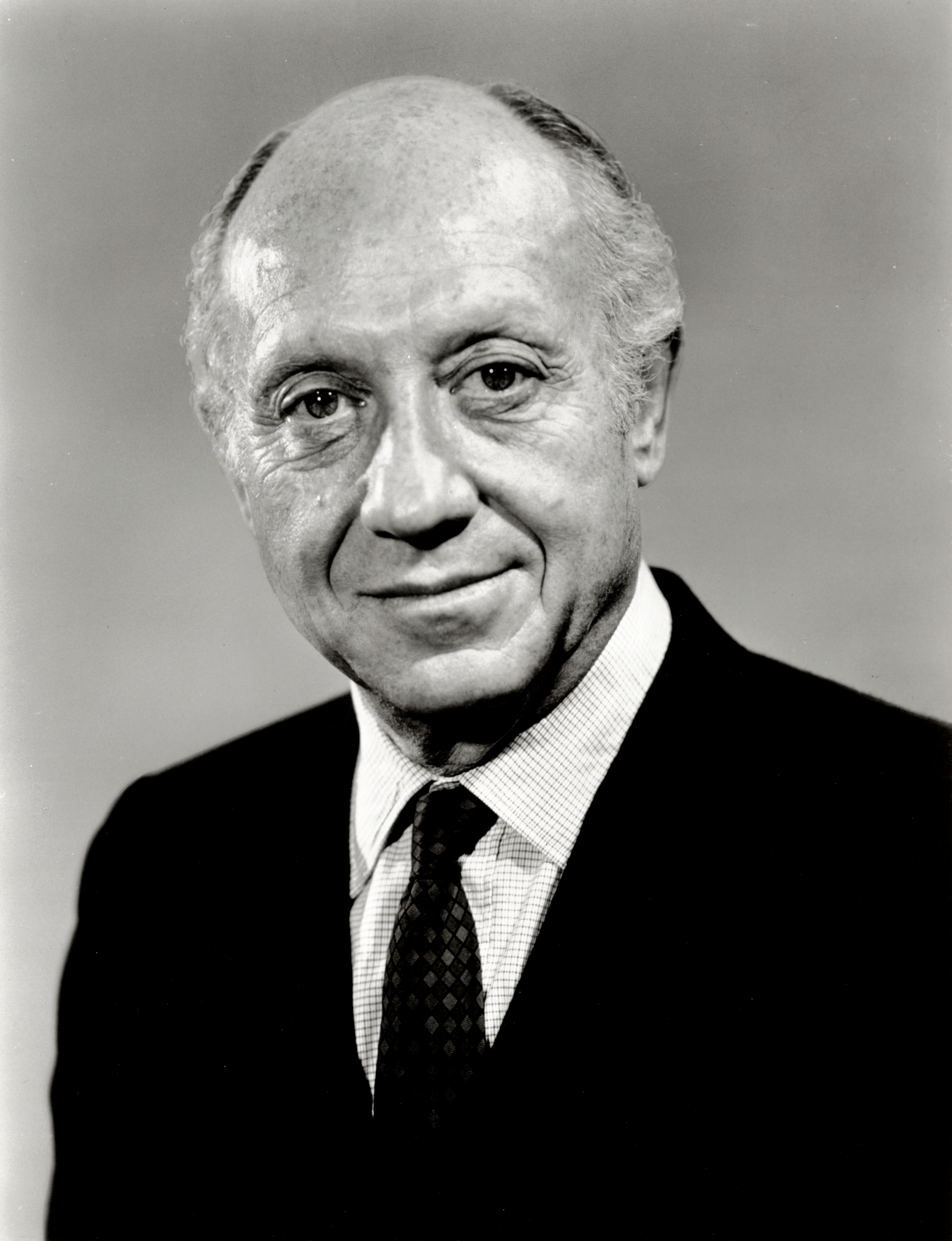
Jacob Javits

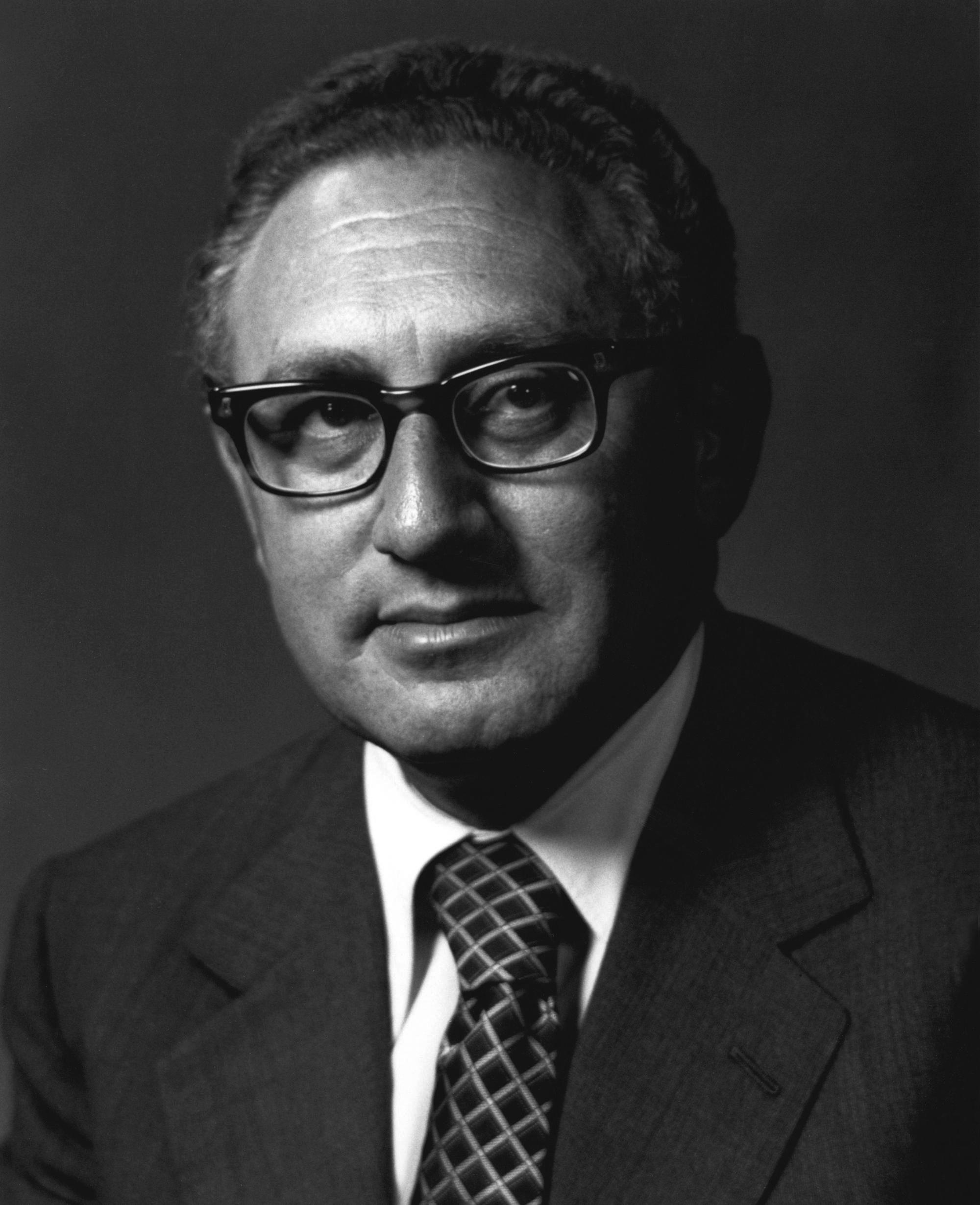
Henry Kissinger

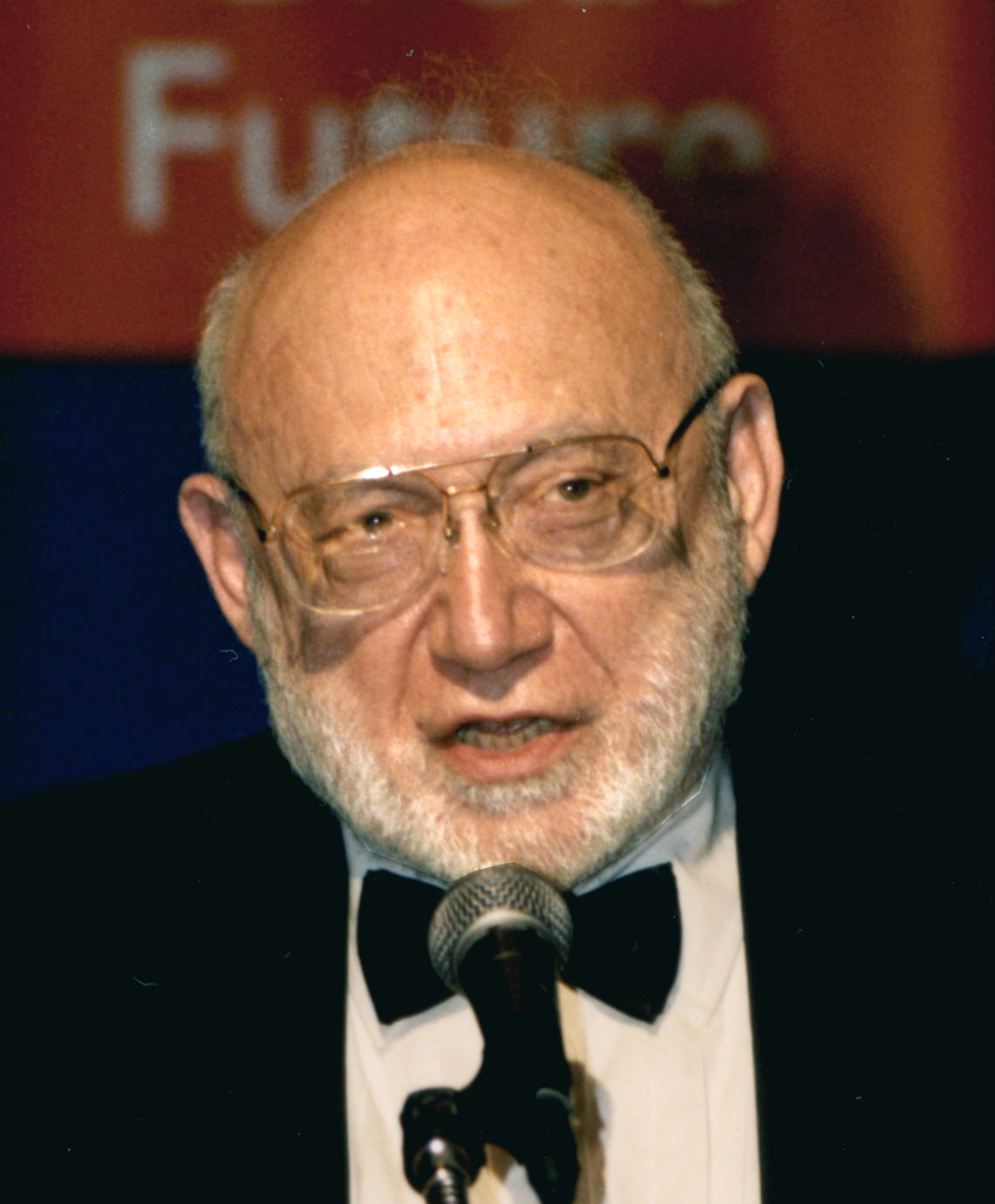
Joshua Lederberg

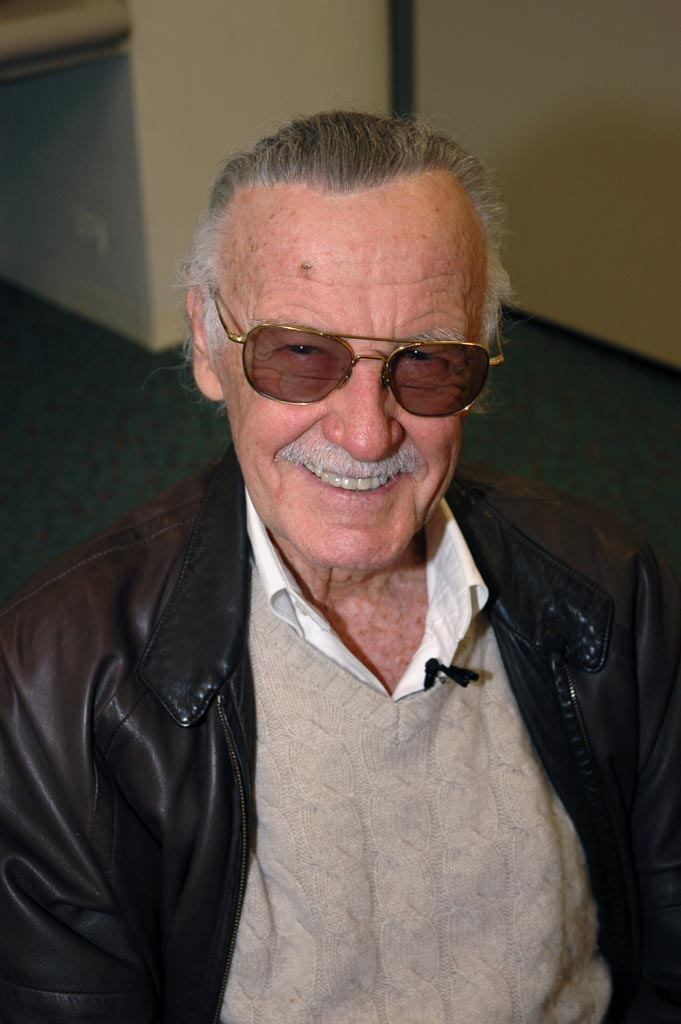
Stan Lee

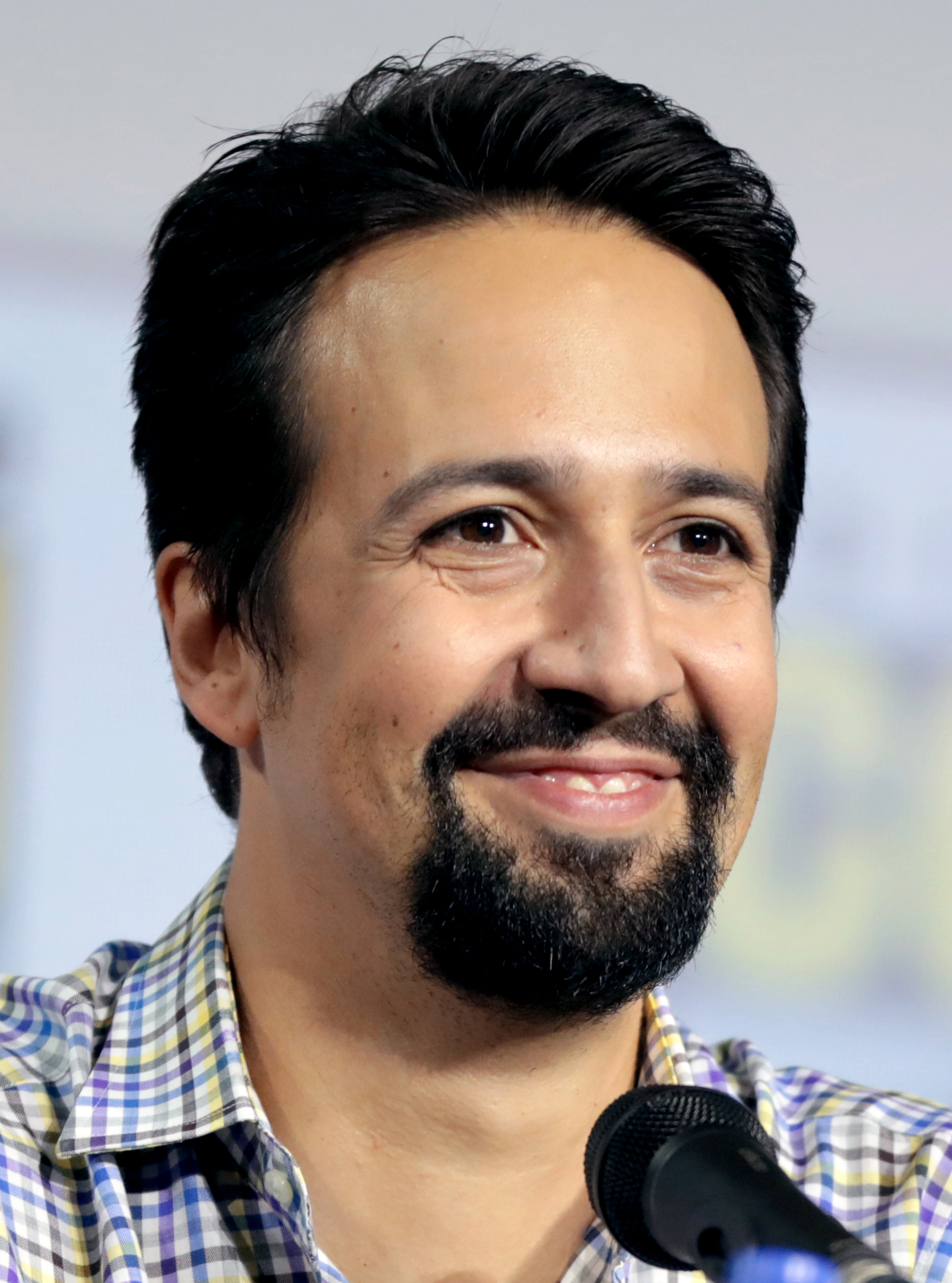
Lin-Manuel Miranda

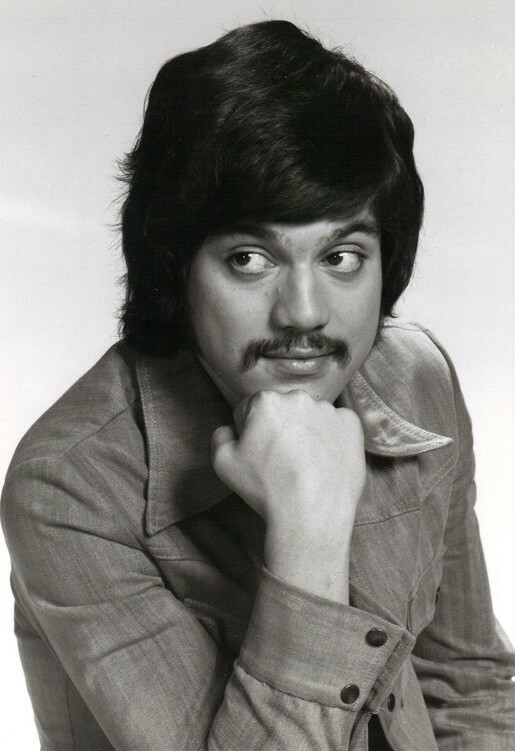
Freddie Prinze

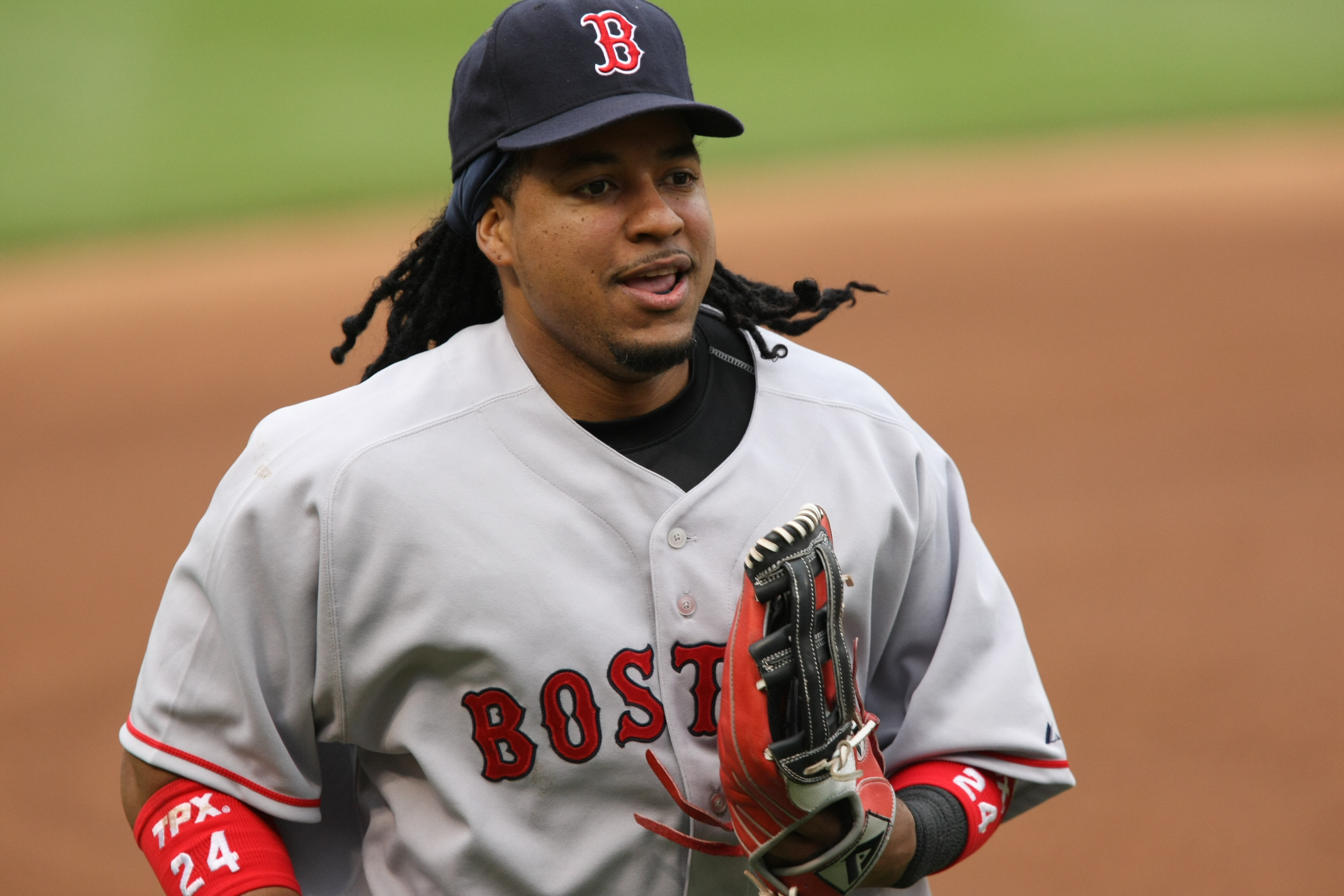
Manny Ramirez

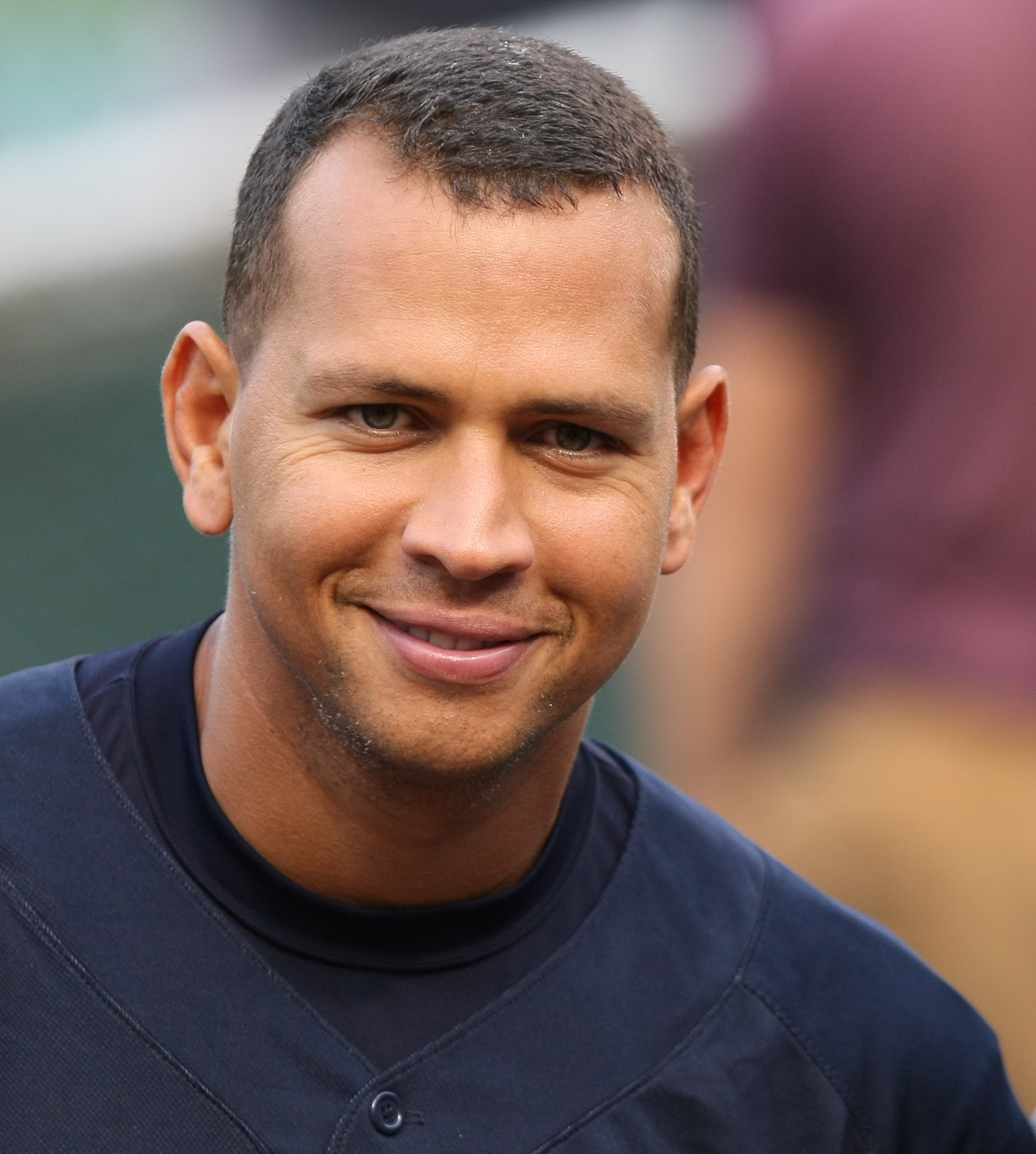
Alex Rodriguez

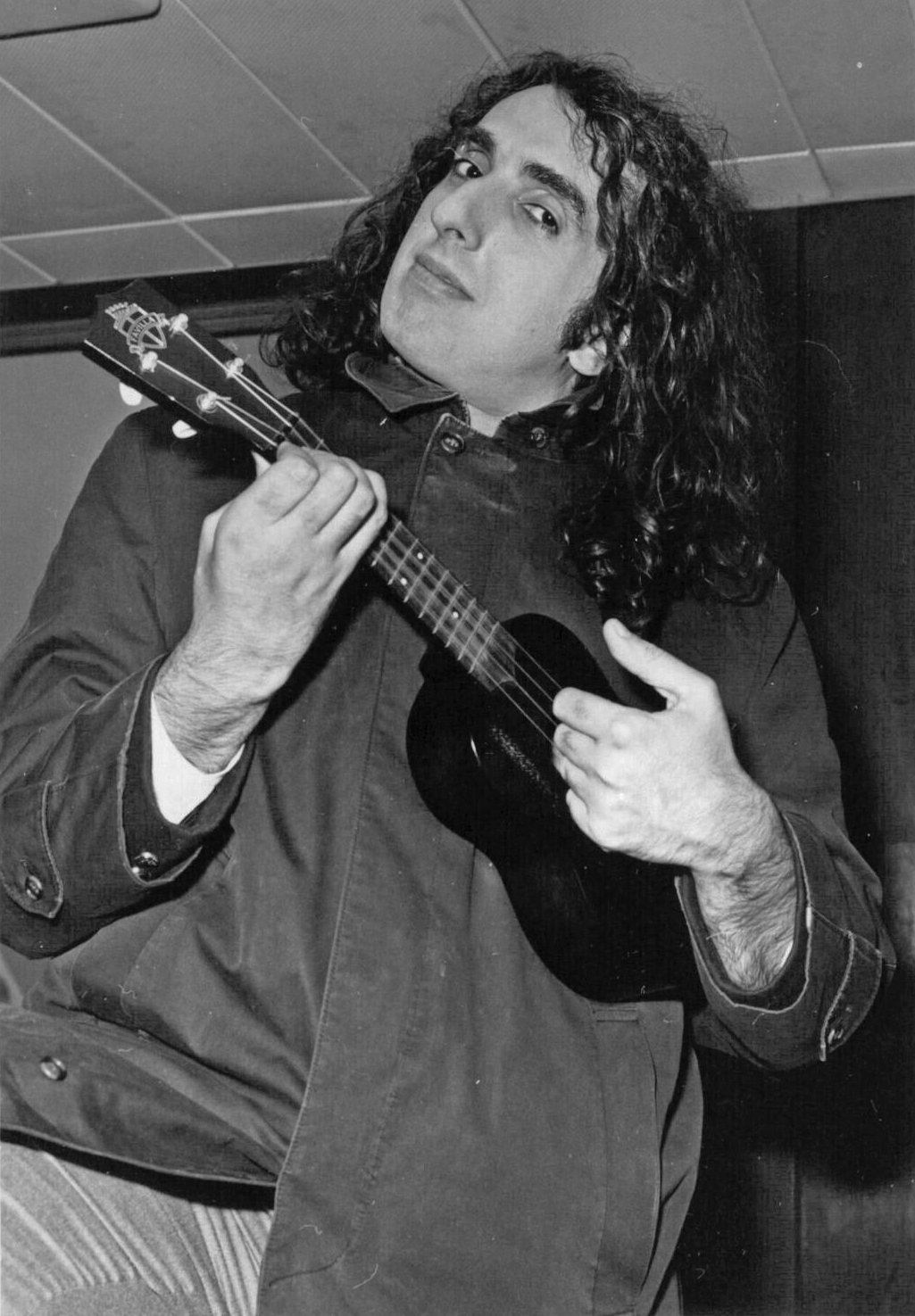
Tiny Tim

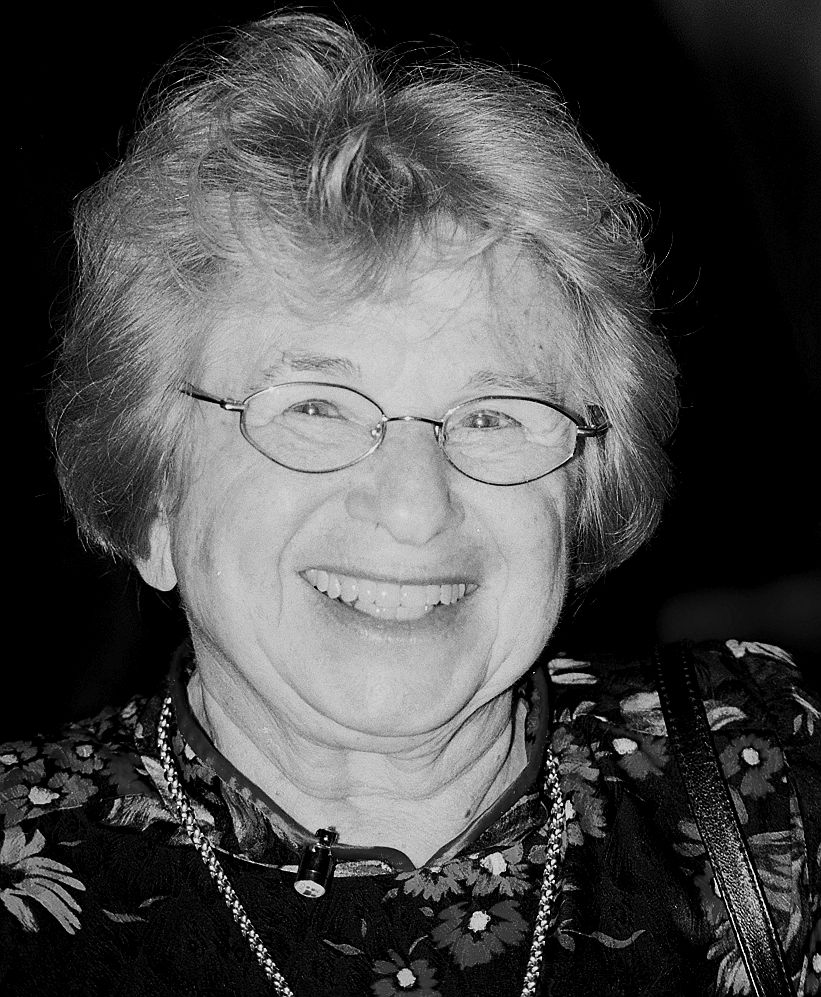
Dr. Ruth

- Pedro Alvarez (born 1987), Dominican-American baseball player who was drafted second overall by the Pittsburgh Pirates in the 2008 Major League Baseball draft; All-Star, NL home run leader, and Silver Slugger Award.
- Alex Arias (born 1967), Dominican-American former Major League Baseball player.
- George Grey Barnard (1863–1938), sculptor.
- Harry Belafonte (1927–2023), calypso singer, actor, and Grammy winner.
- Ward Bennett (1917–2003), designer, artist and sculptor.
- Dellin Betances (born 1988), MLB pitcher for the New York Mets, 4x All Star.
- Jocelyn Bioh, Ghanaian-American writer, playwright, and actress.
- Stanley Bosworth (1927–2011), founding headmaster of Saint Ann's School in Brooklyn, which he headed from 1965 to 2004.
- Tally Brown (1934–1989), singer and actress in films by Andy Warhol and other underground filmmakers.
- Robert John Burke (born 1960), actor.
- Maria Callas (1923–1977), Greek-American opera singer, Grammy Lifetime Achievement Award recipient.
- Cardi B (born 1992), rapper, songwriter, actress and television personality.
- Rod Carew (born 1945), Panamanian-American former Major League baseball player and member of the National Baseball Hall of Fame; 18× All-Star, AL MVP, 7× AL batting champion, AL Rookie of the Year.
- Barry Michael Cooper (1958–2025), writer, screenwriter, producer and director
- Frances Conroy (born 1953), actress, winner of a Golden Globe and four Primetime Emmy Awards.
- Jerry Craft (born 1963), children's book author and illustrator, syndicated cartoonist, and creator of the Mama's Boyz newspaper comic strip; Glyph Award and Newbery Medal .
- Angie Cruz (born 1972), novelist and associate professor at Columbia University
- Nelson Antonio Denis (born 1954), member of the New York State Assembly from 1997 to 2001, attorney, and author.
- Morton Deutsch (1920–2017), social psychologist who was one of the founding fathers of the field of conflict resolution.
- David Dinkins (1927–2020), Mayor of New York City from 1990 to 1994, the first African American to hold the office, New York State Assemblyman, Manhattan borough president.
- Jim Dwyer (1957–2020), columnist and reporter at The New York Times, author; Pulitzer Prize for Commentary and Pulitzer Prize for Spot News Reporting (team).
- Adriano Espaillat (born 1954), Dominican-American U.S. Congressman from 2017 to present, representing Washington Heights and other neighborhoods; the first Dominican-American, and first formerly undocumented immigrant, to serve in Congress; earlier served in the New York State Senate and in the New York State Assembly.
- Laurence Fishburne (born 1961), Academy Award-nominated actor, received six Emmy Awards and one Tony Award.
- Luis Flores (born 1981), Dominican former National Basketball Association point guard; top scorer in the Israel Basketball Premier League.
- Hillel Furstenberg (born 1935), German-born American-Israeli mathematician known for his application of probability theory and ergodic theory methods to other areas of mathematics; Abel Prize, Israel Prize, Harvey Prize, and Wolf Prize.
- Lou Gehrig (1903–1941), nicknamed "the Iron Horse," Major League baseball player for the New York Yankees and member of the National Baseball Hall of Fame; 7× All-Star , 2× AL MVP, 5× AL RBI leader, 3× AL home run leader, AL batting champion, and Triple Crown.
- Elias Goldberg (1886–1978), painter and illustrator, with most of his city paintings focusing on the area of Washington Heights. Goldberg exhibited at the legendary Charles Egan Gallery.
- Leo Gorcey (1917–1969), member of the original cast of "Dead End", and memorably outspoken member of the Dead End Kids / East Side Kids / The Bowery Boys.
- Alan Greenspan (1926–2026), 13th Chairman of the Board of Governors of the Federal Reserve from 1987 to 2006; awarded the Presidential Medal of Freedom, the Department of Defense Medal for Distinguished Public Service, the French Commander of the Legion of Honour, and the Knight Commander of the Order of the British Empire.
- Hex Hector (born 1965), Grammy Award-winning remixer and music producer.
- Eva Hesse (1936–1970), German-born American postminimalist sculptor
- Jacob K. Javits (1904–1986), United States Senator from New York from 1957 to 1981, member of the United States House of Representatives from 1947 to 1954, and Attorney General of New York from 1955 to 1957; Legion of Merit recipient in World War 2; New York City's Javits Center was named in his honor.
- Eliza Jumel (1775–1865), socialite married to Aaron Burr
- Tobi Kahn (born 1952), painter, sculptor, and professor.
- Manfred Kirchheimer (1931–2024), documentary film maker and professor of film, born in the Territory of the Saar Basin
- Henry Kissinger (1923–2023), 7th National Security Advisor from 1969 to 1975, and 56th United States Secretary of State from 1973 to 1977, serving under presidents Richard Nixon and Gerald Ford; awarded the 1973 Nobel Peace Prize; professor; awarded the Bronze Star Medal in World War 2.
- Paul Kolton (1923–2010), chairman of the American Stock Exchange, reporter, mystery writer, and public relations executive .
- Joshua Lederberg (1925–2008), geneticist who received the 1958 Nobel Prize in Physiology or Medicine for work in bacterial genetics, the National Medal of Science, and the Presidential Medal of Freedom.
- Stan Lee (1922–2018), comic book writer, editor, publisher, and producer; Marvel Comics primary creative leader for two decades; creator of Spider-Man, X-Men, and The Incredible Hulk; member of the Will Eisner Award Hall of Fame and the Jack Kirby Hall of Fame, and recipient of the National Medal of Arts.
- Frankie Lymon (1942–1968), rhythm and blues singer and songwriter, dancer, and composer; lead singer of The Teenagers, best known for their hit "Why Do Fools Fall in Love?"
- Lin-Manuel Miranda (born 1980), actor, filmmaker, librettist, composer, and lyricist, best known for writing and acting in the Broadway musicals In the Heights and Hamilton; has won a Pulitzer Prize, five Grammys, three Tony Awards, two Primetime Emmy Awards, and two Olivier Awards.
- Theodore Edgar McCarrick (1930–2025), Cardinal who served as Roman Catholic Archdiocese of Washington (2001–06); dismissed and laicized by Pope Francis in 2019 after being convicted of sexual misconduct.
- Daniel D. McCracken (1930–2011), early computer pioneer, professor, and author.
- Knox Martin (1923–2022), painter, sculptor, muralist, and professor.
- Mims (backronym for Music Is My Savior; stylized as MIMS; born 1981), Jamaican-American rapper.
- Andy Mineo (born 1988), hip hop artist, rapper, singer, producer, video director, and minister signed to Reach Records.
- Karina Pasian (born 1991), recording R&B singer from Def Jam Records, songwriter, and pianist.
- Manny Pérez (born 1969), Dominican-American actor, appeared in tv crime drama series Third Watch and in the film Washington Heights.
- Jim Powers (born 1958), retired professional wrestler best known for his appearances with the World Wrestling Federation from 1987 to 1994.
- Freddie Prinze (1954–1977), Hungarian-Puerto Rican stand-up comedian and actor, best known for his 1970s TV series sitcom Chico and the Man co-starring Jack Albertson.
- Manny Ramírez (born 1972), Dominican-American baseball player from 1993 to 2011, 12x All Star, 9x Silver Slugger Award recipient, AL batting champion, home run leader, and RBI leader.
- Kenny Rankin (1940–2009), folk rock musician, singer, and songwriter.
- Alex Rodriguez (born 1975), Dominican-American baseball player for the New York Yankees, 14x All Star, 10x Silver Slugger Award recipient, 3x AL MVP, 5x AL home run leader, 2x MLB RBI leader, MLB batting champion, 2x Gold Glove Award.
- Thane Rosenbaum (born 1960), novelist, essayist, and law professor.
- James R. Russell (born 1953), scholar, author, and Harvard University professor.
- Merlin Santana (1976–2002), Dominican-American actor and rapper.
- Ronnie Spector (1943–2022), singer
- Vin Scully (1927–2022), sportscaster for the Los Angeles Dodgers for 67 years; inducted into the National Radio Hall of Fame and the NAB Broadcasting Hall of Fame, recipient of the Ford C. Frick Award of the Baseball Hall of Fame and the Presidential Medal of Freedom.
- William "Bill" Shea (1907–1991), lawyer, co-founded the law firm of Shea & Gould, instrumental in the founding of the New York Mets and New York Islanders, namesake of Shea Stadium
- Scott Stringer (born 1960), 44th New York City Comptroller, 26th Borough President of Manhattan, and New York State Assemblyman.
- Allen Swift (1924–2010), actor, writer and magician, best known as a voiceover artist who voiced characters Simon Bar Sinister and Riff-Raff on the Underdog tv cartoon show
- TAKI 183, Greek-American graffitist; has never revealed his full name.
- Tiny Tim (1932–1996), singer, songwriter, and ukulele player, a novelty act of the 1960s best known for his rendition of "Tiptoe Through the Tulips".
- Gina Torres (born 1969), actress, starred in the science fiction series Firefly and its feature film sequel Serenity, in the legal drama series Suits and its spin-off series Pearson, and in the procedural drama television series 9-1-1: Lone Star.
- Leslie Uggams, actress and singer best known for her appearances in the television miniseries Roots and the musical Hallelujah, Baby!, winner of a Tony Award for Best Actress in a Musical and a Daytime Emmy Award.
- George Weinberg (1929–2017), psychologist and author, who coined the term "homophobia" in 1965.
- Joel Westheimer (born 1963), professor of citizenship education at the University of Ottawa
- Ruth Westheimer (1928–2024, born Karola Siegel; known as "Dr. Ruth") German-American sex therapist, talk show host, author, professor, Holocaust survivor, and former Haganah sniper; inducted into the Radio Hall of Fame, and awarded the Planned Parenthood Margaret Sanger Award, the Magnus Hirschfeld Medal, the Ellis Island Medal of Honor, the Leo Baeck Medal, and the Order of Merit of the Federal Republic of Germany.
- Jerry Wexler (1917–2008), music journalist turned music producer who coined the term "Rhythm and blues"; inducted to the Rock and Roll Hall of Fame and the National Rhythm & Blues Hall of Fame.
- Guy Williams (1924–1989), Italian American actor.
- Rafael Yglesias (born 1954), novelist and screenwriter.

== In popular culture ==
- The musical In the Heights, which ran on Broadway from 2008 to 2011, is set in Washington Heights. Its 2021 film adaptation was shot in many Washington Heights locations, including the 191st Street station tunnel.
- The 1968 crime thriller film Coogan's Bluff features a scene in which Clint Eastwood chases the criminal he is to bring back to Arizona through the Cloisters.
- The soap opera Ryan's Hope was set in Washington Heights and aired on ABC from 1975 to 1989.
- The 1993 drama film The Saint of Fort Washington is not entirely geographically accurate, but is set in the neighborhood, with the Fort Washington Avenue Armory playing a large role in the plot.
- The 2002 drama film Washington Heights starring Manny Pérez is the story of a young man trying to escape the cultural barriers of Washington Heights to make it as an illustrator.
- The 2005 documentary Mad Hot Ballroom features students from PS 115 in Washington Heights.
- The 2007 vigilante action-thriller film The Brave One was filmed in some sections of Washington Heights; she and her boyfriend are attacked in a scene filmed in Fort Tryon Park, and the final scene with Terrence Howard was filmed on Ellwood Street between Broadway and Nagle Avenue.
- The 2008 crime drama film Pride and Glory centers on police corruption in a fictional precinct of Washington Heights.
- Parts of the 2010 action thriller film Salt were filmed in the neighborhood, in particular at the 13-story Riviera, a 1910 Beaux-Arts style co-op on 157th Street and Riverside Drive.
- The MTV docu-reality series Washington Heights, which aired in 2013, is set in the neighborhood.
- The 2013 comedy drama film Frances Ha ends with the main character moving to Washington Heights.
- The HBO drama series The Deuce which aired in 2017 to 2019 chose Amsterdam Avenue between 164th and 166th Streets to recreate Times Square.
