= Dominicans in New York City =

Ethnic group

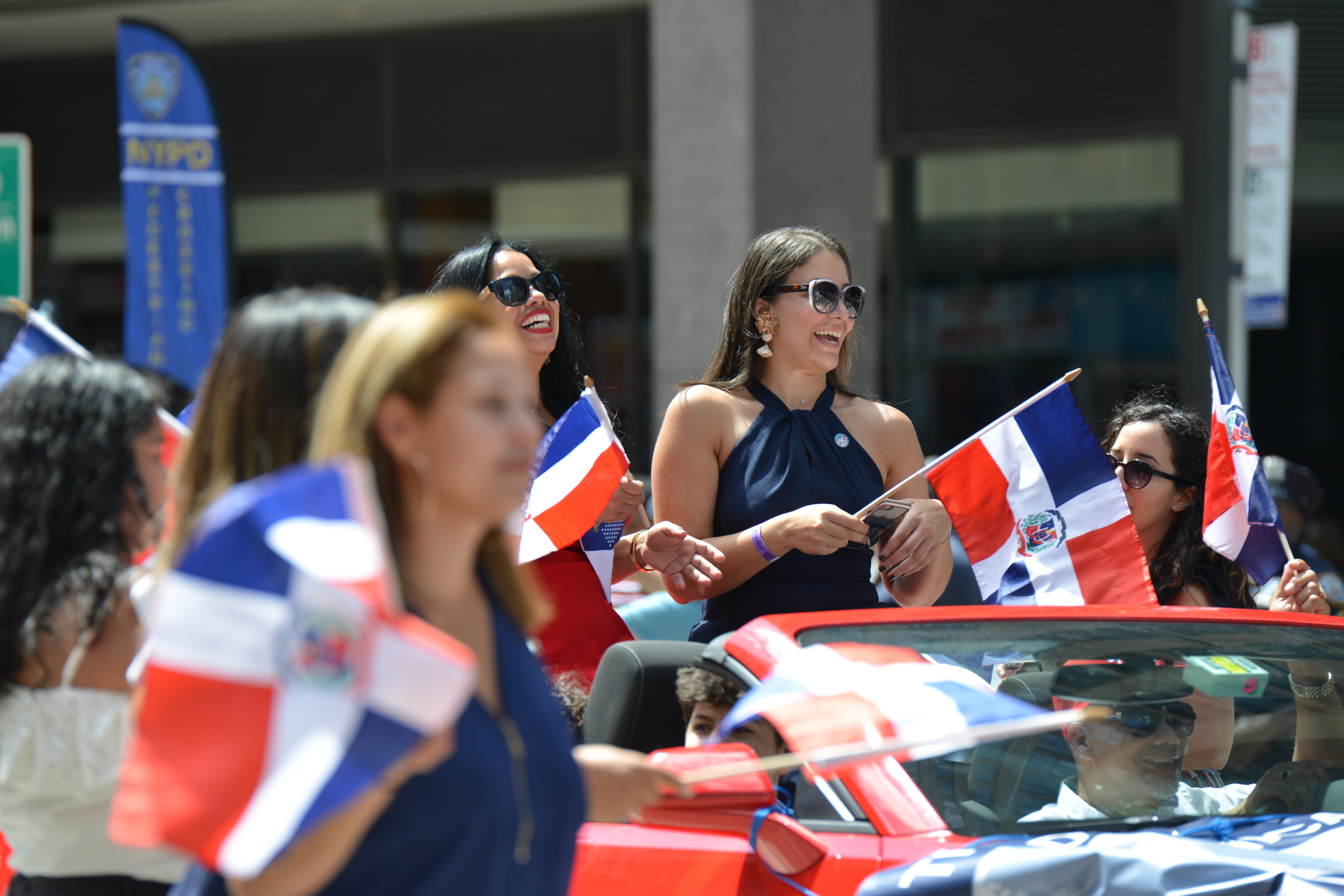
Dominicans in New York City.

The city of New York includes a sizeable Dominican population. Dominicans are one of the largest Hispanic groups in New York City followed by Puerto Ricans. Dominicans were for decades the largest immigrant group in New York City with Chinese New Yorkers coming in second since the 2010s, but in some 2026 articles, there were reports coming out that the Chinese immigrant population has challenged the Dominican immigrant population as the largest immigrant population in the city. Dominicans are concentrated in Washington Heights and the Bronx in the city proper; by 2019, the share living in the city fell from 92% to 62%. The rest lived in outlying counties in the metro area. Census Bureau’s 2019 American Community Survey found that 702,000 Dominicans live in New York City.

== History ==
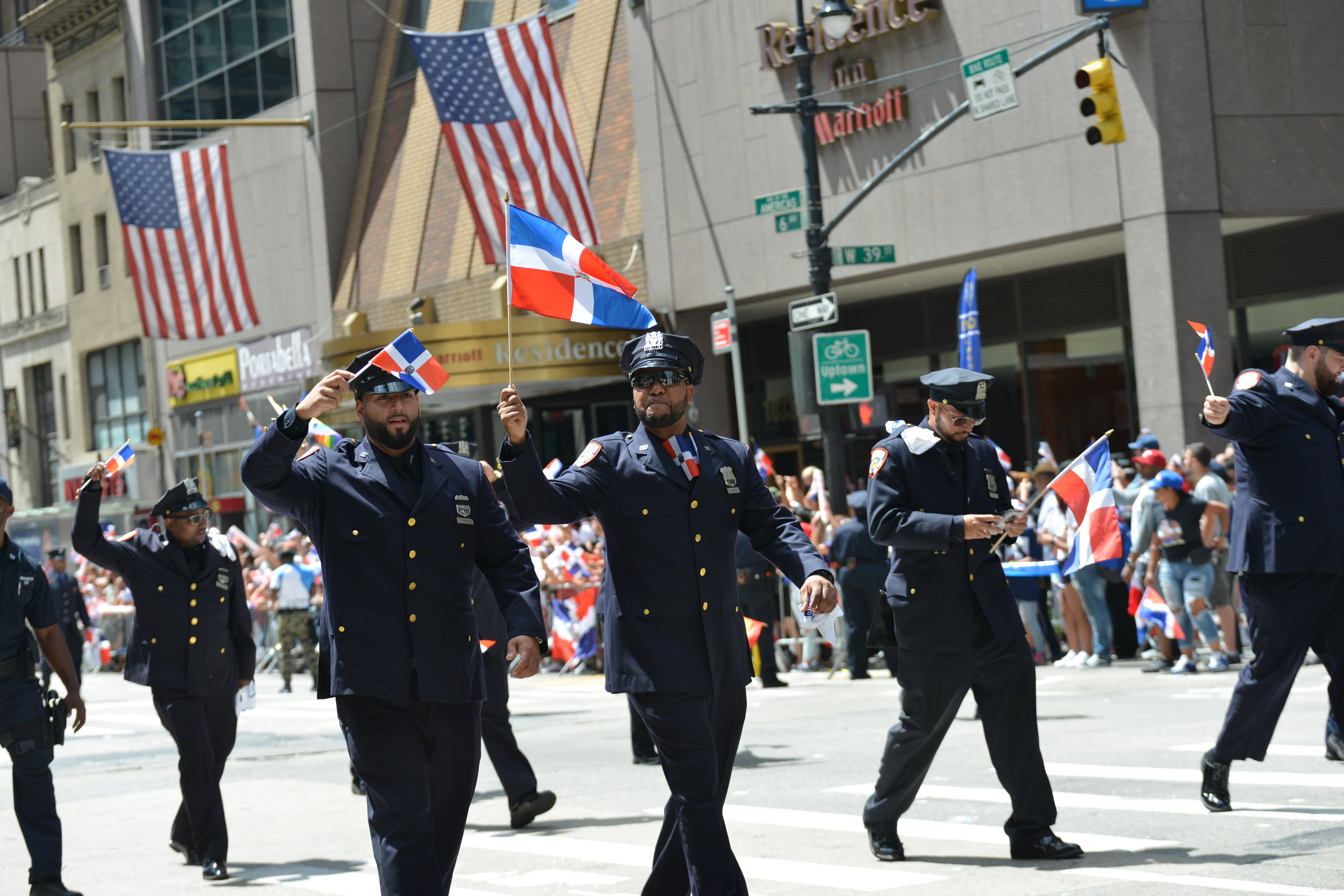
Dominican police officers in New York Dominican day parade.

Immigration records of Dominicans in the United States date from the late 19th century, with New York City having a Dominican community since the 1920s. Large scale immigration of Dominicans began after 1961 onward when dictator Rafael Trujillo died. Other catalysts in Dominican immigration were the invasion of Santo Domingo in 1965, and the regime of Joaquín Balaguer from 1966 to 1978. In part due to these catalysts, starting in the 1970s and lasting until the early 1990s, Dominicans were the largest group of immigrants coming into New York City. Now, Dominicans compose 7% of New York's population and are the largest immigrant group.

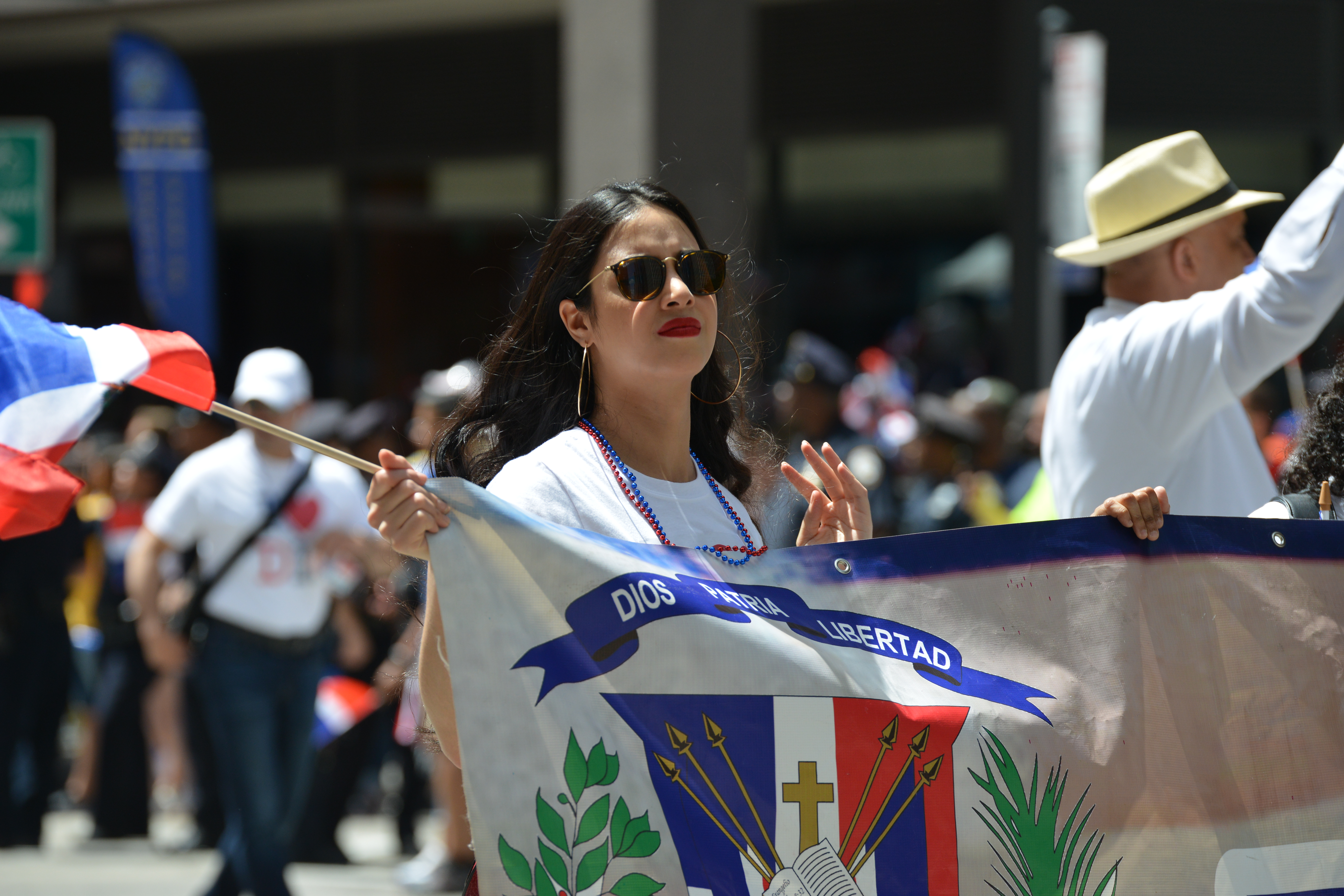
Dominicans in New York city.

The first mass immigration from the Dominican Republic to New York City began in the 1960s. At around 2013, Dominicans surpassed the older and previously larger Puerto Rican population to become the largest Hispanic group in New York City, however Dominicans are still second in the overall New York metropolitan area.

“Dominican migrants arriving in the New York metropolitan region settled primarily in New York City, in Washington Heights and the Bronx. In 1970 92% of all Dominicans living in the region were found in the City although this percentage steadily decreased in each decade until 2019 when 62% lived there, the other 38% in the surrounding counties.

Within the City, the epicenter of Dominican settlement shifted from Washington Heights to the Bronx. By 2019 47% of all Dominicans in the City lived in the Bronx compared with 24% who lived in Manhattan.”

The NYC Dominican population was 702,330 (7.9% of the city) in the 2020 census, representing an increase from the 2010 census number 576,701 (7.0% of the city).

== Enclaves ==
Nearly 70% of Dominican New Yorkers live in the Bronx and Manhattan. In Manhattan, Washington Heights and Inwood are majority Dominican neighborhoods. The Dominican population of Washington Heights is significant, and candidates for political office in the Dominican Republic will run parades up Broadway. In the Bronx, Dominicans are present in large numbers in neighborhoods like Highbridge, University Heights, Morris Heights, Concourse, Kingsbridge, and Fordham. The northwest tip of Upper Manhattan and western portions of Bronx have some of the highest concentrations of Dominicans in the country. In many of these neighborhoods, shops advertise in Spanish and English, the Dominican flag is hung from windows, storefronts, and balconies, and the primary language is Dominican Spanish.

Aside western Bronx neighborhoods, smaller numbers of Dominicans can be seen in other parts of the Bronx. Dominicans can be seen in sizeable numbers in neighborhoods that are dominated by other Hispanic groups, and smaller numbers in predominately black and even white neighborhoods close to Washington Heights/Inwood, such as Harlem, Hamilton Heights, and Upper West Side. Significant numbers of Dominicans move into historically predominant Puerto Rican neighborhoods throughout the city.

In Queens, significant Dominican populations are in Jackson Heights, Elmhurst, Kew Gardens, Corona, East Elmhurst, Woodhaven and Ridgewood. In Brooklyn, significant numbers of Dominicans are in Dyker Heights, Prospect Heights, Fort Greene, Red Hook, Park Slope, Clinton Hill, Bensonhurst, Flatbush, Kensington, Crown Heights, Midwood, Bushwick, Williamsburg, Brownsville, Cypress Hills, Gravesend, Flatlands, Canarsie, Bay Ridge, Sheepshead Bay, Windsor Terrace, Brighton Beach and Sunset Park. In Staten Island, small numbers of Dominicans can be seen scattered in the northern sections of the borough.

=== 2020 NYC Dominican population by borough ===
As of the 2020 United States census, there were 702,330 Dominicans in New York City, representing 7.9% of the city. The 2020 populations and percentages by borough are:

- The Bronx: 334,347 (22.7%)
- Manhattan: 152,409 (8.9%)
- Queens: 105,845 (4.3%)
- Brooklyn: 101,436 (3.7%)
- Staten Island: 8,301 (1.6%)

== Notable New Yorkers of Dominican descent ==
This is an incomplete list of notable New Yorkers of Dominican descent. It includes Dominicans of full ancestry who were born in Dominican Republic and raised in New York or born in New York to Dominican parents, as well as New Yorkers of partial ancestry who have one Dominican parent and one non-Dominican parent.

- Adriana Diaz
- Adriano Espaillat
- Alex Rodriguez
- Angie Cruz
- Arcángel
- AZ
- Cardi B
- Carlos de la Mota
- Carlos Vargas
- Carmen De La Rosa
- Cesar A. Perales
- Charlie Villanueva
- Chep Nuñez
- Christina Mendez
- Clara Ledesma
- Daisy Cocco De Filippis
- Dania Ramirez
- Danielle Polanco
- Darializa Avila Chevalier
- Dascha Polanco
- Denise Vasi
- Elvis Nolasco
- Fabolous
- Fanum
- Félix Sánchez
- Fernando Cabrera
- Francis Capra
- Fulanito
- Gabriela Luna Herrera
- Gilberto Rondón
- Guillermo Linares
- Henry Santos
- Ice Spice
- Jackie Cruz
- James Victor
- Jamila Velazquez
- Jharrel Jerome
- Josefina Baez
- Judy Marte
- Judy Reyes
- Julia Alvarez
- Julian Scott Urena
- Julissa Bermudez
- Julissa Ferreras
- Julissa Reynoso Pantaleón
- Karen Olivo
- Karina Pasian
- Kat DeLuna
- Lenny Santos
- Leslie Grace
- Lorraine Cortés-Vázquez
- Lourdes Benedicto
- Luis Castillo
- Luis García Jr.
- Magic Juan
- Manny Pérez
- Manny Ramirez
- Marisol Alcantara
- Max Santos
- Melanie Martinez
- Merlin Santana
- Miguel A. Núñez Jr.
- Miguel Martinez
- Monica Raymund
- Natti Natasha
- Nelly Rosario
- Nelson Castro
- Olivia Peguero
- Oswald Feliz
- Pedro Álvarez
- Pierina Sanchez
- Prince Royce
- Rafael Espinal
- Ralph Mercado
- Ramona M. Valdez
- Rhenzy Feliz
- Rick Gonzalez
- Robert Uribe
- Roger Sanchez
- Rolando Acosta
- Romeo Santos
- Ronnie Belliard
- Rosanna Tavarez
- Sammy Mejía
- Selenis Leyva
- Shannon Tavarez
- Shaun Abreu
- Silvestre Rasuk
- Stalin Colinet
- The Kid Mero
- Victor Rasuk
- Vladimir Caamaño
- Wilson Jermaine Heredia
- Xaviersobased
- Yasmin Deliz
- Ydanis Rodríguez

== See also ==
- Hispanics and Latinos in New York
- Dominican Day Parade
- Puerto Ricans in New York City
- Caribbean immigration to New York City
- Hispanics and Latinos in New York City
