= Fort George (New York) =

Five forts in colonial New York

- New York, New York
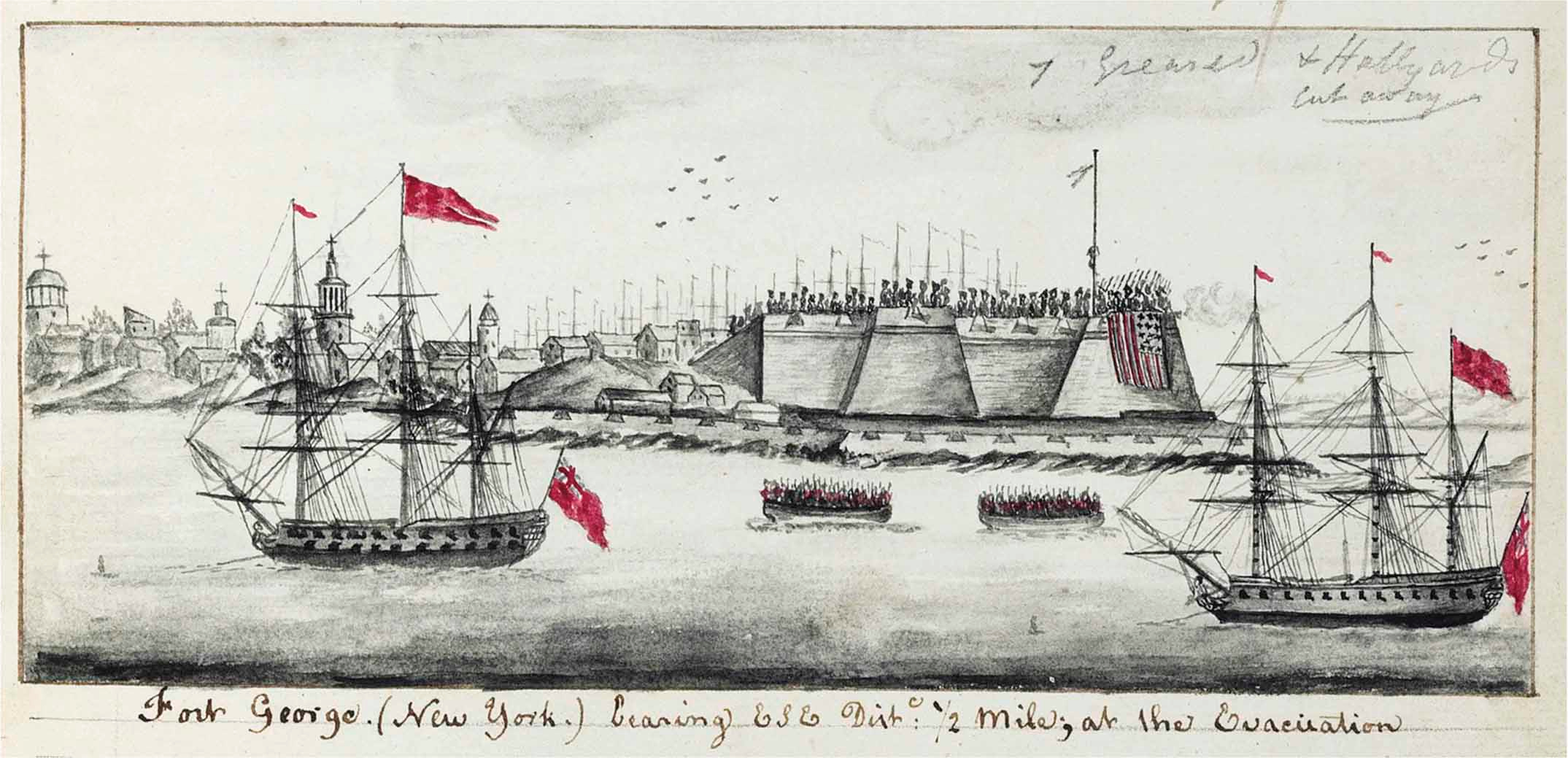
- Fort George, on the day of its evacuation by the British, 24 November 1783

Location
- Coordinates: 40°42′14″N 74°00′49″W

Fort George was the name of five different forts in what is now the state of New York.

== Military forts ==
=== First fort (Lower Manhattan) ===
The first Fort George was built in 1626 in the Dutch colony of New Amsterdam and named Fort Amsterdam. The British Army renamed it Fort James in 1664. It was briefly reoccupied by the Dutch from 1673 to 1674 as Fort Willem Hendrick. The British renamed it Fort William Henry in 1691, Fort Anne or Queen's Fort in 1703, and finally Fort George in 1714. The north side bastions and ramparts were destroyed in the American Revolutionary War in 1776 by the Americans, and finally demolished in 1790. The site is now the location of the Alexander Hamilton U.S. Custom House in Lower Manhattan.

=== Second fort (Oswego, NY) ===
A second Fort George was built by the British in 1755 at Oswego, New York, but it was destroyed by the French commander Louis-Joseph de Montcalm in 1756. The site is now Montcalm Park, bordered by West Schulyer Street, Montcalm Street and West 6th Street.

=== Third fort (Lake George, NY) ===
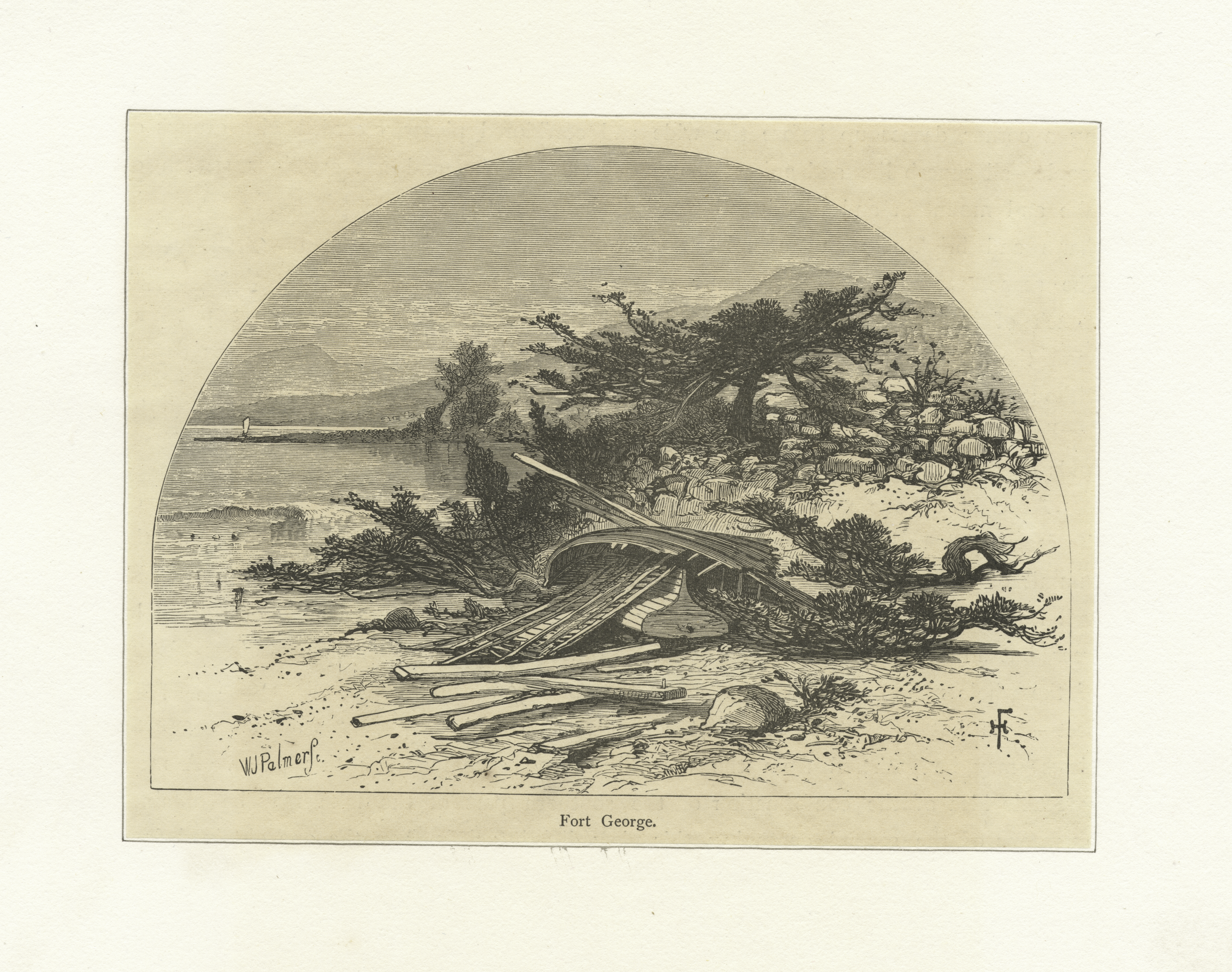
Fort George, Lake George, destroyed

A third Fort George was built in Lake George, New York, in 1755. It was destroyed in 1777 and abandoned in 1780. It was located southeast of Fort William Henry facing Lake George, in the wooded area within Lake George Battlefield Park.

=== Fourth fort (Staten Island) ===
A fourth Fort George was an encampment built on Staten Island around 1777 in the area of St. George, Staten Island, likely Fort Hill. The hill, overlooking the harbor, was the location on Duxbury's Point or Ducksberry Point and was fortified by the British during the American Revolutionary War. Hessian troops, who were contracted by the British, were stationed near the Jersey Street brook (or Hessian Springs).

=== Fifth fort (Upper Manhattan) ===
The last Fort George was built in 1776 in New York City on Fort George Hill, near the current intersection of Audubon Avenue and West 192nd Street in Upper Manhattan. It was briefly named Fort Clinton and finally Fort George.

== Present-day Fort George neighborhood ==
The site of the fifth fort, in upper Manhattan, is on a hill at the northern end of the Washington Heights neighborhood. The site of the fort became a site of a Victorian-era amusement park. From 1895 to 1914, the fort was the site of the Fort George Amusement Park and is now the location of George Washington Educational Campus and part of Highbridge Park. Fort George Hill is also the name of a present-day street that encircles the fort's site.

The area encompassing the hill is also called Fort George, and is considered a sub-neighborhood of Washington Heights. It is sometimes given as West 181st Street to Dyckman Street, other times a smaller north/south area, east of Broadway to the Harlem River. However, the name Fort George is not widely used by New Yorkers and could be considered an example of neighborhood rebranding.

=== Politics ===
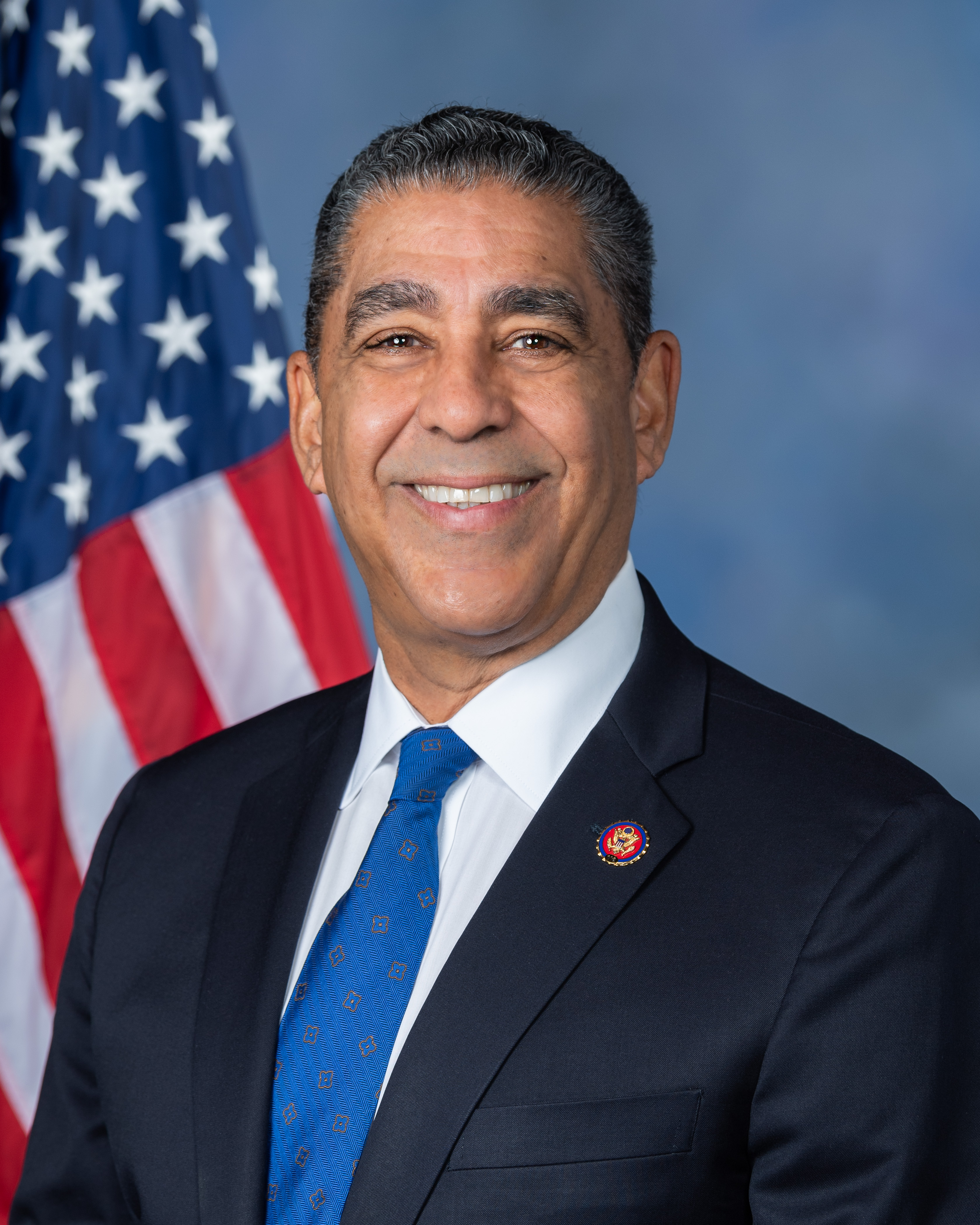
Adriano Espaillat

Politically, Fort George is in New York's 13th congressional district for the U.S. House of Representatives represented by Democrat Adriano Espaillat since 2017. On the state level, it is also part of the 31st New York State Senate District, represented by Democrat Robert Jackson, and the 72nd New York State Assembly district, represented by Democrat Manny De Los Santos. On the city level, the neighborhood is part of the New York City Council 10th district, represented by Democrat Carmen De La Rosa.

== See also ==
- Liberty Boys
