= Gabriela Rosa =

American politician (born 1966)

Member of the New York State Assembly from the 72nd district
- In office January 3, 2013 – June 27, 2014
- Preceded by: Guillermo Linares
- Succeeded by: Guillermo Linares

Personal details
- Born: October 12, 1966 (age 60) Dominican Republic
- Party: Democratic
- Profession: Politician
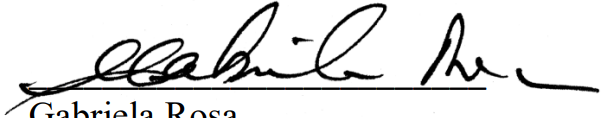
- Signature

Gabriela Rosa (born October 12, 1966) is a Dominican-American former politician. After being elected to the New York State Assembly in 2012, Rosa resigned her office in June 2014 as part of a federal plea deal. A native of the Dominican Republic, Rosa admitted to lying to immigration authorities about a sham marriage. She was sentenced to a year and a day in prison.

== Life and career ==
Born in the Dominican Republic, Rosa settled in New York City in 1994. She served as chief of staff to New York City Councilman Miguel Martinez and also worked for Assemblymember Herman D. Farrell Jr. In 2005, Rosa became a United States citizen.

In 2012, Rosa was elected to the New York State Assembly as a Democrat.

=== Prosecution, guilty plea, and imprisonment ===
On June 27, 2014, Rosa pleaded guilty to two crimes in United States District Court. Rosa admitted to lying about a sham marriage to become a United States citizen and to failing to disclose income and assets in a bankruptcy filing in 2011. Rosa resigned her Assembly seat as part of the plea deal and was later sentenced to a year and a day in prison.
