= Adriano Espaillat =

American politician (born 1954)

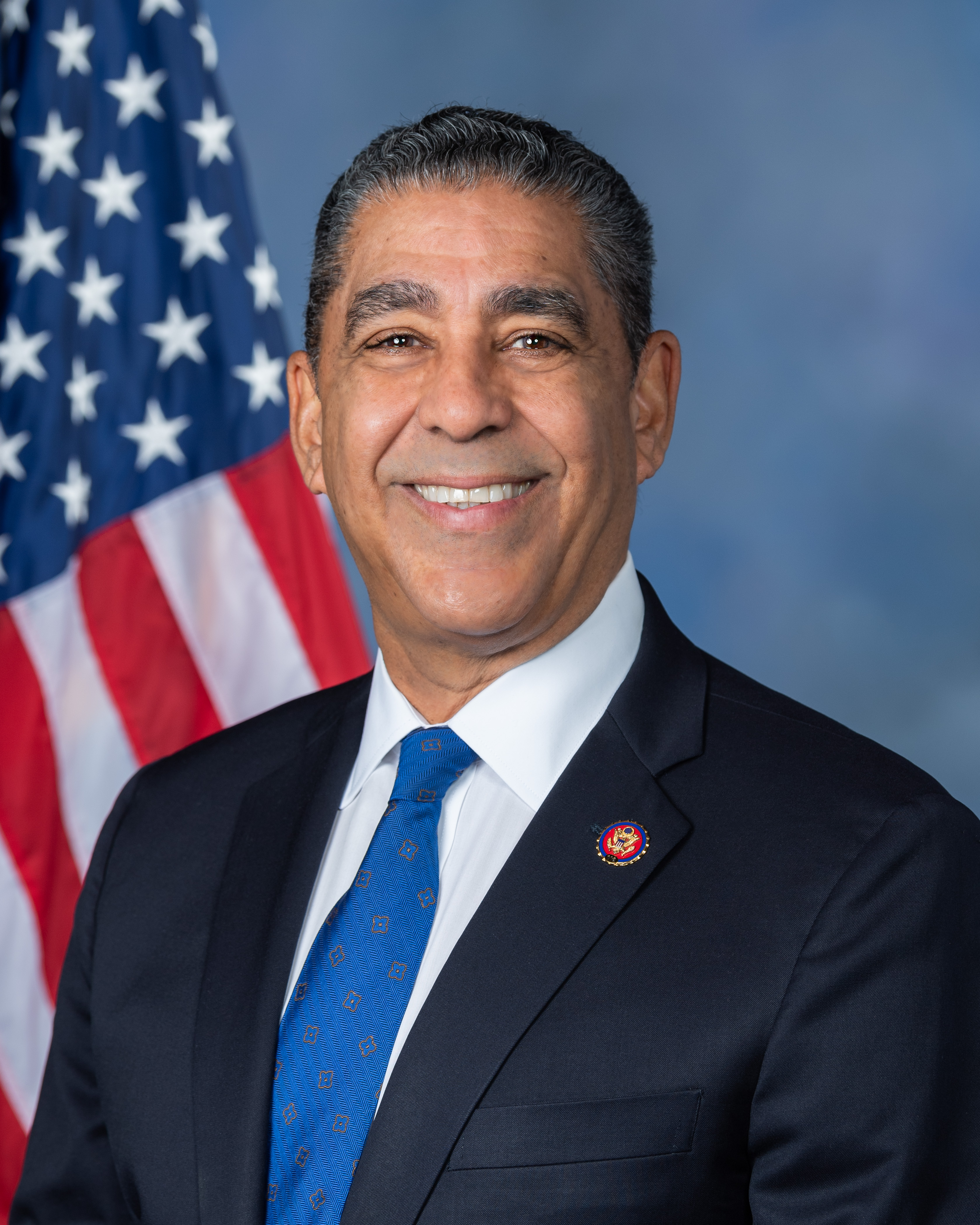
- Official portrait, 2020

Chair of the Congressional Hispanic Caucus
- Incumbent
- Assumed office January 3, 2025
- Preceded by: Nanette Barragán

Member of the U.S. House of Representatives from New York's 13th district
- Incumbent
- Assumed office January 3, 2017
- Preceded by: Charles Rangel

Member of the New York State Senate from the 31st district
- In office January 1, 2011 – December 31, 2016
- Preceded by: Eric Schneiderman
- Succeeded by: Marisol Alcantara

Member of the New York State Assembly from the 72nd district
- In office January 1, 1997 – December 31, 2010
- Preceded by: John Brian Murtaugh
- Succeeded by: Guillermo Linares

Personal details
- Born: Adriano de Jesús Espaillat Rodríguez; September 27, 1954 (age 72) Santiago de los Caballeros, Dominican Republic
- Party: Democratic
- Spouse: Martha Madera (m. 1979)
- Children: 2
- Relatives: Buenaventura Báez (third-great-grandfather); Marcos Antonio Cabral (second-great-grandfather); Mario Fermín Cabral y Báez (great-grandfather); Manuel del Cabral (half cousin); Peggy Cabral (half first cousin-once removed); Gianni Vicini (half second cousin-once removed)
- Education: Queens College (BS)
- Website: House website Campaign website
- Espaillat's voice Espaillat on the Dominican Republic's independence. Recorded February 27, 2020

Adriano de Jesús Espaillat Rodríguez (Note: /ˌɑːdriˈɑːnoʊ ˌɛspaɪˈjɑːt/ AH-dree-AH-noh ESS-py-YAHT; Spanish: [aˈðrjano espajˈʝat]) (born September 27, 1954) is an American politician who has served as the U.S. representative for New York's 13th congressional district since 2017. He is the chair of the Congressional Hispanic Caucus, as well as the first Dominican-American and first formerly undocumented immigrant to serve in Congress. Previously, he served in the New York State Senate from 2011 to 2016 and in the New York State Assembly from 1997 to 2010; he is the first Dominican-born American elected to a state house in the United States. He is a member of the Democratic Party.

While a member of the New York State Senate, Espaillat was a ranking member of the Housing, Construction, and Community Development Committee, and chaired the Senate Latino Caucus. He represented the neighborhoods of Washington Heights, Morris Heights, Marble Hill, Inwood, Kingsbridge, and Fort George. He continues to broadly represent these neighborhoods in Congress, as well as Harlem, East Harlem, Hamilton Heights, Morningside Heights, Fordham, and part of the Upper West Side.

Espaillat was first elected to Congress in 2016, after incumbent representative Charles Rangel announced his retirement from Congress. He had previously run for the seat in 2012 and 2014, challenging Rangel in the Democratic primaries. In 2026, Espaillat lost re-nomination in the Democratic primary to democratic socialist Darializa Avila Chevalier.

== Early life and education ==
Espaillat was born on September 27, 1954, in Santiago, Dominican Republic, to Melba (née Rodríguez) and Ulises Espaillat. His father was named after 19th-century liberal Dominican president Ulises Espaillat.

He and his family moved to the United States in 1964, when he was nine years old. After overstaying a tourist visa and thus becoming undocumented immigrants, the Espaillats petitioned for green cards, which they received the following year, becoming lawful permanent residents of the U.S. in 1965. His father ultimately purchased a gas station, where Espaillat assisted.

Espaillat grew up in Washington Heights, Manhattan, in New York City. He graduated from Bishop Dubois High School in 1974. He earned a B.S. degree in political science from Queens College, City University of New York in 1978. He is a member of the Phi Beta Sigma fraternity.

== Early career ==
From 1980 to 1988, Espaillat served as the Manhattan Court Services Coordinator for the New York City Criminal Justice Agency, a nonprofit organization that provides indigent legal services and works to reduce unnecessary pretrial detention and post-sentence incarceration costs. As a state-certified conflict resolution mediator and volunteer with the Washington Heights Inwood Conflict Resolutions and Mediation Center, Espaillat helped resolve hundreds of conflicts. He also served on New York Governor Mario Cuomo's Dominican-American Advisory Board from 1991 to 1993.

From 1992 to 1994, he worked as director of the Washington Heights Victims Services Community Office, an organization offering counseling and other services to families of victims of homicides and other crimes. For the next two years, he served as the director of Project Right Start, a national initiative funded by the Robert Wood Johnson Foundation to combat substance abuse by educating the parents of preschool children. Before his election to the New York State Assembly, Espaillat served on Manhattan Community Board 12 and was president of the 34th Police Precinct Community Council in Washington Heights.

== New York State Assembly (1997–2010) ==
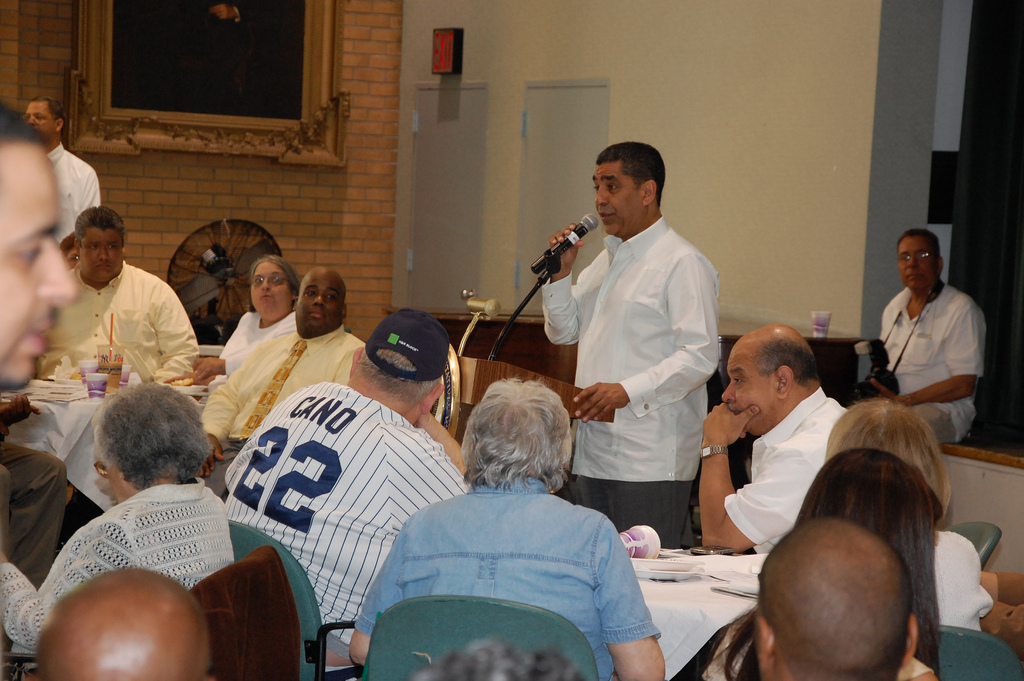
Espaillat speaking at a town hall meeting, 2010

=== Elections ===
Espaillat served in the New York State Assembly from 1997 to 2010. He was elected in 1996 in New York State Assembly District 72, defeating 16-year incumbent John Brian Murtaugh in the Democratic primary by 81% to 12%, after The New York Times endorsed him, writing: "Espaillat is an energetic and ambitious district leader who has a background in victim services and drug prevention, as well as an impressive grasp of neighborhood and state issues", and opined that he "holds more promise for the future". Espaillat became the first Dominican-born member of the New York State Legislature, as well as the first Dominican elected to a state house in the United States. He chaired the Black, Puerto Rican, Hispanic & Asian Legislative Caucus, and committees on small business and children & families.

He won again in 1998, after The New York Times endorsed him writing "Espaillat ... has made a good start in Albany and deserves more time to pursue issues of concern to his district". He won with 65% of the vote in the Democratic primary, and 92% of the vote in the general election. In 2004 he won again, this time with 92% of the vote in the general election.

In 2008, Espaillat was endorsed by New York City Mayor Michael Bloomberg, who said: "Adriano has been a clear voice for our environments and against entrenched special interests and shortsighted parochial concerns. It is exactly this kind of independent leadership that we need to send back to Albany." The New York Times endorsed him as well, writing: "Mr. Espaillat has united blacks and Hispanics in Albany, and he has spoken out for thousands who were being evicted as developers sought higher rents." He was also endorsed by District Council 37, New York City's largest public sector employee union. Espaillat defeated Miguel Martinez in the Democratic primary, and then Republican Bill Buran in the general election, 94% to 6%.

=== Tenure ===
In the Assembly, Espaillat advocated for tenants, consumers, veterans, immigrants, and local businesses. He voted for laws encouraging the construction and preservation of affordable housing for low- and moderate-income residents and giving low-income day care workers the right to organize and obtain health care, and he sponsored measures to improve hospital translation services. He also established a higher education scholarship fund for relatives of the victims of American Airlines Flight 587, which crashed on November 12, 2001; many of those killed had lived in Washington Heights. Espaillat supported efforts in 2007 to allow undocumented immigrants to obtain driver's licenses.

After a wave of assaults and murders of livery cab drivers in 2000 that left more than 10 dead, Espaillat supported legislation strengthening penalties for violent crimes against livery drivers and to enable their families to receive New York State Crime Victims Board funding. Livery cabs work in less affluent neighborhoods of New York City that typically lack access to yellow cabs. Espaillat also took legal action against power utility Con Edison after equipment failures led to a two-day blackout in Upper Manhattan in July 1999, which he alleged caused financial damage to restaurants, bodegas, and other small businesses. Con Edison subsequently agreed to invest an additional $100 million in Upper Manhattan electrical infrastructure, at no cost to ratepayers, and was required to refund customers billed for expenses related to the blackout.

== New York State Senate (2011–2016) ==
=== Elections ===
==== 2010 ====
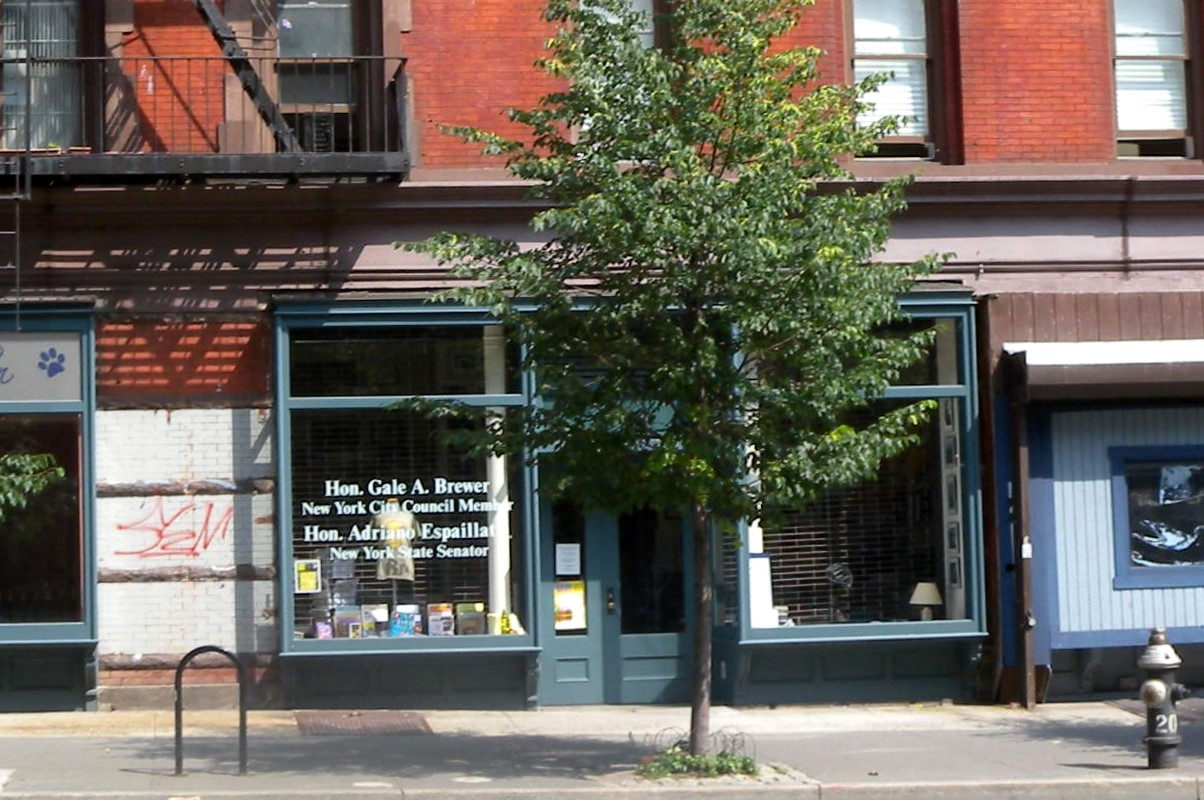
Office on Columbus Avenue

Espaillat ran for the New York State Senate District 31, located in Northern Manhattan and the Bronx, in 2010, after incumbent Eric Schneiderman announced that he was stepping down to seek election as New York Attorney General. The New York Times endorsed Espaillat, noting that he was "a 14-year Albany veteran, who has been an outspoken voice for the most crucial reform of all – an independent redistricting commission to create fairer elections in the state. If Mr. Espaillat works hard to represent this diverse district, he could become an important leader in Albany as well as a proud model for Hispanics." He was also endorsed by Mayor Bloomberg and U.S. Representative Charles Rangel.

Espaillat received more than 50% of the vote in a four-way Democratic party primary, defeating Mark Levine among others. He won the general election with more than 84% of the vote.

In 2012, Espaillat won again, defeating then-Assemblyman Guillermo Linares 62%-38% in the Democratic primary.

==== 2014 ====
After losing to 21-term incumbent Charles Rangel in the Democratic primary for U.S. Congress, Espaillat announced his candidacy for reelection to his New York State Senate seat, facing former city councilman Robert Jackson. He was reelected with 50.3% of the vote to Jackson's 42.7%.

=== Tenure ===
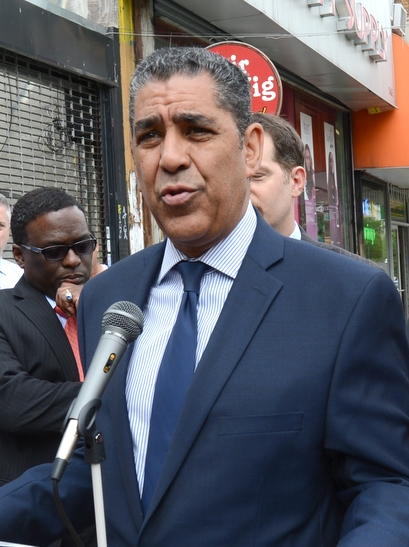
Adriano Espaillat in 2014.

In 2011, according to the Daily News, Espaillat led the fight to safeguard and strengthen rent regulation for over 1 million affordable housing apartments that was set to expire that year.

Espaillat also helped pass legislation increasing enforcement against businesses that sell alcohol to minors. Further, he authored the Notary Public Advertising Act, to crack down on public notaries who prey on vulnerable immigrants by offering fraudulent legal services.

He voted in favor of marriage equality legislation in 2011. That same year, Espaillat sponsored a bill requiring employment agencies to prominently post information about the rights of applicants for employment, saying that many immigrants did not know to whom to turn for assistance.

In 2014, The New York Times noted about his political career:

Espaillat has spent his 18 years in the State legislature mostly fighting for tenants, day-care staff and farmworkers. He has pushed for in-state tuition at public universities for undocumented children, called for a repeal of exorbitant tax breaks for expensive apartment buildings, and has strongly supported immigrants' rights.

=== State Senate committee assignments ===
Espaillat served on the following New York State Senate committees:

- Housing, Construction & Community Development (ranking Member)
- Environmental Conservation
- Higher Education
- Codes
- Rules
- Judiciary
- Finance
- Insurance

== U.S. House of Representatives (2017–present) ==
=== Elections ===
==== 2012 ====
In 2012, Espaillat ran in the Democratic primary for New York's 13th congressional district, in a field that included 42-year incumbent veteran Charles Rangel. The seat had long been a majority-black district, but redistricting after the 2010 census made it a 55% Hispanic-majority district. Espaillat received endorsements from among others former Bronx borough presidents Fernando Ferrer and Adolfo Carrión Jr., former congressman Herman Badillo, and New York State Senator from the Bronx Gustavo Rivera.

Rangel narrowly defeated Espaillat, receiving 44% of the vote to Espaillat's 42%. The margin of victory was fewer than 1,000 votes. Espaillat carried the Bronx portion of the district and several areas in Upper Manhattan. The election was marked by accusations that Spanish-speaking voters were either turned away at the polls or required to use affidavit ballots. The New York City Board of Elections was criticized for poor handling of the election and subsequent legal proceedings.

==== 2014 ====
2014 Democratic primary results by precinct Rangel: 40–50%; 50–60%; 60–70%; 70–80%; 80–90%; Espaillat: 40–50%; 50–60%; 60–70%; 70–80%; 80–90%; 90–100%; Walrond, Jr.: 40–50%; Tie 40–50% No votes Interactive map version

In 2014, Espaillat ran against Rangel again. He was endorsed by The New York Times. He was also endorsed by (among others) Bronx borough president Ruben Diaz Jr., Bronx Democratic chairman Assemblyman Carl Heastie, New York City Comptroller Scott Stringer, former New York City Comptroller Bill Thompson, and Speaker of the New York City Council Melissa Mark-Viverito. He lost to Rangel again in the primary, this time 47.7% to 43.1%.

==== 2016 ====
2016 Democratic primary results by precinct Espaillat: 20–30%; 30–40%; 40–50%; 50–60%; 60–70%; 70–80%; 80–90%; Wright: 20–30%; 30–40%; 40–50%; 50–60%; 60–70%; 70–80%; 80–90%; Williams: 20–30%; 30–40%; 40–50%; Powell: 30–40%; Tie: 20–30%; 30–40%; No votes Interactive map version

In November 2015, Espaillat announced that he would give up his New York State Senate seat to run for Congress again. He was running for an open seat; Rangel had announced that he would not seek a 22nd term in 2016. In the Democratic primary, Espaillat narrowly defeated his nearest challenger, state assemblyman Keith L. T. Wright, with 36% of the vote. Espaillat won the general election with 89% of the vote.

When Espaillat took office on January 3, 2017, he became the first formerly undocumented immigrant ever elected to the United States Congress, and the first Dominican-American to be elected to Congress. He also became only the third person to represent what is now the 13th congressional district in 72 years. Adam Clayton Powell Jr. held the district from 1945 to 1971; Rangel had won the seat after defeating Powell in the 1970 primary.

==== 2018 ====
Espaillat ran for a second term and defeated Republican Jineea Butler in the general election, winning 95% of the vote.

==== 2020 ====
Espaillat ran for a third term and defeated Republican Lovelynn Gwinn in the general election, winning 91% of the vote.

==== 2022 ====
Espaillat ran for a fourth term and was unopposed in the general election.

==== 2024 ====
Espaillat ran for a fifth term and defeated Republican Ruben Vargas in the general election, winning 84% of the vote.

==== 2026 ====
2026 Democratic primary results by precinct Avila Chevalier: 40–50%; 50–60%; 60–70%; 70–80%; Espaillat: 40–50%; 50–60%; 60–70%; 70–80%; 80–90%; 90–100%

Espaillat ran for his sixth term in Congress in the 2026 United States House of Representatives elections for New York's 13th congressional district. For the Democratic nomination, he was successfully challenged by Democratic Socialist newcomer Darializa Avila Chevalier.

He was endorsed by U.S. representatives Greg Casar (TX-35), Maxwell Frost (FL-10), Pramila Jayapal (WA-07), Nydia Velázquez (NY-07); New York State legislators George Alvarez, Manny De Los Santos, and Yudelka Tapia; and New York City Council members Shaun Abreu, Carmen De La Rosa, Elsie Encarnacion, Oswald Feliz, Christopher Marte, and Julie Menin (speaker of the Council).

Labor unions that endorsed Espaillat included the Communication Workers of America District 1, District Council 37, New York City Central Labor Council, New York State AFL-CIO, New York State Nurses Association, New York State United Teachers, and NYC District Council of Carpenters. Other organizations that endorsed him included Congressional Black Caucus PAC, Congressional Progressive Caucus PAC, Jim Owles Liberal Democratic Club, League of Conservation Voters Action Fund, Planned Parenthood Action Fund, Population Connection, and Stonewall Democratic Club of New York.

Espaillat was also supported by AIPAC, a pro-Israel lobby group that has long endorsed him, and which spent $145,000 in support of Espaillat. AIPAC-associated donors spent significantly more to oppose Avila Chevalier, although the exact amount will not be known until after the election.

=== Tenure ===
Espaillat is Chair of the Congressional Hispanic Caucus (CHC), Co-Chair of the Latino-Jewish Caucus, and a member of the Progressive Caucus.

==== 2017–19 ====
In August 2017, after the 2017 Unite the Right rally in Charlottesville, Virginia, Espaillat and Pennsylvania Representative Dwight E. Evans introduced legislation banning Confederate monuments on federal property.

Prior to 2017, no one had attempted to be in both the Congressional Black Caucus (CBC) and the CHC. In the 2016 House elections, after Espaillat defeated Rangel in the Democratic primary. Espaillat, an Afro-Latino, signaled that he wanted to join the CBC as well as the CHC, but it was reported that he was rebuffed.

In 2018 Espaillat said: "ICE has become a runaway train and ... it is not implementing or enforcing the law in a humane way or in the tradition that characterizes America." He suggested creating two new agencies to replace ICE, one to aggressively police human and drug trafficking and gang violence, and another to more narrowly address asylum seekers and other immigrants inside the U.S.

In March 2019, Espaillat and 29 other Democratic lawmakers wrote U.S. Secretary of State Mike Pompeo a letter that read in part, "Since the election of far-right [Brazilian] candidate Jair Bolsonaro as president, we have been particularly alarmed by the threat Bolsonaro's agenda poses to the LGBTQ+ community and other minority communities, women, labor activists, and political dissidents in Brazil."

In December 2019, he voted for the impeachment of President Donald Trump.

==== 2020–24 ====
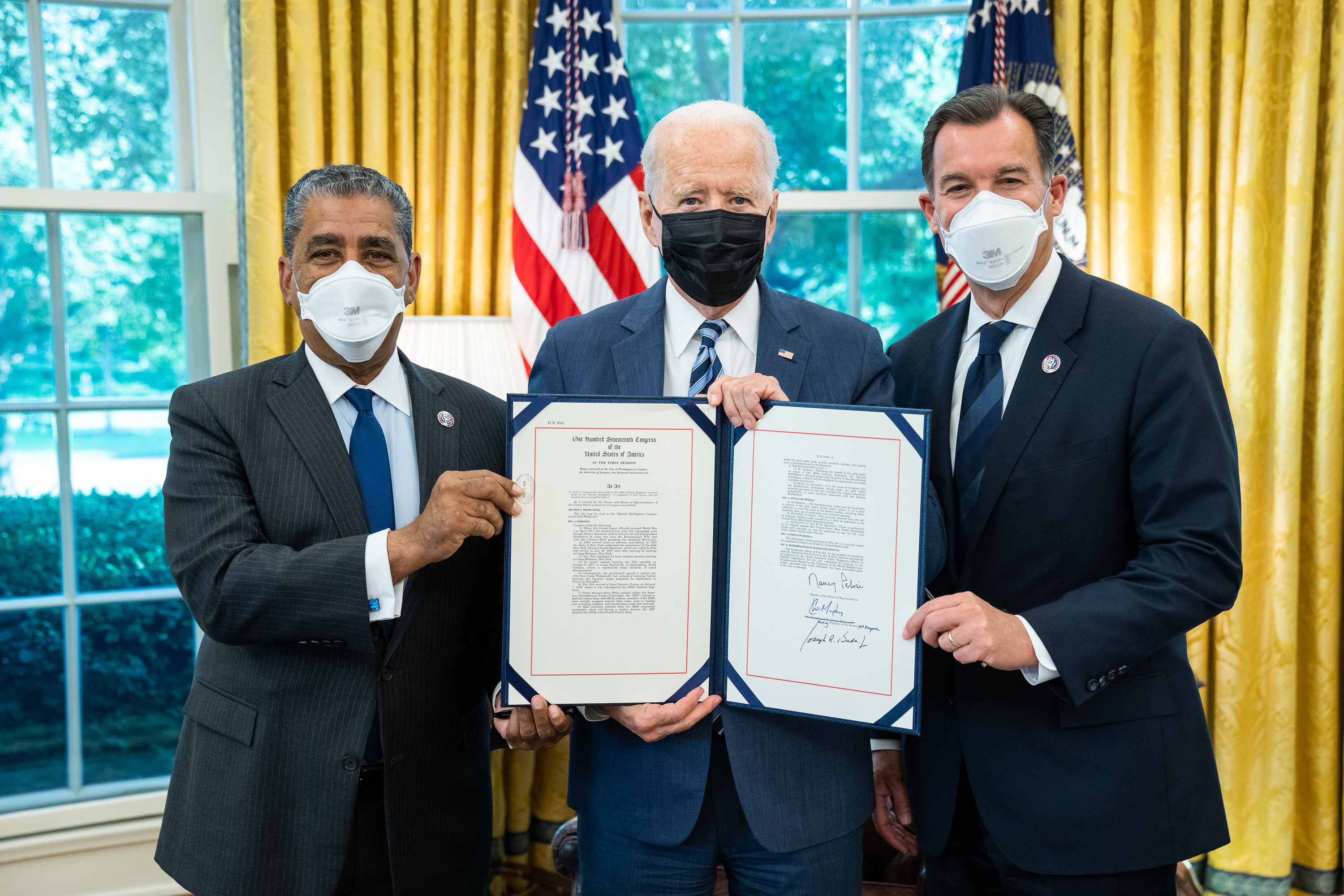
Espaillat with President Joe Biden and Tom Suozzi in 2021

In July 2020, two Revel rideshare electric moped riders died in accidents in New York City. Espaillat wrote to the New York State Department of Motor Vehicles, asking New York City and New York State officials to stop Revel from operating. Revel suspended its operations in New York City.

In January 2021, amid the COVID-19 pandemic in New York City, Espaillat advocated mask-wearing, saying: "There is no singular panacea and we must adjust our daily habits and practices for our own health and safety as well as the health and safety of those around us". In August 2021, he called for New York City to require movie theaters, bars, and gyms to require proof of a Covid vaccination for a patron to enter, or else proof that the person had received a negative Covid-19 test result within the prior 72 hours, saying: "New Yorkers deserve to have the assurance that somebody that is next to them, in a confined area, has vaccinated themselves or has tested negative."

That same month, he again voted for the impeachment of President Donald Trump.

Espaillat co-sponsored legislation to award the Congressional Gold Medal to the Harlem Hellfighters, an infantry regiment of the New York Army National Guard during World War I and World War II that mainly consisted of African Americans. The medal was awarded to the regiment in August 2021, in recognition of their bravery and outstanding service during World War I.

In January 2023, Espaillat introduced a resolution (H.Res.28) condemning the U.S. Supreme Court's decision to overturn Roe v. Wade and Planned Parenthood v. Casey, as well as committing to advancing reproductive justice and judicial reform. On February 1, 2023, Espaillat was named Ranking Member of the Legislative Branch Subcommittee of the House Appropriations Committee. The same month, Espaillat introduced a bill (H.R 1124) which would abolish the death penalty under Federal law.

In 2023, Espaillat introduced a bill in Congress to authorize a coin commemorating former baseball Hall of Fame player Roberto Clemente. In 2025, Espaillat co-sponsored reintroduction of the bill. The legislation has been referred to the House Committee on Financial Services, and is awaiting a vote to head back to the House floor.

==== 2025–present ====
Since being elected to Congress, Espaillat has sought to build a network of Dominican elected officials in and around his district, frequently dubbed "The Squadriano" (a portmanteau of "Adriano" and "the Squad"). It includes among others New York City Council member Oswald Feliz. Espaillat is a member of the Vote Blue Coalition, a federal PAC created to support Democrats in New York, New Jersey, and Pennsylvania through voter outreach and mobilization efforts.

Following his being elected to a fifth term, Espaillat was elected as the first Black chair of the CHC in November 2024. He is also Chair of the Congressional Hispanic Caucus.

In June 2025, Espaillat and Congresswoman Nydia Velázquez were barred from entering a federal detention center on the 10th floor of the Jacob K. Javits Federal Building in Manhattan to check on people who had been detained in immigration raids or in protests against the raids, and to investigate claims of overcrowding, extreme heat, and people sleeping on bathroom floors. Espaillat said: "Today, ICE violated all of our rights. We deserve to know what’s going on on the 10th floor.” Subsequently, Espaillat was allowed to visit the facility, and said that it was clean, but that he thought that it had been cleaned up in anticipation of his visit.

=== Committee assignments ===
- Committee on Appropriations
  - Subcommittee on the Legislative Branch (Ranking member)
  - Subcommittee on Transportation, Housing and Urban Development, and Related Agencies
- Committee on the Budget

=== Caucus leadership ===
- Congressional Hispanic Caucus, chair
- Latino-Jewish Caucus, co-chair

=== Caucus memberships ===
- Congressional Caucus for the Equal Rights Amendment
- Congressional Progressive Caucus
- Labor Caucus
- Medicare for All Caucus
- Expand Social Security Caucus
- LGBT Equality Caucus
- Congressional Ukraine Caucus
- Black Maternal Health Caucus
- Steel Caucus

== Political positions ==
=== Affordable housing ===
Espaillat is an advocate of affordable housing. In a 2026 endorsement, U.S. Representative Gregory Meeks said: "At a time when working families are being priced out of neighborhoods they’ve called home for generations, Adriano has been on the front lines of the fight to make New York City more affordable." The Congressional Black Caucus PAC said in an endorsement that its decision was in part due to Espaillat's work to fund affordable housing.

=== Economic development ===
He is an advocate of economic development. For example, Espaillat supported the Kingsbridge Armory redevelopment in the Bronx, a plan – backed by $216 million in city, state, and federal investments – to turn the decommissioned Kingsbridge Armory into a community-centered hub that, in phase one, is planned to have a venue space for entertainment, recreation, cultural and commercial space, light industrial manufacturing space, and 25,000 square feet of community space. A subsequent phase is meant to build 500 units of affordable rental housing next to the armory. The project is anticipated to add $2.9 billion to New York City’s economy, and create 3,600 jobs, especially from the local community. The New York City Council approved the plan in October 2025.

Espaillat campaigned for the Second Avenue Subway to be extended into Harlem for a number of years, and as of June 2026 the $7 billion extension was expected to be completed by 2032. He said that the extension would both bring improved transit to an underserved area, but that in addition it would create 16,000 jobs, and become "the economic engine of Harlem."

=== Guns ===
In March 2021, Espaillat and Representative Brad Schneider proposed legislation to regulate ghost guns. This was pitched as an effort to curb gun violence.

=== Immigration ===
Espaillat is an advocate for immigrant rights. The first former undocumented immigrant in Congress, Espaillat supported the American Dream and Promise Act.

He visited an immigration detention facility in Carrizo Springs, Texas, in 2021. Espaillat said that the U.S. needs to do a better job of connecting migrant children detained at the Mexico–United States border with their families.

=== Israel ===
In 2019, Espaillat supported the Israel Anti-Boycott Act, which called for criminal penalties of up to $1 million for companies that support the Boycott, Divest and Sanctions Movement against Israel. In August 2019, he condemned Israeli Prime Minister Benjamin Netanyahu's decision to deny Representatives Rashida Tlaib and Ilhan Omar entry into Israel. In 2023, he voted to provide Israel with support following the October 7 attacks.

Espaillat has called for a two-state solution, and has been critical of settlement expansion. His stance on Israel and receipt of support from the American Israel Public Affairs Committee (AIPAC) has received criticism from his opponent and some of her supporters during the 2026 United States House of Representatives elections.

=== Syria ===
In 2023, Espaillat was among 56 Democrats to vote in favor of H.Con.Res. 21 which directed President Joe Biden to remove U.S. troops from Syria within 180 days.

=== Fiscal Responsibility Act of 2023 ===
Espaillat was among the 46 Democrats who voted against final passage of the Fiscal Responsibility Act of 2023 in the House.

== Personal life ==
Espaillat lives in Inwood, Manhattan. He married Martha Madera in 1979. He has two children and is a grandfather. He is a Yankees fan.

Espaillat is a Catholic but disagrees with the Church on certain issues.

=== Heritage ===
Espaillat has publicly said that former Dominican president Ulises Francisco Espaillat was his great-grandfather. However, genealogist Edwin Espinal Hernández (from the Instituto Dominicano de Genealogía) following a research discovered that Espaillat is not descended from Dominican president Ulises F. Espaillat, who belonged to the white branch of the Espaillats, but rather from Dominican military hero Pedro Ignacio Espaillat (his second-great-grandfather), who belonged to the less-known black branch of the Espaillats, who were descended from the former slaves of Francisco Espaillat (the grandfather of the Dominican president).

He is – via his mother – the great-grandson of former Dominican Senate President Mario Fermín Cabral y Báez through an illegitimate daughter, which makes him a descendant of 19th-century Dominican President Buenaventura Báez. Espaillat is related via his father to several historical Dominican military officers and politicians, including Dominican presidents Antonio Guzmán and Danilo Medina.

== Electoral history ==
=== New York City Council ===
1991 New York City Council District 10 election
Primary election
Party	Candidate	Votes	%
Democratic	Guillermo Linares	1,843	30.06
Democratic	María A. Luna	1,585	25.85
Democratic	Adriano Espaillat	1,550	25.28
Democratic	Harry C. Fotopoulos	860	14.03
Democratic	Raynard Edwards	294	4.80
Total votes		6,132	100.00
General election
Democratic	Guillermo Linares	4,901	84.79
Conservative	Apolinar Trinidad	460	7.96
Liberal	Adriano Espaillat	419	7.25
Total votes		5,780	100.00
Democratic hold			

=== New York State Assembly ===
1996 New York State Assembly District 72 election
Primary election
Party	Candidate	Votes	%
Democratic	Adriano Espaillat	3,604	52.95
Democratic	John Brian Murtaugh (incumbent)	3,203	47.05
Total votes		6,807	100.00
General election
Democratic	Adriano Espaillat	15,098	81.01
Liberal	John Brian Murtaugh (incumbent)	2,216	11.89
Republican	Hector Ramirez	1,174	6.30
Independence	Theo Maltas	150	0.81
Total votes		18,638	100.00
Democratic hold			

1998 New York State Assembly District 72 election
Primary election
Party	Candidate	Votes	%
Democratic	Adriano Espaillat (incumbent)	4,323	64.66
Democratic	Isabel Evangelista	2,363	35.34
Total votes		6,686	100.00
General election
Democratic	Adriano Espaillat (incumbent)	12,387	92.16
Republican	Faisal M. Sipra	793	5.90
Independence	Elizabeth Elliotte	261	1.94
Total votes		13,441	100.00
Democratic hold			

2000 New York State Assembly District 72 election
Primary election
Party	Candidate	Votes	%
Democratic	Adriano Espaillat (incumbent)	20,724	92.05
Republican	Nilda Luz Rexach	1,610	7.15
Conservative	David J. Brache	179	0.80
Total votes		22,513	100.00
Democratic hold			

2002 New York State Assembly District 72 election
Primary election
Party	Candidate	Votes	%
Democratic	Adriano Espaillat (incumbent)	5,652	79.85
Democratic	Rubén Dario Vargas	1,426	20.15
Total votes		7,078	100.00
General election
Democratic	Adriano Espaillat (incumbent)	8,820	85.03
Republican	Nilda Luz Rexach	1,320	12.73
Independence	Jose Reyes	233	2.25
Total votes		10,373	100.00
Democratic hold			

2004 New York State Assembly District 72 election
Primary election
Party	Candidate	Votes	%
Democratic	Adriano Espaillat (incumbent)	22,230	91.85
Republican	Martin Chicon	1,973	8.15
Total votes		24,203	100.00
Democratic hold			

2006 New York State Assembly District 72 election
Primary election
Party	Candidate	Votes	%
Democratic	Adriano Espaillat (incumbent)	3,975	68.15
Democratic	Francesca Castellanos	1,156	19.82
Democratic	Miguel Estrella	702	12.04
Total votes		5,833	100.00
General election
Democratic	Adriano Espaillat (incumbent)	14,176	90.02
Republican	Martin Chicon	1,109	7.04
Coalition	Francesca Castellanos	463	2.94
Total votes		15,748	100.00
Democratic hold			

2008 New York State Assembly District 72 election
Primary election
Party	Candidate	Votes	%
Democratic	Adriano Espaillat (incumbent)	4,542	54.06
Democratic	Miguel Martinez	3,860	45.94
Total votes		8,402	100.00
General election
Democratic	Adriano Espaillat (incumbent)	26,712	94.15
Republican	Bill Buran	1,661	5.85
Total votes		28,373	100.00
Democratic hold			

=== New York State Senate ===
2010 New York State Senate District 31 election
Primary election
Party	Candidate	Votes	%
Democratic	Adriano Espaillat	13,499	52.57
Democratic	Mark Levine	9,696	37.76
Democratic	Anna R. Lewis	1,942	7.56
Democratic	Miosotis Munoz	541	2.11
Total votes		25,678	100.00
General election
Democratic	Adriano Espaillat	50,007	83.88
Republican	Stylo A. Sapaskis	6,388	10.72
Green	Ann J. Roos	2,158	3.62
Conservative	Raphael M. Klapper	964	1.62
Independent	Mark Levine (write-in)	59	0.10
Write-in		44	0.07
Total votes		59,620	100.00
Democratic hold			

2012 New York State Senate District 31 election
Primary election
Party	Candidate	Votes	%
Democratic	Adriano Espaillat (incumbent)	11,138	61.29
Democratic	Guillermo Linares	6,927	38.12
Write-in		107	0.59
Total votes		18,172	100.00
General election
Democratic	Adriano Espaillat (incumbent)	84,944	91.11
Republican	Martin Chicon	8,184	8.78
Write-in		106	0.11
Total votes		93,234	100.00
Democratic hold			

2014 New York State Senate District 31 election
Primary election
Party	Candidate	Votes	%
Democratic	Adriano Espaillat (incumbent)	10,439	49.89
Democratic	Robert Jackson	9,019	43.10
Democratic	Luis M. Tejada	1,466	7.01
Total votes		20,924	100.00
General election
Democratic	Adriano Espaillat (incumbent)	37,089	99.19
Write-in		301	0.81
Total votes		37,390	100.00
Democratic hold			

=== U.S. House of Representatives ===
2012 New York's 13th congressional district election
Primary election
Party	Candidate	Votes	%
Democratic	Charles Rangel (incumbent)	19,187	44.45
Democratic	Adriano Espaillat	18,101	41.93
Democratic	Clyde Edward Williams Jr.	4,266	9.88
Democratic	Joyce S. Johnson	1,018	2.36
Democratic	Craig Schley	598	1.39
Total votes		43,170	100.00

2014 New York's 13th congressional district election
Primary election
Party	Candidate	Votes	%
Democratic	Charles Rangel (incumbent)	23,799	47.76
Democratic	Adriano Espaillat	21,477	43.10
Democratic	Michael A. Walrond Jr.	3,954	7.94
Democratic	Yolanda Garcia	597	1.20
Total votes		49,827	100.00

2016 New York's 13th congressional district election
Primary election
Party	Candidate	Votes	%
Democratic	Adriano Espaillat	16,377	35.87
Democratic	Keith L. T. Wright	15,528	34.01
Democratic	Clyde Edward Williams Jr.	5,003	10.96
Democratic	Adam Clayton Powell IV	2,986	6.54
Democratic	Guillermo Linares	2,504	5.49
Democratic	Suzan Johnson Cook	2,341	5.13
Democratic	Michael Gallagher	435	0.95
Democratic	Sam Sloan	227	0.50
Democratic	Yohanny Caceres	116	0.25
Write-in		138	0.30
Total votes		45,655	100.00
General election
Democratic	Adriano Espaillat	207,194	88.64
Republican	Robert A. Evans Jr.	13,129	5.62
Independence	Robert A. Evans Jr.	2,960	1.27
Total	Robert A. Evans Jr.	16,089	6.88
Green	Daniel Vila Rivera	8,248	3.53
Independent	Scott L. Fenstermaker	1,877	0.80
Write-in		329	0.14
Total votes		233,737	100.00
Democratic hold			

2018 New York's 13th congressional district election
Party	Candidate	Votes	%
Democratic	Adriano Espaillat	171,341	89.85
Working Families	Adriano Espaillat	8,694	4.56
Total	Adriano Espaillat (incumbent)	180,035	94.41
Republican	Jineea Butler	9,535	5.00
Reform	Jineea Butler	733	0.38
Total	Jineea Butler	10,268	5.38
Write-in		385	0.20
Total votes		190,688	100.00
Democratic hold			

2020 New York's 13th congressional district election
Primary election
Party	Candidate	Votes	%
Democratic	Adriano Espaillat (incumbent)	46,066	58.94
Democratic	James Felton Keith	19,799	25.33
Democratic	Ramon Rodriguez	11,859	15.17
Write-in		434	0.56
Total votes		78,158	100.00
General election
Democratic	Adriano Espaillat	202,916	79.46
Working Families	Adriano Espaillat	28,925	11.33
Total	Adriano Espaillat (incumbent)	231,841	90.79
Republican	Lovelynn "Love" Gwinn	19,829	7.77
Conservative	Christopher Morris-Perry	3,295	1.29
Write-in		405	0.16
Total votes		255,370	100.00
Democratic hold			

2022 New York's 13th congressional district election
Party	Candidate	Votes	%
Democratic	Adriano Espaillat (incumbent)	116,589	98.93
Write-in		1,257	1.07
Total votes		117,846	100.00
Democratic hold			

2024 New York's 13th congressional district election
Party	Candidate	Votes	%
Democratic	Adriano Espaillat (incumbent)	181,800	83.02
Republican	Ruben Vargas	32,071	14.65
Conservative	Ruben Vargas	3,751	1.71
Total	Ruben Vargas	35,822	16.36
Write-in		1,351	0.62
Total votes		218,973	100.00
Democratic hold			

2026 New York's 13th congressional district election Democratic primary
Party	Candidate	Votes	%
Democratic	Darializa Avila Chevalier	32,790	49.4
Democratic	Adriano Espaillat (incumbent)	30,464	45.9
Democratic	Oscar Romero	2,340	3.5
Democratic	Theo Chino-Tavarez	532	0.8
Democratic	Write-in	253	0.4
Total votes		66,379	100.0

== See also ==
- List of Hispanic and Latino Americans in the United States Congress
- List of African-American United States representatives
- List of Afro-Latinos

== Notes ==
U.S. House of Representatives
Preceded by Charles Rangel	Member of the U.S. House of Representatives from New York's 17th congressional district 2017–present	Incumbent
Preceded by Nanette Barragán	Chair of the Congressional Hispanic Caucus; 2025–present	Incumbent
U.S. order of precedence (ceremonial)
Preceded by Neal Dunn	United States representatives by seniority 163rd	Succeeded by Brian Fitzpatrick
