= June M. Eisland =

American politician (1939–2025)

Member of the New York City Council from the 11th district
- In office January 1, 1992 – December 31, 2001
- Preceded by: Rafael Castaneira Colon
- Succeeded by: Oliver Koppell

Member of the New York City Council from the 10th district
- In office February 18, 1979 – December 31, 1991
- Preceded by: Stanley Simon
- Succeeded by: Guillermo Linares

Personal details
- Born: June 25, 1939
- Died: June 12, 2025 (aged 85)
- Party: Democratic

June Margolin Eisland (June 25, 1939 – June 12, 2025) was an American politician who represented the 11th district of the New York City Council from 1979 to 2001.

A representative for Riverdale, Bronx for 60 years, Eisland died on June 12, 2025, at the age of 85. She was Jewish.
