= New York's 72nd State Assembly district =

American legislative district

Assemblymember
Manny De Los Santos; D–Fort George

New York's 72nd State Assembly district is one of the 150 districts in the New York State Assembly. It has been represented by Manny De Los Santos since 2022.

== Geography ==
=== 2020s ===
District 72 is in Manhattan. The district includes most of Marble Hill, and portions of Washington Heights, Inwood, Hudson Heights and Fort George.

The district is overlapped entirely by New York's 13th congressional district, as well as overlapped by New York's 31st State Senate district and New York City's 10th City Council district.

=== 2010s ===
District 72 is in Manhattan. The district was centered around Inwood, with portions of Washington Heights, Hudson Heights and Fort George.

== Recent election results ==
=== 2026 ===
2026 New York State Assembly election, District 72
Primary election
Party	Candidate	Votes	%
Democratic	Manny De Los Santos (incumbent)	9,176	75.6
Democratic	Francesca Castellanos	2,882	23.7
Write-in		83	0.7
Total votes		12,141	100.0
General election
Democratic	Manny De Los Santos		
Working Families	Manny De Los Santos		
Total	Manny De Los Santos (incumbent)		
Write-in			
Total votes			100.0

=== 2024 ===
2024 New York State Assembly election, District 72
Primary election
Party	Candidate	Votes	%
Democratic	Manny De Los Santos (incumbent)	2,937	79.4
Democratic	Francesca Castellanos	714	19.3
Write-in		48	1.3
Total votes		3,699	100.0
General election
Democratic	Manny De Los Santos	26,275	
Working Families	Manny De Los Santos	4,164	
Total	Manny De Los Santos (incumbent)	30,439	99.2
Write-in		254	0.8
Total votes		30,693	100.0
Democratic hold			

=== 2022 ===
2022 New York State Assembly election, District 72
Primary election
Party	Candidate	Votes	%
Democratic	Manny De Los Santos (incumbent)	4,696	67.1
Democratic	Nayma Silver-Matos	1,737	24.8
Democratic	Silvia Smith	549	7.8
Write-in		18	0.3
Total votes		7,000	100.0
General election
Democratic	Manny De Los Santos (incumbent)	17,260	98.7
Write-in		232	1.3
Total votes		17,492	100.0
Democratic hold			

=== 2022 special ===
Incumbent Carmen De La Rosa resigned on December 31, 2021 to join the New York City Council, triggering a special election. In special elections for state legislative offices, primaries are usually not held - county committee members for each party select nominees.

2022 New York State Assembly special election, District 72
Party	Candidate	Votes	%
Democratic	Manny De Los Santos	1,563	62.2
Uptown Rises	Nayma Silver-Matos	754	30.0
Republican	Edwin De La Cruz	187	7.4
Write-in		9	0.4
Total votes		2,513	100.0
Democratic hold			

=== 2020 ===
2020 New York State Assembly election, District 72
Party	Candidate	Votes	%
Democratic	Carmen De La Rosa (incumbent)	39,405	99.4
Write-in		231	0.6
Total votes		39,636	100.0
Democratic hold			

=== 2018 ===
2018 New York State Assembly election, District 72
Primary election
Party	Candidate	Votes	%
Democratic	Carmen De La Rosa (incumbent)	12,838	80.7
Democratic	Yomaris Smith	2,150	13.5
Democratic	Sosa Jimenez	845	5.3
Write-in		75	0.5
Total votes		15,908	100.0
General election
Democratic	Carmen De La Rosa	29,346	
Working Families	Carmen De La Rosa	1,971	
Total	Carmen De La Rosa (incumbent)	31,317	94.3
Republican	Ronny Goodman	1,841	5.5
Write-in		63	0.2
Total votes		33,221	100.0
Democratic hold			

=== 2016 ===
2016 New York State Assembly election, District 72
Primary election
Party	Candidate	Votes	%
Democratic	Carmen De La Rosa	4,485	52.7
Democratic	Guillermo Linares (incumbent)	3,194	37.5
Democratic	George Fernandez	808	9.5
Write-in		24	0.3
Total votes		8,511	100.0
General election
Democratic	Carmen De La Rosa	37,032	99.5
Write-in		185	0.5
Total votes		37,217	100.0
Democratic hold			

=== 2014 ===
2014 New York State Assembly election, District 72
Primary election
Party	Candidate	Votes	%
Democratic	Guillermo Linares	3,210	44.7
Democratic	Manny De Los Santos	1,896	26.4
Democratic	Melanie Hidalgo	1,308	18.2
Democratic	Francesca Castellanos	542	7.5
Democratic	Mayobanex Villalona	202	2.8
Write-in		20	0.4
Total votes		7,178	100.0
General election
Democratic	Guillermo Linares	12,226	91.0
Republican	Ronnie Cabrera	1,149	8.6
Write-in		53	0.4
Total votes		13,428	100.0
Democratic hold			

=== 2012 ===
2012 New York State Assembly election, District 72
Primary election
Party	Candidate	Votes	%
Democratic	Gabriela Rosa	3,049	43.2
Democratic	Mayra Linares	2,425	34.4
Democratic	Melanie Hidalgo	1,077	15.3
Democratic	Ruben Vargas	470	6.6
Write-in		35	0.5
Total votes		7,056	100.0
General election
Democratic	Gabriela Rosa	28,897	93.4
Republican	Ronnie Cabrera	2,010	6.5
Write-in		30	0.1
Total votes		30,937	100.0
Democratic hold			

=== 2010 ===
2010 New York State Assembly election, District 72
Primary election
Party	Candidate	Votes	%
Democratic	Guillermo Linares	3,543	48.2
Democratic	Julissa Gomez	1,792	24.4
Democratic	Gabriela Rosa	889	12.1
Democratic	Nelson Antonio Denis	727	9.9
Democratic	Miguel Estrella	377	5.1
Write-in		19	0.3
Total votes		7,347	100.0
General election
Democratic	Guillermo Linares	13,052	
Working Families	Guillermo Linares	1,113	
Total	Guillermo Linares	14,165	91.0
Republican	Dan Russo	1,382	8.8
Write-in		30	0.2
Total votes		15,563	100.0
Democratic hold			

=== 2008 ===
2008 New York State Assembly election, District 72
Primary election
Party	Candidate	Votes	%
Democratic	Adriano Espaillat (incumbent)	4,542	54.1
Democratic	Miguel Martinez	3,860	45.9
Write-in		0	0.0
Total votes		8,402	100.0
General election
Democratic	Adriano Espaillat	25,955	
Working Families	Adriano Espaillat	757	
Total	Adriano Espaillat (incumbent)	26,712	94.1
Republican	William Buran	1,661	5.9
Write-in		0	0.0
Total votes		28,373	100.0
Democratic hold			
