= Guillermo Linares =

American politician (born 1951)

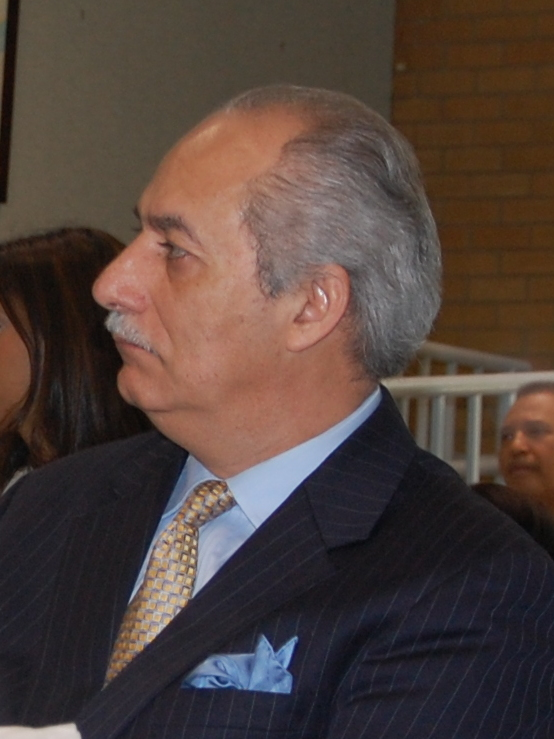
- Linares in 2010

Member of the New York State Assembly from the 72nd district
- In office January 3, 2015 – December 31, 2016
- Preceded by: Gabriela Rosa
- Succeeded by: Carmen De La Rosa
- In office January 3, 2011 – December 31, 2012
- Preceded by: Adriano Espaillat
- Succeeded by: Gabriela Rosa

Commissioner of the Mayor's Office of Immigrant Affairs
- In office 2004–2009

Member of the New York City Council from the 10th district
- In office January 1, 1992 – December 31, 2001
- Preceded by: June M. Eisland
- Succeeded by: Miguel Martinez

Personal details
- Born: August 30, 1951 (age 75) Cabrera, Dominican Republic
- Party: Democratic
- Other political affiliations: Democratic Socialist Federation; People's Party; Citizens' Party; New Party; Working Families
- Spouse: Evelyn
- Children: two
- Education: Columbia University, Ed.D
- Profession: politician
- Website: Official website

Guillermo Linares (born August 30, 1951) is a Democratic politician. He served as a member of the New York State Assembly, representing the 72nd Assembly District in Manhattan from 2015 to 2016, and previously from 2011 to 2012.

He also ran without success in 2012 for the New York State Senate (losing to Adriano Espaillat), in 2016 for the U.S. Congress (again losing to Adriano Espaillat), and later in 2016 to be reelected to his New York State Assembly seat (losing to Carmen De La Rosa), in each case during the Democratic primaries. He is a former New York City Council Member and a former New York City Commissioner of Immigrant Affairs.

== Early life ==
Guillermo Linares was born on August 30, 1951, in the town of Cabrera in the Dominican Republic; he was the oldest of nine children. He says he shares the experiences and aspirations of immigrant New Yorkers, having left his native Dominican Republic in 1966 and joining his parents who gained residency through the 1965 immigration reform, he arrived in the East Tremont section of the Bronx, at 14 years old. He began to learn the English language as he finished high school, gaining a General Equivalency Diploma from Theodore Roosevelt High School. Although initially discouraged from going to college by his high school guidance counselor, Linares was encouraged by his parents, who said that as the eldest child, he had a responsibility to obtain a college degree. Taking on jobs, such as taxi driving, in order to pay for his college education, he became an American citizen during his sophomore year of college. He is married to Evelyn Linares, a public school principal. They have two children, Mayra and Guillermo, as well as a granddaughter, Ava and grandson, Dylan.

== Public office ==
=== 1991-2009 ===
In 1991, Linares became the first Dominican American elected to public office in New York City and tied for first in the United States with Kay Palacios. He served from 1992 to 2001 in the New York City Council. Linares also served as a member of the President's Advisory Commission on Educational Excellence for Hispanic Americans, after President Bill Clinton appointed him in 1999 as a commission chair. Linares was appointed the NYC Commissioner of Immigrant Affairs in 2004.

=== 2010-16 ===
In 2010 Linares was elected New York State Assemblyman for the 72nd District, a seat that Adriano Espaillat had left after he was elected to the New York State Senate.

In 2012 Linares was defeated when he challenged Senator Espaillat in the Democratic primary for New York's 31st State Senate district, and Linares lost 62%-38%. Linares was replaced in the New York State Assembly by Gabriela Rosa.

In 2014, after NY State Assembly Member Gabriela Rosa pleaded guilty to marriage fraud (lying about a sham marriage in order to become a U.S. citizen) and resigned, Linares ran for his old seat in the 2014 New York State Assembly election. He won a four-way Democratic primary with 45% of the vote, and went on to win the general election with 92% of the vote.

In 2016 Linares was defeated when he ran against Adriano Espaillat and others in the 2016 New York's 13th United States House of Representatives Democratic primary election. Espaillat defeated him again and won, as Linares came in 5th with 5% of the vote.

Linares was then defeated as well in his bid for re-election to his seat in the New York State Assembly in 2016 by Carmen De La Rosa, 53% to 38% in the primary (and she was unopposed in the general election).

Political offices
Preceded by June Eisland	New York City Council, 10th district 1992–2001	Succeeded by Miguel Martinez
New York State Assembly
Preceded by Adriano Espaillat	New York State Assembly, 72nd District; 2011-2012	Succeeded by Gabriela Rosa
New York State Assembly
Preceded by Gabriela Rosa	New York State Assembly, 72nd District; 2015-2016	Succeeded by Carmen De La Rosa
