= Hispanics and Latinos in New York City =

According to the U.S. Census Bureau, there were about 2.5 million (2,490,350) Hispanics living in New York City in 2020.

Latino immigrants are concentrated in Queens and the Bronx. Dominicans are the largest foreign Latino born group in New York City, followed by Mexicans.

People from Spain have been present in the city since early European colonization.

== Hispanic or Latino by national origin ==
Ancestry by origin	Number	%
(Puerto Rico) Puerto Ricans	574,053	
(Dominican Republic) Dominicans	722,274	
(Mexico) Mexicans	363,138	
(Cuba) Cubans	34,269	

== See also ==
- Dominicans in New York City
- Puerto Ricans in New York City
- Mexicans in New York City
