= Hispanics and Latinos in New York =

Hispanic and Latino New Yorkers are residents of the state of New York who, according to the US census boureau are of Hispanic or Latino ancestry. As of 2013, Hispanics and Latinos of any race were 18.4% of the state's population. The Hispanic and Latino population is especially large in New York City, where the 2.49 million Hispanics (as defined by the U.S. Census) make up 28.3% of the city's population, the second-largest population group second only to non-Hispanic whites at 30.9.%.

== History ==
The first Hispanic presence in New York may have been that of the Portuguese explorer's troops Estêvão Gomes, who served the Castilian Crown. In 1524 Gomes may have entered New York Harbor and seen the Hudson River. The first Hispanic to emigrate to the modern-day New York was the Dominican Juan Rodriguez. He was a member of the crew of the Dutch ship Jonge Tobias, which reached New York City in 1613, and he lived there for a while, being the first non-Native American to reside in the region. Another early settler with Hispanic and Moorish, as well as Dutch, roots was Anthony Janszoon van Salee.

Puerto Rican migration to New York began in the 19th century and became the largest Hispanic group to migrate to the state. This migration increased in 1917 with the enactment of the Jones-Shafroth Act, which granted U.S. citizenship to all Puerto Ricans, and especially in the 1940s and 1950s.

== Hispanic or Latino by national origin ==
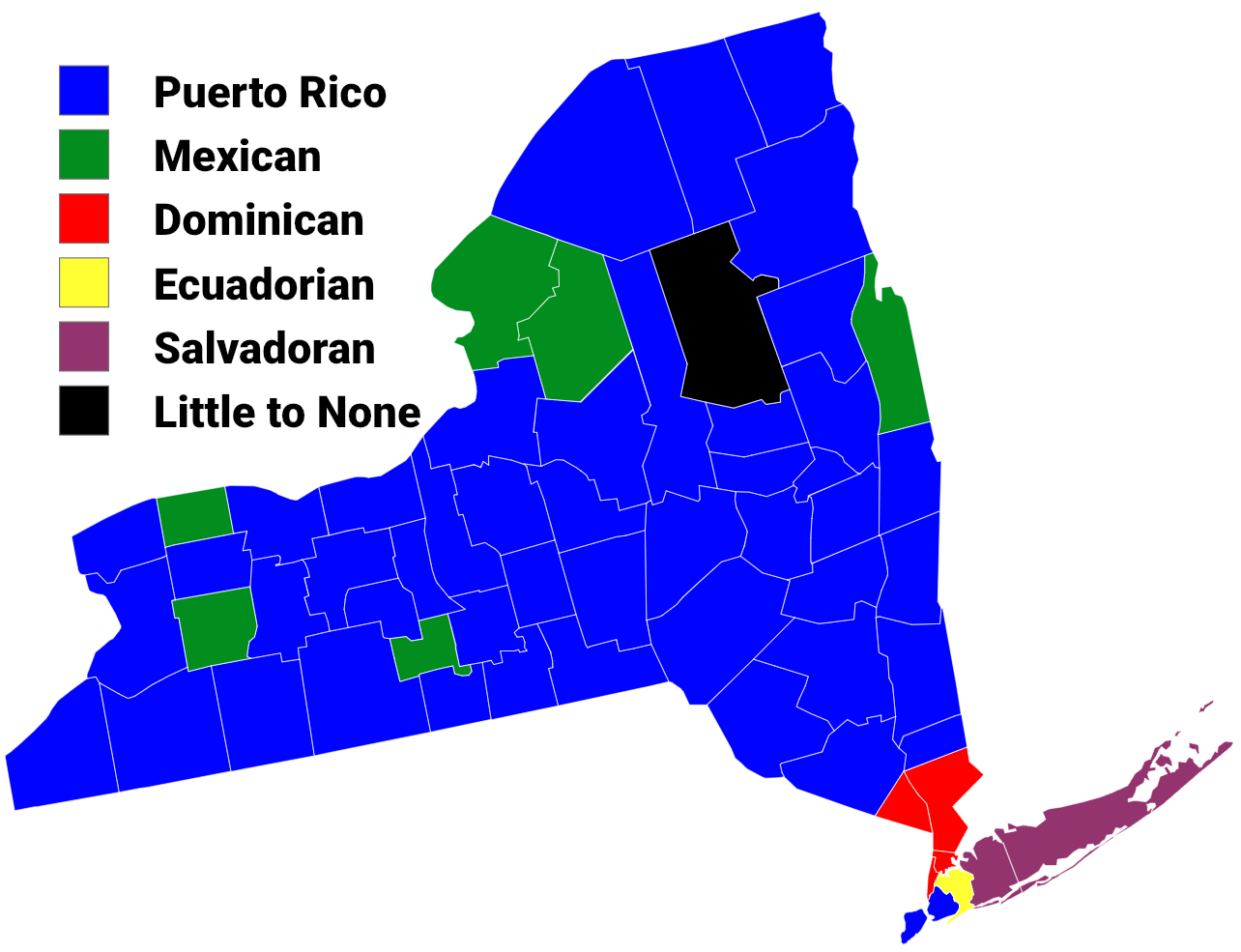
Largest Hispanic ancestry in New York (state) by country, per the 2020 census

| Ancestry by origin | Number | % |
|---|---|---|
| (Puerto Rico) Puerto Ricans | 1,078,084 | |
| (Dominican Republic) Dominicans | 851,630 | |
| (Mexico) Mexicans | 464,480 | |
| (Ecuador) Ecuadorians | 271,016 | |
| (El Salvador) Salvadorans | 178,792 | |
| (Colombia) Colombians | 164,584 | |

== By region ==
The New York City borough of the Bronx is majority Hispanic. The first Hispanic Borough President of the Bronx was Herman Badillo in the 1960s.

The city of Haverstraw is the most-Hispanic or Latino city in New York, with 67% of the population identifying as Hispanic or Latino.

== See also ==
- Nuyorican
- Dominicans in New York City
