= Mexicans in New York City =

Ethnic group

Mexican Americans, as of 2004, were New York's fastest growing ethnic group, with 186,000 immigrants as of 2013; they were also the third largest Hispanic group in New York City, after Puerto Ricans and Dominicans. Close to 80% of New York Mexicans were born outside the United States, and more than 60% of Mexican New Yorkers reside in Brooklyn and Queens.

In Brooklyn, Dyker Heights, Sunset Park, Bensonhurst, Midwood, Flatbush, Kensington and Clinton Hill have the highest concentration of Mexicans, and Bay Ridge, Prospect Heights, Fort Greene, Williamsburg, Crown Heights, Brownsville, Park Slope, Canarsie, Flatlands, Windsor Terrace, Gravesend, Bushwick, Red Hook, Sheepshead Bay and Brighton Beach also have significant Mexican populations. In Queens, Elmhurst, East Elmhurst, and Jackson Heights have the largest Mexican populations, but Corona and Kew Gardens also have sizable communities. Spanish Harlem in Manhattan, around 116th Street and Second Avenue, has a large community of Mexicans, which is still small compared to the area's predominant Puerto Rican population; Staten Island has a large Mexican community in the Port Richmond, West Brighton, and Tompkinsville areas.

Compared to Mexican immigrants in other states and cities, Mexicans in New York are primarily of indigenous descent, with almost 20% speaking indigenous languages. New York holds 61% of indigenous-speaking immigrants from Mexico.

Mexican community organizations have established mentorship and after-school initiatives aimed at sharing information and providing a supportive environment for youth to pursue their educational goals. Asociación Tepeyac, recognized as the largest Mexican nonprofit organization in New York City, has prioritized the promotion of education. Additional organizations contributing to this effort include the Mexican American Students Alliance, the Mexican Educational Foundation of New York, and the Mixteca Organization. The chancellor of the City University of New York (CUNY) has initiated a Committee on Mexicans and Education in New York, engaging in coordinated outreach efforts with the Mexican community across all five boroughs. Furthermore, CUNY is backing various programs, including Baruch College's Emerging Leaders initiative, which equips Mexican community leaders with the skills necessary to manage nonprofit organizations.

== History of Puebla York ==
Puebla York is a nickname given to the Poblano community in New York City to describe the relationship and transnational network created between Puebla, Mexico and New York City over the second half of the 20th century.

The 80s of Mexico were marked as the “lost decades” because of the stagnant economy of the nation, which was expected to last until the late 90s. Puebla was one of the hardest hit states, experiencing a net contraction, meaning GDP was slowing down and unemployment was rising. Mexicans’ loss of faith in the economy of their nation drove them to depend on American employers and it displayed Mexicans as plentiful and dependable workers to the United States. Furthermore, the Immigration and Control Act of 1986’s amnesty provision became a major beacon of hope for Poblanos already in the United States and those in Mexico thinking of migrating.

Reasons for migration included political violence, better wages, and modern conveniences.

The number of Mexican migrants who were settling in New York City had increased, regardless of legal status. The amnesty program of the 1986 act and the family immigration system of the 1990’s act gave those Poblanos who wanted to migrate the opportunity to do so, but also gave them the chance to be naturalized citizens.

According to the CUNY Mexican Studies Institute, a little over 180,000 Mexicans lived in the five boroughs in 2000 jumping to over 324,000 in 2021. And in Staten Island that growth is staggering. Almost 20,000 Mexicans call this borough home, a 183% jump from 20 years ago.

== See also ==
- Hispanics and Latinos in New York City
