= Ydanis Rodríguez =

American politician (born 1965)

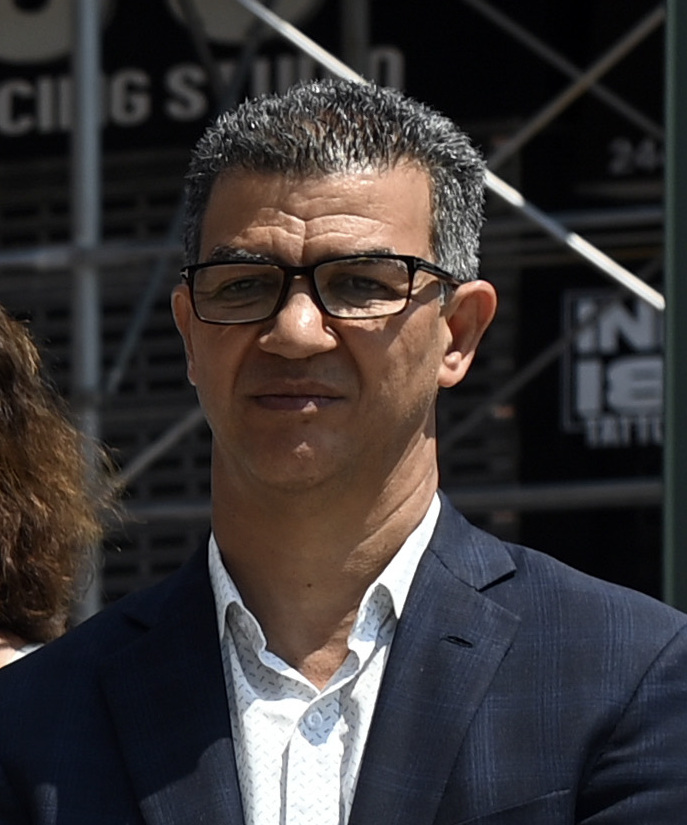

Commissioner of the New York City Department of Transportation
- In office January 1, 2022 – December 31, 2025
- Mayor: Eric Adams
- Preceded by: Henry Gutman
- Succeeded by: Mike Flynn

Member of the New York City Council from the 10th district
- In office January 1, 2010 – December 31, 2021
- Preceded by: Miguel Martinez
- Succeeded by: Carmen De La Rosa

Personal details
- Born: June 18, 1965 (age 61) Licey al Medio, Santiago de los Caballeros, Santiago, Cibao, Dominican Republic
- Party: Democratic
- Other political affiliations: Citizens' Party; Freedom Road Socialist Organization; New Party; Working Families; Solidarity Party
- Children: 2
- Education: City College of New York
- Website: Campaign website Official website

Ydanis Rodríguez (born June 18, 1965) is the former Commissioner of the New York City Department of Transportation and a politician who formerly represented the 10th district on the New York City Council. A Democrat who was first elected to the City Council in 2009, Rodríguez was re-elected in 2013 and 2017. He also served as Chair of the Transportation Committee. Rodríguez is known for his November 2011 arrest at an Occupy Wall Street rally, and was profiled for the act in Time's 2011 Person of the Year issue.

Rodríguez ran for New York City Public Advocate in 2019 and ran for United States House of Representatives for New York's 15th congressional district in 2020; he did not prevail in either race.

== Early life ==
Rodríguez was born in the Dominican Republic and moved from his hometown of Licey al Medio to New York City when he was 18 years old. While working as a taxi driver, Rodriguez earned his bachelor's degree in political science at the City College of New York.

== Political career ==
=== New York City Council ===
Following unsuccessful City Council bids in 2001 and 2003, Rodríguez ran again in 2009. He won the Democratic primary election in the 10th district by over 60 percent against seven other candidates and prevailed in the general election. Rodríguez was re-elected in 2013 and 2017. The 10th district includes Washington Heights, Inwood, and Marble Hill in Manhattan.

In January 2010, Rodriguez was appointed as chair of the Higher Education Committee. As Chair, Rodríguez called for more diversity in the faculty of CUNY, more childcare programs for student-parents, and successfully fought to keep CUNY's budget intact during the economic recession. As Chair, Rodriguez focused on working to raise the number of New York City high school graduates who are college-ready. He has also served as Chair of the Council Transportation Committee.

In January 2011, Rodríguez was arrested for civil disobedience at a demonstration against the Arizona law requiring police officers to arrest persons without documentation. On November 15, 2011, Rodriguez was arrested for obstructing government administration and disorderly conduct. He was seen bleeding from the head as he was placed in a police car. Rodriguez remained in Zuccotti Park along with about 200 other Occupy Wall Street protestors who refused to leave after Brookfield Properties asked the Bloomberg administration to clear the park for cleaning. Rodriguez was featured in Time Magazine's Person of the Year issue in 2011, included for his role in the Occupy Wall Street movement.

Rodríguez worked with the tenants of 552 Academy St. in Manhattan and local community groups to have the building turned over from a negligent landlord to CLOTH, a local community organization. He helped secure funding for a $21.1 million renovation for the building. The building has one of the few green roofs in Inwood.

In 2013, Rodríguez became the first New York City Council Member to ever take paternity leave following the birth of his daughter. Rodríguez took two weeks' leave. Since then, he has been vocal about the need for paid paternity and maternity leave in New York City and nationwide, citing the vast number of countries that have paid family leave.

In 2014 the hiring by Department of Design and Construction (DDC) Commissioner Feniosky Pena-Mora of Rodríguez's wife Christina Melendez as a special assistant to the agency with a $150,000-a-year salary sparked controversy Employees at DDC twice complained in writing to Mayor Bill de Blasio that the commissioner was engaging in patronage and hiring "cronies". The commissioner and Rodriguez had a prior relationship. In 2012, when the commissioner was threatened with removal as Dean at Columbia University's engineering school, Rodriguez led a campaign to keep the commissioner in his job. Rodríguez's wife did not have a background in either engineering or architecture (areas associated with the DDC), but her new position with paid her $48,000 more than her previous role.

In February 2016, residents of his district expressed unhappiness with Rodriguez's assertion that he needed to be paid at least $175,000 to support his family, rather than the then-current base salary of $112,500, which was already being raised 32% to $148,500. The median household income was $39,500 in Rodriguez's district at the time.

In 2016, Rodríguez sponsored a bill that was signed into law that eliminated the requirement that New York City taxi drivers take an English proficiency exam.

In 2017, he and several other politicians expressed outrage at the MTA's practices and lack of regard for their ridership, urging the agency to offer better service.

=== 2019 New York Public Advocate campaign ===
Rodríguez was one of 18 candidates who ran to replace Letitia James as New York City Public Advocate upon her election to Attorney General of New York. As the election was officially nonpartisan, Rodríguez ran on the "Unite Immigrants" party line. Rodríguez came in fifth with 24,266 votes.

=== 2020 U.S. House of Representatives campaign ===
In 2019, Rodríguez declared his candidacy for the United States House of Representatives in New York's 15th congressional district following the retirement of 30-year incumbent José E. Serrano. He finished in fifth place out of 12 candidates in the June 23, 2020, Democratic Party primary.

=== New York City Department of Transportation ===
On December 20, 2021, New York City Mayor Eric Adams announced Rodríguez as the Commissioner of the New York City Department of Transportation. He oversaw a department of 5,060 employees with an annual budget of around $1 billion. His term ended on December 31, 2025.

== Election History ==
New York City Council: District 10
| Election | Candidate | Party | Votes | Pct | Candidate | Party | Votes | Pct | Candidate | Party | Votes | Pct | Candidate | Party | Votes | Pct |
|---|---|---|---|---|---|---|---|---|---|---|---|---|---|---|---|---|
| 2009 Primary | Rodríguez | Dem | 5,321 | 60.34% | Richard Realmuto | Dem | 1,325 | 15.03% | Manuel Velazquez | Dem | 876 | 9.93% | Others (4) | Dem | 1,333 | 12.85% |
| 2009 General | Rodríguez | Dem | 12,121 | 95.05% | Ruben Vargas | Ind | 630 | 4.94% | | | | | | | | |
| 2013 Primary | Rodríguez | Dem | 10,157 | 70.82% | Cheryl Pahaham | Dem | 3,219 | 22.44% | F. Castellanos | Dem | 967 | 6.74% | | | | |
| 2013 General | Rodríguez | Dem | 18,480 | 89.64% | Ronnie Cabrera | Ind | 1,595 | 7.74% | Miquel Estrella | SC | 497 | 2.41% | | | | |
| 2017 General Election | Rodríguez | Dem | 18,855 | 90.05% | Ronny Goodman | Ind | 1,595 | 10.94% | | | | | | | | |

Political offices
| Preceded by Miguel Martinez | New York City Council, 10th district 2010–2021 | Succeeded by Carmen De La Rosa |
| Preceded by Henry Gutman | Commissioner of the New York City Department of Transportation; 2022 | Succeeded by Mike Flynn |
