= Manny De Los Santos =

American politician (born 1979)

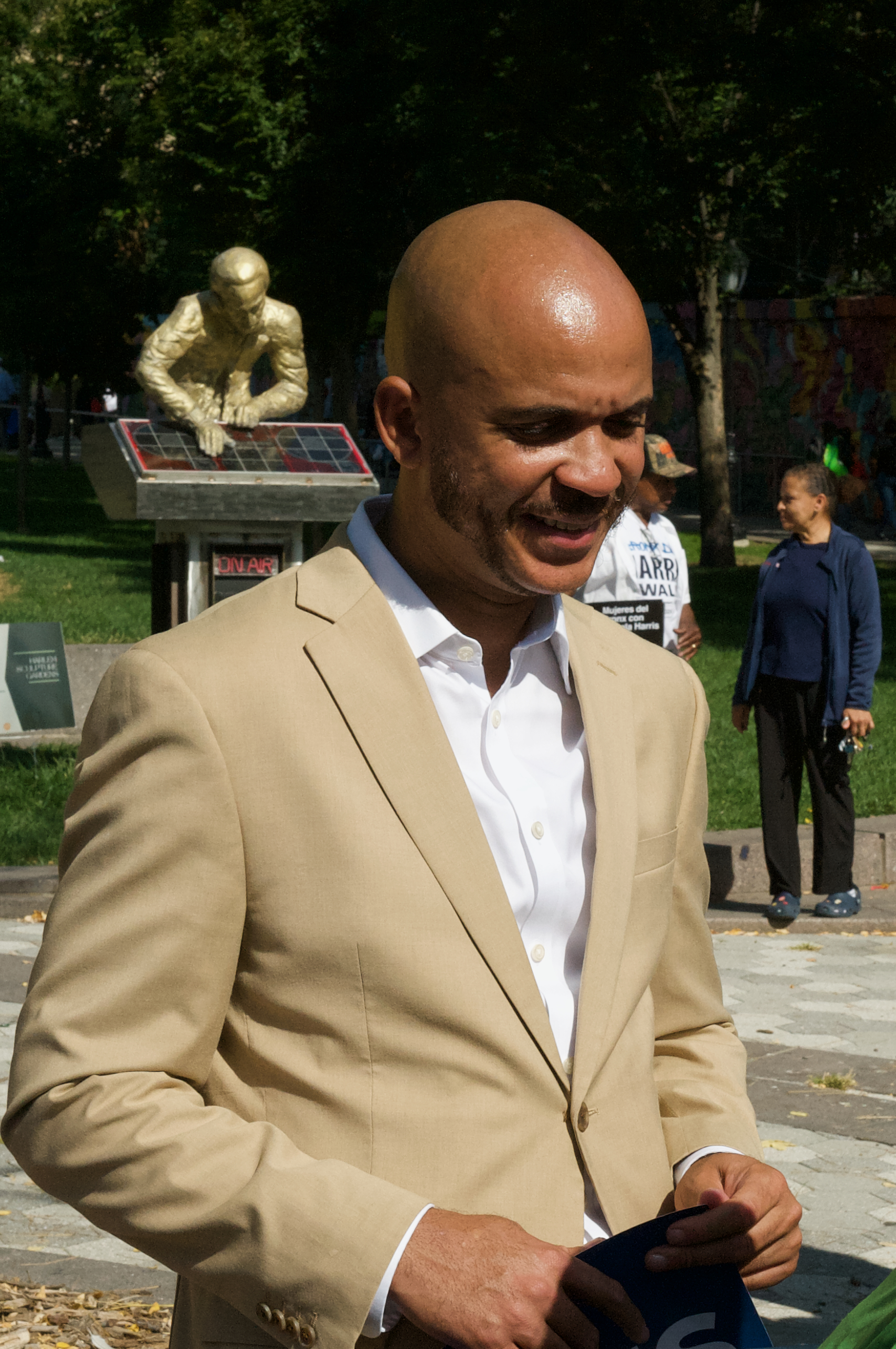
- Santos in 2024

Member of the New York State Assembly from the 72nd district
- Incumbent
- Assumed office February 17, 2022
- Preceded by: Carmen De La Rosa

Personal details
- Born: January 30, 1979 (age 47) Dominican Republic
- Party: Democratic
- Education: State University of New York, Albany (BA, MSW)
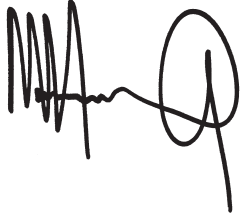
- Signature
- Website: State Assembly website

Manny K. De Los Santos (born January 30, 1979) is an American politician and social worker serving as a member of the New York State Assembly from the 72nd district. He assumed office on February 17, 2022.

== Early life and education ==
De Los Santos was born in the Dominican Republic and was raised in Washington Heights, Manhattan. He earned a Bachelor of Arts degree in psychology and a Master of Social Work from the University at Albany, SUNY.

== Career ==
De Los Santos began his career working for the Children's Aid Society as a school social worker. From 2011 to 2018, he was a social worker for Counseling in Schools. In 2018, he was the campaign manager for Congressman Adriano Espaillat's re-election campaign. He was also the assistant vice president of the Hamilton Campaign Network. From 2019 to 2022, he worked as vice president of MirRam Group for government relations. De Los Santos was elected to the New York State Assembly in a February 2022 special election.
