= Miguel Martinez (politician) =

American politician (born 1978)

Member of the New York City Council from the 10th district
- In office January 3, 2002 – July 14, 2009
- Preceded by: Guillermo Linares
- Succeeded by: Ydanis Rodríguez
- Constituency: Manhattan: parts of Washington Heights, Inwood, Marble Hill.

Personal details
- Born: 1978 (age 47–48) Dominican Republic
- Party: Democratic
- Other political affiliations: Liberal
- Education: John Jay College (1994)

Miguel Martinez (born 1978) is a Dominican-American former politician and former New York City Council member from the 10th district in Upper Manhattan in New York City, United States. He was succeeded by Ydanis Rodriguez.

Martinez resigned abruptly from his City Council seat on July 14, 2009. He pleaded guilty to three counts of conspiracy two days later. He was sentenced in Federal District Court in Manhattan to five years in prison, in addition to two years of supervised release, and ordered to pay back to the government $106,000 that he had stolen from his Council office and two nonprofit groups financed by New York City.

== Early life ==
Martinez was born in the Dominican Republic, and emigrated to the U.S. with his family as a child. He received a bachelor's degree in Criminal Justice Planning and Administration from John Jay College of Criminal Justice in New York City in 1994.

== New York City Council (2002–09) ==
Martinez represented the 10th district of the New York City Council, which includes parts of the Washington Heights and Inwood sections of upper Manhattan. He served as a Council member for six years, and chaired the Fire and Criminal Justice Services Committee.

Martinez was fined $44,780 in January 2008 by the New York City Campaign Finance Board, and ordered to repay $128,786 he had received in public matching funds for his 2001 campaign, because the Martinez campaign submitted fabricated receipts to account for spending.

That year he also ran but lost in the Democratic primary for the New York State Assembly in District 72.

=== Resignation and criminal conviction ===
Martinez resigned abruptly from his City Council seat on July 14, 2009. He was succeeded by Ydanis Rodriguez. He pleaded guilty to three counts of conspiracy two days later, honest services fraud, mail fraud and conspiracy to commit money laundering. Martinez admitted to stealing $106,000 from his Council office and two nonprofit groups financed by New York City, some of which was intended for children's art programs and low-income housing, and was ordered to pay it back to the government. Martinez admitted that beginning in 2002 he had approved fake billing invoices to his Council office and stolen $51,000, and also stole $55,000 that should have been paid to two nonprofit groups in his district, the Washington Heights Art Center and the Upper Manhattan Council Assisting Neighbors. Martinez was convicted on three corruption felonies, and on December 15, 2009, was sentenced by Judge Paul A. Crotty in Federal District Court in Manhattan to five years in prison, in addition to two years of supervised release.

In August 2014, United States Attorney for the Southern District of New York Preet Bharara announced an agreement by Martinez for him to forfeit pension benefits of his in the NYC Employee Retirement System that he was otherwise eligible to receive when he reached 57 years of age, until his forfeiture judgment is fully paid.

Government offices
Preceded by Guillermo Linares	New York City Council, 10th district 2002–2009	Succeeded by Ydanis Rodriguez
