= Carmen De La Rosa =

American politician (born 1985)

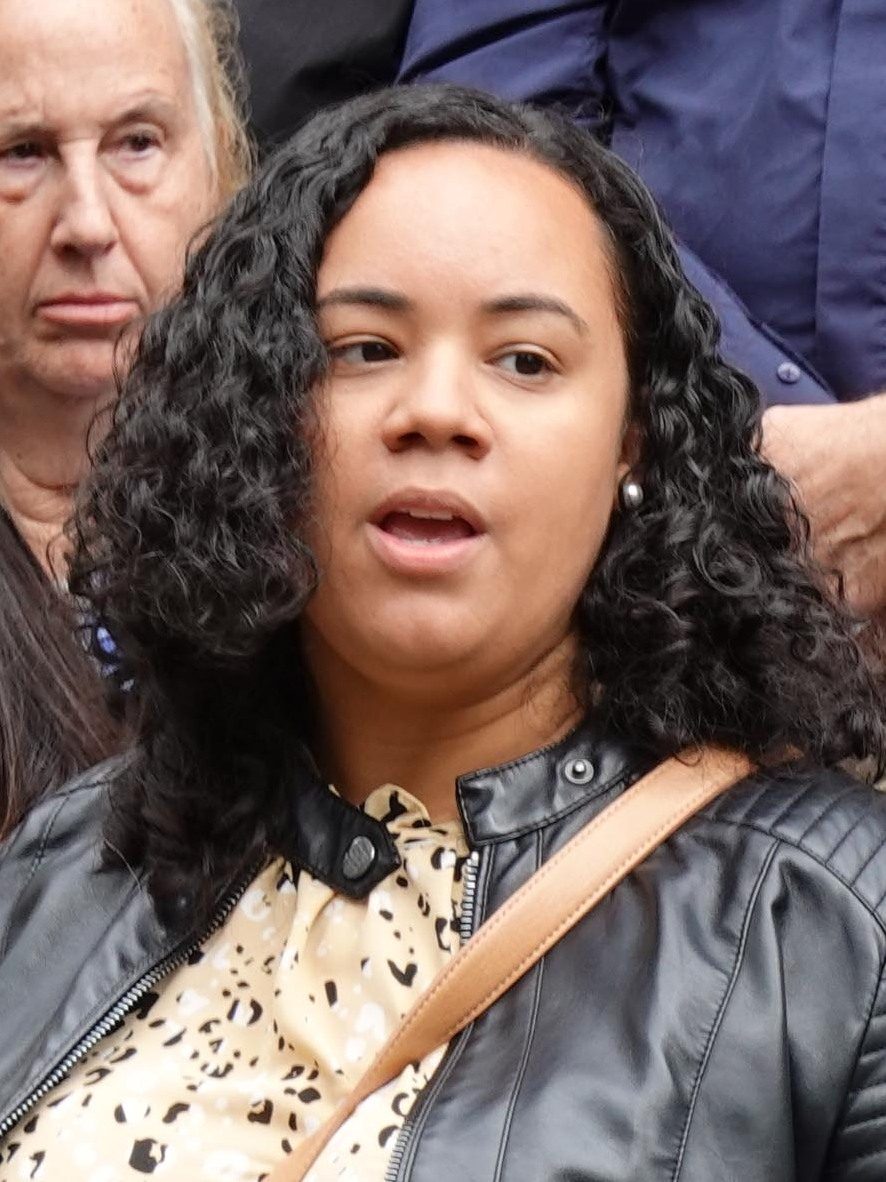

Member of the New York City Council from the 10th district
- Incumbent
- Assumed office January 1, 2022
- Preceded by: Ydanis Rodríguez

Member of the New York State Assembly from the 72nd district
- In office January 1, 2017 – December 31, 2021
- Preceded by: Guillermo Linares
- Succeeded by: Manny De Los Santos

Personal details
- Born: December 25, 1985 (age 40) Dominican Republic
- Party: Democratic
- Children: 1
- Education: Fordham University (BA)
- Website: City Council website

Carmen N. De La Rosa (born December 25, 1985) is an American politician from the state of New York. A Democrat, De La Rosa has represented District 10 on the New York City Council since January 2022. She previously represented the 72nd District in the New York State Assembly from 2017 to 2021.

== Early life, education, and family ==
De La Rosa was born in the Dominican Republic but came to New York City with her family at a very young age, where they settled in northern Manhattan. She attended Mother Cabrini High School, before receiving her bachelor's degree at Fordham University in the Bronx. She has one daughter.

== Career ==
Long interested in politics, De La Rosa was active in the Democratic Party and worked for the New York State Assembly, and later became Chief of Staff to New York City Councilmember Ydanis Rodriguez in 2014. In September 2015, she ran and was elected as a Democratic District Leader for the 72nd Assembly District.

=== New York State Assembly (2017–2021) ===
In 2016, a whirlwind of open seats in Northern Manhattan Congressional, state Senate and state Assembly districts was spurred by the retirement of long-time Congressman Charlie Rangel. With Rangel's seat open, state Senator Adriano Espaillat, one of the nation's first Dominican-born elected officials, was seen as a front runner, spurring widespread excitement and support in the Dominican community for his candidacy. Along with his own campaign, Espaillat, following his victory in the Democratic primary over six other candidates, announced his support for Marisol Alcantara to replace him in the Senate, and for De La Rosa in the 72nd Assembly district.

De La Rosa's candidacy was significant because the 72nd District was not an open seat. Long-time politician Guillermo Linares was running for re-election, despite earlier running in the congressional primary against Espaillat and others to replace Rangel. However, since in New York federal and state primaries are not held on the same day, candidates who fail to win their federal primaries can then run in the state primaries, as Linares chose to do. However, due to a long-standing feud with Espaillat, Linares was challenged by the Congressman-elect's new political machine.

On primary day, De La Rosa would easily defeat Linares 53% to 38%, with a third candidate, Democrat George Fernandez, taking 10%. She was unopposed in the general election and was sworn in on January 1, 2017.

De La Rosa was the sponsor of the New York Dream Act, which became law in 2019.

=== New York City Council (2022–present) ===
On November 2, 2021, De La Rosa was elected to represent District 10 on the New York City Council. As of January 24, 2022, she had taken her seat on the City Council. De La Rosa is the chair of the Labor Committee.

In 2023, De La Rosa held a hearing on January 9, 2023 for Intro. 874, a bill introduced at the request of Mayor Eric Adams that would allow push the retirees into predatory Medicare Advantage plans or for them to pay premiums for the first time in 60 years on their Traditional Medicare Benefits which would have been impossible for many their pensions low: Two thirds of DC37 retirees make under $35,000 a year and one third of them make under $12,000 a year in pension. Current retirees in the City of NY are no longer in unions, and their vested health benefits were earned during decades of service. Statute provides health benefits to be paid for by the City as legislated by the City Council in 1967 by then Mayor John Lindsay. This hearing lasted about 10 hours and thousands of retirees came out to testify against the shift in benefits on this cold winter day.

Councilman Charles Barron drafted a bill, Intro 1099 that was simply two sentences long requiring the City to offer a Medigap plan like retirees are currently in and stating nothing in this bill would interfere with a unions' collective bargaining - an excuse made not to help them. Retirees are no longer in unions once retired so their benefits would not impair a union bargaining - retirees cannot bargain under the law. The Speaker, Adrienne Adams, not only blocked the bill from being introduced the traditional way, she also intimidated other councilmembers from signing onto it, and prevented Councilwoman Carmen De La Rosa from calling the bill to a hearing in the Civil Service and Labor Committee, letting it die in committee. When confronted by Retirees why she was not calling their bill to a hearing as outlined in Council policy, she said she would not cross the wishes of the Speaker.

The Retirees were forced to continue grass roots fundraising to support their litigation since De La Rosa refused to help them. So far they have won ten times in court across three separate litigations with two unanimous appeals decisions. They have not lost yet, but the Mayor continues to appeal every loss.

In 2024, the retirees introduced a new bill, Intro 1096 to codify their access to Medicare and protect the benefits they earned; it preserves a floor the council set 60 years ago that can be built upon in the future. This bill is also in De La Rosa's Civil Service and Labor Committee in the City Council. The Retirees continue to educate the Council and have garnered a lot of support.

== Electoral history ==
=== 2025 ===
2025 New York City Council Democratic primary, District 10
Party	Candidate	Votes	%
Democratic	Carmen De La Rosa (incumbent)	20,437	87.1
Democratic	Francesca M. Castellanos	2,908	12.4
Write-in		128	0.5
Total votes		23,473	100.0

2025 New York City Council election, District 10
Party	Candidate	Votes	%
Democratic	Carmen De La Rosa	28,031	68.9
Working Families	Carmen De La Rosa	7,301	17.9
Total	Carmen De La Rosa (incumbent)	35,332	86.8
Republican	Louisa Flores	4,194	10.3
The Unity	Francesca M. Castellanos	1,052	2.6
Write-in		120	0.3
Total votes		40,698	100.0
Democratic hold			

=== 2023 ===
2023 New York City Council Democratic primary, District 10
Party	Candidate	Votes	%
Democratic	Carmen De La Rosa (incumbent)	5,143	84.5
Democratic	Guillermo A. Perez	781	12.8
Write-in		162	2.7
Total votes		6,086	100.0

2023 New York City Council election, District 10
Party	Candidate	Votes	%
Democratic	Carmen De La Rosa	7,161	77.0
Working Families	Carmen De La Rosa	1,814	19.5
Total	Carmen De La Rosa (incumbent)	8,975	96.5
Write-in		327	3.5
Total votes		9,302	100.0
Democratic hold			

=== 2021 ===
2021 New York City Council Democratic primary, District 10
Party	Candidate	Maximum round	Maximum votes	Share in maximum round	Maximum votes First round votes Transfer votes
Democratic	Carmen De La Rosa	4	10,318	59.8%	
Democratic	Johanna Garcia	4	6,949	40.2%	
Democratic	Angela Fernandez	3	3,997	21.7%	
Democratic	James E. Behr	2	729	3.7%	
Democratic	Francesca M. Castellanos	2	663	3.4%	
Democratic	Thomas A. Leon	2	600	3.1%	
Democratic	Josue Perez	2	590	3.0%	
Democratic	Tirso S. Pina	2	331	1.7%	
Write-In		1	60	0.3%	

2021 New York City Council election, District 10
Party	Candidate	Votes	%
Democratic	Carmen De La Rosa	17,765	85.9
Republican	Edwin De La Cruz	2,702	13.1
Write-in		203	1.0
Total votes		20,670	100.0
Democratic hold			

=== 2020 ===
2020 New York State Assembly election, District 72
Party	Candidate	Votes	%
Democratic	Carmen De La Rosa (incumbent)	39,405	99.4
Write-in		231	0.6
Total votes		39,636	100.0
Democratic hold			

=== 2018 ===
2018 New York State Assembly Democratic primary, District 72
Party	Candidate	Votes	%
Democratic	Carmen De La Rosa (incumbent)	12,838	80.7
Democratic	Yomaris M. Smith	2,150	13.5
Democratic	Sosa A. Jimenez	845	5.3
Write-in		75	0.5
Total votes		15,908	100.0

2018 New York State Assembly election, District 72
Party	Candidate	Votes	%
Democratic	Carmen De La Rosa	29,346	88.3
Working Families	Carmen De La Rosa	1,971	5.9
Total	Carmen De La Rosa (incumbent)	31,317	94.3
Republican	Ronny Goodman	1,841	5.5
Write-in		63	0.2
Total votes		33,221	100.0
Democratic hold			

=== 2016 ===
2016 New York State Assembly Democratic primary, District 72
Party	Candidate	Votes	%
Democratic	Carmen De La Rosa	4,485	52.7
Democratic	Guillermo Linares (incumbent)	3,194	37.5
Democratic	George Fernandez	808	9.5
Write-in		24	0.3
Total votes		8,511	100.0

2016 New York State Assembly election, District 72
Party	Candidate	Votes	%
Democratic	Carmen De La Rosa	37,032	99.5
Write-in		185	0.5
Total votes		37,217	100.0
Democratic hold			
