= New York City's 10th City Council district =

- Boundaries following the 2020 census

Government
  - Councilmember: Carmen De La Rosa (D—Inwood)

Population (2010)
  - Total: 136,647

Demographics
  - Hispanic: 81%
  - White: 9%
  - Black: 6%
  - Asian: 2%
  - Other: 1%

Registration
  - Democratic: 77.2%
  - Republican: 5.0%
  - No party preference: 15.4%
- Registered voters (2021) 123,268

New York City's 10th City Council district is one of 51 districts in the New York City Council. It is currently represented by Democrat Carmen De La Rosa, who took office in 2022.

== Geography ==
District 10 covers the northernmost neighborhoods of Manhattan, including Washington Heights, Inwood, and Marble Hill.

The district overlaps with Manhattan Community Board 12 and, because of Marble Hill (politically part of Manhattan but geographically part of the Bronx), Bronx Community Boards 7 and 8. It is contained entirely within New York's 13th congressional district, and also overlaps with the 30th and 31st districts of the New York State Senate and the 71st and 72nd districts of the New York State Assembly.

At over 80 percent Hispanic, the district has by far the highest Hispanic population of any City Council district in Manhattan. Dominican Americans are particularly concentrated in the district; its four most recent councilmembers have all been Dominican.

== Recent election results ==
=== 2025 ===
2025 New York City Council election, District 10
Primary election
Party	Candidate	Votes	%
Democratic	Carmen De La Rosa (incumbent)	20,437	87.1
Democratic	Francesca Castellanos	2,908	12.4
Write-in		128	0.5
Total votes		23,473	100.0
General election
Democratic	Carmen De La Rosa	28,031	
Working Families	Carmen De La Rosa	7,301	
Total	Carmen De La Rosa (incumbent)	35,332	86.8
Republican	Louisa Flores	4,194	10.3
Unity	Francesca Castellanos	1,052	2.6
Write-in		116	0.3
Total votes		40,694	100.0
Democratic hold			

=== 2023 (redistricting) ===
Due to redistricting and the 2020 changes to the New York City Charter, councilmembers elected during the 2021 and 2023 City Council elections will serve two-year terms, with full four-year terms resuming after the 2025 New York City Council elections.

2023 New York City Council election, District 10
Primary election
Party	Candidate	Votes	%
Democratic	Carmen De La Rosa (incumbent)	5,143	84.5
Democratic	Guillermo Perez	781	12.8
Write-in		162	2.7
Total votes		6,086	100.0
General election
Democratic	Carmen De La Rosa	7,161	
Working Families	Carmen De La Rosa	1,814	
Total	Carmen De La Rosa (incumbent)	8,975	96.5
Write-in		327	3.5
Total votes		9,302	100.0
Democratic hold			

=== 2021 ===
In 2019, voters in New York City approved Ballot Question 1, which implemented ranked-choice voting in all local elections. Under the new system, voters have the option to rank up to five candidates for every local office. Voters whose first-choice candidates fare poorly will have their votes redistributed to other candidates in their ranking until one candidate surpasses the 50 percent threshold. If one candidate surpasses 50 percent in first-choice votes, then ranked-choice tabulations will not occur.

2021 New York City Council election, District 10 Democratic primary
Party	Candidate	Maximum round	Maximum votes	Share in maximum round	Maximum votes First round votes Transfer votes
Democratic	Carmen De La Rosa	4	10,318	59.8%	
Democratic	Johanna Garcia	4	6,949	40.2%	
Democratic	Angela Fernández	3	3,997	21.7%	
Democratic	James Behr	2	729	3.7%	
Democratic	Francesca Castellanos	2	663	3.4%	
Democratic	Thomas Leon	2	600	3.1%	
Democratic	Josue Perez	2	590	3.0%	
Democratic	Tirso Piña	2	331	1.7%	
Write-in		1	60	0.3%	

2021 New York City Council election, District 10 general election
Party	Candidate	Votes	%
Democratic	Carmen De La Rosa	17,765	85.9
Republican	Edwin De La Cruz	2,702	13.1
Write-in		203	1.0
Total votes		20,670	100
Democratic hold			

=== 2017 ===
An interactive map of District 10

2017 New York City Council election, District 10
Primary election
Party	Candidate	Votes	%
Democratic	Ydanis Rodríguez (incumbent)	7,474	61.5
Democratic	Josue Perez	3,740	30.8
Democratic	Francesca Castellanos	885	7.3
Write-in		60	0.5
Total votes		12,158	100
General election
Democratic	Ydanis Rodríguez	16,988	
Working Families	Ydanis Rodríguez	1,867	
Total	Ydanis Rodríguez (incumbent)	18,855	87.7
Republican	Ronny Goodman	2,178	10.1
Write-in	Josue Perez	266	1.2
Write-in		201	1.0
Total votes		21,500	100
Democratic hold			

=== 2013 ===
2013 New York City Council election, District 10
Primary election
Party	Candidate	Votes	%
Democratic	Ydanis Rodríguez (incumbent)	10,157	70.8
Democratic	Cheryl Pahaham	3,219	22.4
Democratic	Francesca Castellanos Rodriguez	967	6.7
Write-in		1	0.0
Total votes		14,344	100
General election
Democratic	Ydanis Rodríguez	17,326	
Working Families	Ydanis Rodríguez	1,154	
Total	Ydanis Rodríguez (incumbent)	18,480	89.6
Republican	Ronnie Cabrera	1,595	7.7
School Choice	Miguel Estrella	497	2.4
Write-in		43	0.2
Total votes		20,615	100
Democratic hold			
